= Aksumite–Persian wars =

Armed conflict of the 6th century CE

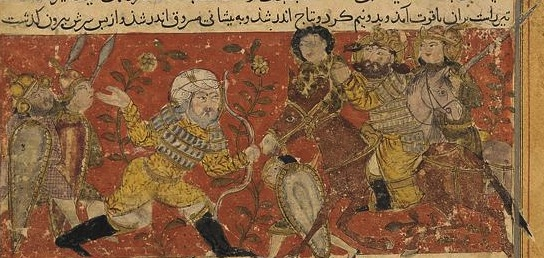
- Depiction of the deylamite general Wahrez killing the Aksumite king Masruq ibn Abraha with an arrow, from Tarikhnama
| Date | 570–578 AD |
| Location | South Arabia |
| Result | Sasanian victory |
| Territorial changes | Establishment of Sasanian Yemen |

Belligerents
| Sasanian Empire; Himyarites | Kingdom of Aksum |

Commanders and leaders
| Khosrow I Wahrez; Saif ibn Dhi Yazan †; Nawzadh † | Masruq ibn Abraha † |

Units involved
| 16,000 infantry (modern estimate); 800 cavalry (according to al-Tabari) | 44,000 troops |

The Aksumite–Persian wars were a series of pre-Islamic battles that took place in the 6th century, when the Kingdom of Aksum and the Sasanian Empire fought for control over South Arabia. Between 570 and 580 AD, two Persian invasions secured control over South Arabia, giving rise to the province of Sasanian Yemen. This period also gave rise to a group with a distinct ethnic and cultural identity known as the Al-Abna', the children of the Persian soldiers who intermarried among local Arabs. South Arabia remained under Persian rule from the Aksumite–Persian wars until the early Muslim conquests.

Descriptions of the conquest depend on largely legendary Arabic traditions, as it largely undescribed in contemporary sources, absent from Sasanian documents and only noted in passing by Byzantine sources. One of the major sources for the Aksumite-Persian wars is the History of the Prophets and Kings by Al-Tabari. According to this source, in the 520s, the Kingdom of Aksum in Ethiopia would invade and conquer South Arabia in response to the persecution of the Christian community of Najran. This brought about an end to the rule of the long-reigning Himyarite Kingdom and the deposition of its then-leader, Dhu Nuwas. By 570, the subjugated Himyarite king Sayf ibn Dhi Yazan sought to end Aksum's hegemony in the region and, after being rejected by the Byzantine Empire, turned to the Persians for military aid. The Persian king Khosrow I agreed upon the stipulation that Himyarite territory would be annexed by the Sasanian Empire in the event of an Aksumite defeat. Subsequently, the Persian army entered South Arabia and secured decisive victories in the Battle of Hadhramaut and then in the Siege of Sanaa, following which the Aksumites were largely expelled from the Arabian Peninsula, excluding Najran. With the establishment of Sasanian Yemen, Yazan was appointed to govern the region. However, four years after, he was murdered by his Aksumite servants. Facing an Aksumite reconquest, the Sasanian Empire mounted a second invasion and re-conquered Yemen by 578, indefinitely ending Aksumite rule outside of Africa. The Persian army general Wahrez was appointed as Yemen's governor, ensuring the suppression of regional pro-Byzantine influence amidst the Byzantine–Sasanian War of 572–591.

== Background ==
Around 520, the Jewish ruler of Yemen, Dhu Nuwas, initiated a persecution of the Christian community in Najran. This led to a foreign intervention by the Christian ruler of the Kingdom of Aksum, Kaleb, known as the Aksumite invasion of Himyar. His intervention succeeded, leading to Aksumite rule over South Arabia. Sumūyafa Ashwa was appointed as the viceroy over the region, but in 525, he was deposed by the Aksumite general Abraha who declared himself as the king of the new Himyarite–Aksumite Kingdom.

== History ==
=== Contemporary accounts ===
The conquest of South Arabia by Persia is absent from Persian sources. One Byzantine source notes the event in passing: according to Theophanes of Byzantium, Khosrow I marched against the Ethiopians and "with the aid of Miranos, the Persian general, he captured Sanatources, king of the Ḥimyarites, sacked their city and enslaved the inhabitants." Prior to the invasion, the Byzantine and Sasanian empires had long been in competition over who would be able to exert their control over the region.

=== Arabic sources ===
There are six major accounts in Arabic sources that describe the Persian invasions: one by Ibn Ishaq (d. 767 AD/150 AH) recorded by Ibn Hisham (d. 833/218) and Al-Tabari (d. 923/310), an account by Ibn al-Daya (d. 951/340), another version ascribed by Al-Tabari to Hisham ibn al-Kalbi (d. 819/204), Al-Dinawari (d. 895), and one by Ibn Qutaybah (d. 889/276). The accounts differ on a number of major and minor details.

=== Al-Tabari's account ===
According to Ibn Ishaq as recorded by Al-Tabari, Abraha was succeeded by his son Masruq ibn Abraha. During this time, Ma'adi Yakrib sought out foreign aid in ending Aksumite rule over South Arabia. After lack of success appealing to either the Byzantine emperor or the Al-Hiran king, the Sasanian emperor Khosrow I agreed to his request and sent an army.

==== First Persian invasion ====
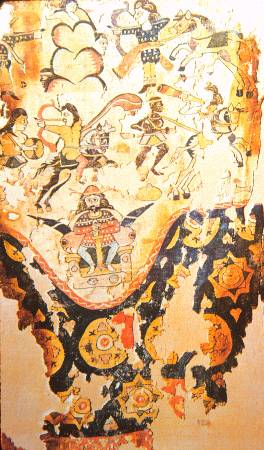
Fresco of the Sasanian emperor Khosrow I's war against the Aksumite king Masruq ibn Abraha in Yemen

In response to Maʽd-Karib's request, Khosrow I sent the Sasanian military general Wahrez and his son Nawzadh to Aksumite-ruled Yemen at the head of a small expeditionary force of 800 Dailamite cavalrymen in 570 CE. The Sasanian military, onboard eight ships, sailed around the coasts of the Arabian Peninsula; although two of the ships were wrecked, the rest successfully docked in the Hadhramaut region of southern Arabia. The strength of the Sasanian expeditionary force is variously given as 3,600 or 7,500 (Ibn Qutaybah), or 800 (al-Tabari). Modern estimates place the Sasanian force's numbers at 16,000 men. The Persians sailed from the port of Obolla, seized the Bahrain Islands, and subsequently moved on Sohar, the portside capital of historical Oman; they then captured Dhofar and the remainder of Hadhramaut before landing at Aden.

During the initial invasion, Nawzadh was killed by Aksumite forces. This event led Wahrez to pursue a vendetta against the Ethiopian ruler of Yemen, Masruq ibn Abraha, who was personally executed by Wahrez at the Battle of Hadhramaut. The decisive Persian victory at Hadhramaut marked the beginning of the Aksumite retreat and the subsequent besieging of Sanaʽa by the Persians.

Following the capture of Sanaʽa by Sasanian forces, Wahrez reinstated the former Himyarite king Sayf ibn Dhī Yazan to his throne as a vassal of the Sasanian Persian Empire. Al-Tabari reports that the defining factor of the Persian victory over the Aksumites was the panjagan, a military technology used by the Sasanian military with which the locals were unfamiliar. After the conquest of Yemen and subsequent expulsion of the Ethiopian presence there, Wahrez returned to Persia with a large amount of booty.

==== Second Persian invasion ====
By 575–578 AD, the Himyarite vassal king Yazan was murdered by his Ethiopian servants, following which the Aksumites returned and re-established their power in the region. In response, the Sasanian military invaded Yemen a second time, headed by a force of 4000 men and led by Wahrez. Yemen was then annexed by the Sasanian Empire as a province, and Wahrez was installed as its direct governor by the Sasanian emperor Khosrow I. Greater Yemen remained under Sasanian control until the Early Muslim conquests.

=== Comparison of Arabic sources ===
The account of Ibn Ishaq was recorded by Ibn Hisham and Al-Tabari. Both focus on Sayf ibn Dhi Yazan, a semi-legendary king who sought the aid of the Persians in expelling the Aksumites. In Ibn Hisham's recording of Ibn Ishaq's account, Sayf wishes to expel the Aksumites and seeks foreign help in doing so. First, he asks for help from the Byzantine emperor, but without success. Then, he asks the same of the king of Al-Hira (wrongly identified in this account as Al-Nu'man III ibn al-Mundhir). The king tells him that he may join him in his upcoming trip to and audience with Khosrow I, the Persian emperor. Ibn Ishaq now offers a detailed, but folkloric account of the custom and scenery of how the royal court was like. When Sayf meets Khosrow I, he asks him for help against Aksum. Khosrow I declines, saying that he cannot endanger his army in such an expedition. He gives Sayf 10,000 dirhams (although the Persian currency was drahms at the time) and a fine robe. However, Sayf scatters the money. Khosrow interrogates him over this and, in doing so, learns of massive gold and silver deposits in South Arabia. This convinces him to send an army of 800 prisoners under the commander Wahriz, who defeats the Aksumites led by Masruq ibn Abraha. The Al-Tabari version of the account of Ibn Ishaq has some minor discrepancies with preceding account according to Ibn Hisham, primarily regarding the circumstances of the death of the son of Wahriz in battle, and what happened during Wahriz's return to Persia after victory. Unlike Ibn Hisham, Al-Tabari has an extended account of what happened after the victory: Sayf begins to massacre the Aksumites after Wahriz leaves. This leads to a rebellion that ends up killing Sayf and re-establishing previous rule over the region. Wahriz is forced to return and re-conquer the region. This time, he stays and maintains rule over the region as a viceroy to ensure stability.

In the account of Ibn al-Daya, Wahriz plays no role and Sayf is solely responsible for victory against the Aksumites after convincing Khosrow I to aid him. In addition, Ibn al-Daya includes a story where the Aksumites attempt to subvert the message sent by Sayf to Khosrow. The account of Ibn al-Kalbi, also recorded by Al-Tabari, differs substantially from the account of Ibn Ishaq. The hero of this account is not Sayf, but a different member of the Dhu Yazan family: Abū Murra al-Fayyāḍ Dhū Yazan. In addition, Abu Murra's wife was said to have been abducted by Abraha, adding a personal grudge to the story. In Ibn al-Kalbi, Abu Murra visits the Al-Hiran king first (this time recorded as Amr ibn Hind), and then the Byzantine emperor. Instead of staying at the Byzantine court for several years, he stays at the Persian court until his death. Back in South Arabia, Abu Murra's son Ma'adi Yakrib is being raised under the impression that he is the son of Abraha and brother of Masruq. However, he learns that this is not true. After Abraha's death, he first seeks help from the Byzantines, and then finds it with the Persians. Similar to Ibn Ishaq, Wahriz plays the major role in leading an army of prisoners to defeat Masruq, and the black soldiers are massacred afterwards. In the account of Al-Dinawari, Sayf is again responsible for recruiting help, but plays a much more minor role. He is rejected by both Byzantines and Al-Hirans (though for new reasons), and this time, when he seeks Persian help, Khosrow agrees immediately. The rest of the story is described briefly and continues until the death and burial of Wahriz. Ibn Qutayba's account survives in two different sources, which are both different from one another. In the first, Sayf is not mentioned and the Persian expedition is the idea of Khosrow. The second resembles other Arab versions of the story, but also suggests a much larger contingent of troops (7500) sent by Khosrow.

Additional minor accounts of the invasions are known with other discrepancies. Of the six major accounts, two of the major points of discrepancy concern the role played by Sayf in bringing about the Persian conquest, and Sayf's religious identity: Sayf is variously described as an idolater, a Jew, or a Jew with proto-Muslim leanings. Problematically, the rulers of South Arabia at the time are known to have been Christians from the archaeological record. The question of the importance played by Sayf largely differs between sources with Persian versus Arab leanings: in those with Persian leanings, Sayf is less important in bringing about the conquests, whereas in those with Arab leanings, he is much more important and the role of the Persians (including Wahriz) is downplayed.

People from Barbaria are said to have fought alongside the Axumites, as recorded by various Arab historians. Historian Ibn Hishām preserves a verse attributed to ʿAdī ibn Zayd al-Ḥimyarī, which describes the end of Aksumite rule in Yemen and includes a reference to Barbar alongside Yaksūm (Aksum). In his Sīra, Ibn Hishām transmits a poem attributed to ʿAdī ibn Zayd describing the fall of the Aksumite kingdom following the Persian invasion. The poem includes the line: “On the day they call upon Āl Barbar and al-Yaksūm (Aksum), none of its fugitives shall escape.”

== See also ==
- Al-Abnaʽ
- Battle of Dhi Qar
- Pre-Islamic Arabia

== Sources ==
- Bosworth, C. E. (1983). "Abnāʾ". Encyclopaedia Iranica, Vol. I, Fasc. 3. pp. 226–228.
- Bowersock, Glen W. (2013). The Throne of Adulis: Red Sea Wars on the Eve of Islam. Oxford University Press. ISBN 978-0-19-973932-5.
- Potts, Daniel T. (2012). "Arabia, ii. The Sasanians and Arabia". Encyclopaedia Iranica.
- Shoshan, Boaz (2021). "The Sasanian Conquest of Ḥimyar Reconsidered: In Search of a Local Hero". In Mortensen, Mette Bjerregaard; Dye, Guillaume; Oliver, Isaac W.; Tesei, Tommaso (eds.). The Study of Islamic Origins: New Perspectives and Contexts. De Gruyter. pp. 259–274.
- Zakeri, Mohsen (1995). Sāsānid Soldiers in Early Muslim Society: The Origins of ʿAyyārān and Futuwwa. Wiesbaden: Otto Harrassowitz. ISBN 978-3-447-03652-8.
