= Battle of Hadhramaut =

6th-century battle between the Aksumites and the Sassanid Persians in Arabia

- Part of the Abyssinian–Persian wars
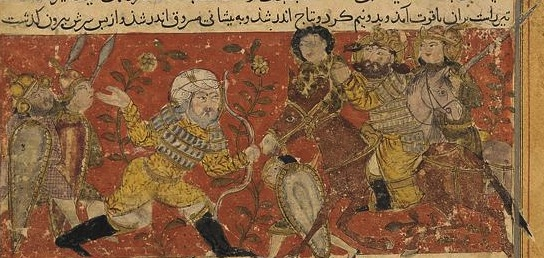
- "The arrow of old Wahraz kills Masruq, the Ethiopian King of Yemen", Persian miniature from Tarikh-i Bal'ami
Date	570
Location	Hadhramaut, Kingdom of Aksum
Result	Sasanian victory

Belligerents
Sasanian Empire	Kingdom of Aksum

Commanders and leaders
Wahrez	Masruq ibn Abraha †

Strength
16,000 men (modern estimates) 800 cavalry men (al-Tabari)	6,000–10,000 men

The Battle of Hadhramaut took place in 570 between the armies of the Sasanian Empire under the command of Spahbed Vahrez and Aksumite forces under King Masruq ibn Abraha, during the Aksumite–Persian wars. The Aksumite army was defeated by the Sasanian's forces and Masruq was killed.

The Abyssinian occupation of Yemen lasted until about 570, when a Yemeni national reaction was provoked against Masruq ibn Abraha. The leader of this patriotic movement was a scion of the Himyarite royal line, Sayf ibn Dhi-Yazan. He first tried vainly to get help from the Byzantines and Lakhmids, but then began direct negotiations with the Sasanian king Khosrau I. The king was reluctant to intervene in a region so distant from Persia, but in the end agreed to send a force of eight hundred cavalrymen of Dailamite origin, in one version men of good birth who had been consigned to prison but were now given a chance to redeem themselves by achieving victory. The force sailed around the coasts of the Arabian Peninsula; and, although two of the eight ships were wrecked, the rest landed in Hadramaut. Under their leader Vahrez, they defeated and killed Masruq and marched into the Yemeni capital of Sanaa.

== See also ==
- Panjagan
