= Abraha =

6th-century Ethiopian Aksumite military general

- King of Himyar
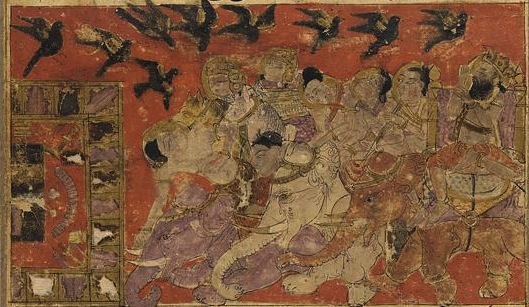
- 14th-century Persian illustration of Abraha on his attempted destruction of the Kaaba, taken from a "Tarikhnama" (history book).
- Tenure: 535–560/570
- Predecessor: Sumyafa Ashwa
- Successor: Yaksum ibn Abraha
- Born: Unknown
- Died: c. 570
- Issue: Yaksum, Masruq
- Religion: Christianity (possibly Syriac?)

Abraha (Ge’ez: አብርሃ) (also spelled Abreha, died after 570 CE), also known as Abraha al-Ashram or Abraha al-Habashi was an Aksumite viceroy of Himyar (modern-day Yemen) in the 6th century. He participated in the Aksumite invasion of Himyar between 525 CE and 530 CE, then seized the Himyarite throne by overthrowing King Sumyafa Ashwa, crowning himself ruler of the Kingdom of Himyar' and its dependencies. He titled himself with the very long royal titles carried by Himyarite kings since the 5th century CE—namely, the title "King of Saba', Dhu Raydan, Hadhramaut, Yamnat, and their Arabs on the coast and the highlands." However, Abraha distinguished himself from previous Himyarite rulers by also styling himself "The Agazian King" (Malikan Ag'azin).

It appears that Abraha faced widespread opposition to his rule in southern Arabia, particularly from the major tribe "Saba'," which was supported by the tribes of Marib, Dhu Yazan, Kinda, and the Bedouin, but he successfully suppressed all of those tribes. After Abraha reasserted his authority in southern Arabia around 548 CE, he repaired much of the infrastructure in Marib, normalized relations with major powers, and engaged important tribes of the time. During the 550s CE, Abraha set out to establish a Himyaritic empire that, during his reign, expanded to include most of the Arabian Peninsula; ultimately, his empire did not last long. Abraha’s two sons, who succeeded him on the throne, lacked their father's ambitious qualities, and no inscriptions for either ruler have been discovered yet.

He is famous for the tradition of his failed siege of Mecca, an event that is referred to as the Year of the Elephant in Islamic tradition, using an army that included war elephants. This event is interpreted by some to be the historical context behind Surah Al-Fil, the 105th surah of the Quran. A newly discovered Himyarite inscription may mention elephants, offering potential support for this battle having taken place. Abraha's campaign of the Elephant became a watershed event used by the people of Mecca as a starting point for dating years and recording events. This incident also contributed to exalting the status of the Holy Kaaba in Mecca, enhancing its religious and symbolic position across the Arabian Peninsula, and elevating the standing of Quraysh among other tribes as the guardians of the House.

== Life ==
The Byzantine historian Procopius identified Abraha as the former slave of a Roman merchant who conducted business in Adulis, while the Muslim historian al-Tabari says that he was related to the Aksumite royal family. Later, Abraha was either one of the commanders or a member of one of the armies led by King Kaleb of Axum against Dhu Nuwas. In al-Tabari's history, Abraha is said to have been the commander of the second army sent by Kaleb of Axum after the first, led by 'Ariat, failed.

Abraha was reported to have led his army of 100,000 men to successfully crush all resistance by the Yemeni army and then, following the suicide of Dhu Nuwas, seized power and established himself at Sanaa. However, he aroused the wrath of Kaleb by withholding tribute. In response, Kaleb sent his general 'Ariat to take over the governorship of Yemen. One version of what then happened was that Abraha fought a duel with 'Ariat which resulted in 'Ariat being killed and Abraha suffering the injury which earned him the sobriquet al-Ashram "Scarface." It was also said that Abraha's nose had either been lost in battle or had been severely damaged due to a disease.

According to Procopius, Abraha seized control of Yemen from Sumyafa Ashwa, the Christian viceroy appointed by Kaleb, with the support of dissident elements within the Aksumite soldiers who were eager to settle in South Arabia, then a rich and fertile land. An army sent by Kaleb to subdue Abraha decided instead to join his ranks and killed the commander (perhaps a reference to 'Ariat), and a second army was defeated. After this, Kaleb had to accord Abraha de facto recognition; he earned a more formal recognition under Kaleb's successor in return for nominal tribute. Stuart Munro-Hay, who proposes a 518 date for the rise of Dhu Nuwas, dates this event to 525, while by the chronology based on Dhu Nuwas coming to power in 523, this event would have happened about 530, although a date as late as 543 has been postulated by Jacques Ryckmans.

The reign of Abraha is documented in several inscriptions. The most detailed is dated to 548 CE and commemorates the suppression of a rebellion by the governor of Kinda, Yazid, and Sabaean as well as Himyarite princes. It also recorded the restoration of the Marib Dam, and the hosting of an international conference in which delegations from the Kingdom of Aksum, the Sasanian Empire, the Byzantine Empire, the Lakhmid Kingdom, and the Ghassanids came to Marib. The reason for this conference is not known.

The second inscription of Abraha, dated 552, mentions military campaigns in central Arabia. Two columns of Arab auxiliaries tasked with suppressing a rebellion by Banu Amir, while Abraha himself went to Haliban, approximately 300 km southwest of Riyadh. The Ma‘add tribe was defeated, and they pledged allegiance and handed over hostages. While, Nasrid ‘Amr, son of al-Mundhir, offered his own son, who had previously served as the governor of Ma‘add. The inscriptions reads as:

With Rahmanan's might and that of His Messiah, King Abraha Zybmn, king of Saba’, of dhu-Raydan, of Hadramawt, and of Yamnat, and of their Arabs in the Upper-Country and on the Coast, inscribed this text when he raided Ma‘add for the fourth time, in the month of dha-thabatan [April], when all the Banu Amir had revolted; the king sent Abu Jabr with Kinda and ‘Ali, and Bishr son of Hisn with Sa‘d and Murad; the two chiefs of the army began to battle against the Banu Amir, Kinda, and Ali in the valley of dhu Murakh, and Murad and Sa'd in a valley at the water hole of Turaban, and they slew, took prisoners, and seized booty in abundance; the king held an assembly at Haliban and they pledged allegiance, the rebels of Ma‘add who surrendered hostages; following this, Amr, son of Mundhir submitted to [Abraha], he gave his son as a hostage while he Amr had been set up as governor over Ma‘add [Abraha] returned from Haliban with Rahmanan's might, in the month of dhu-‘allan [September] six hundred and sixty-two.

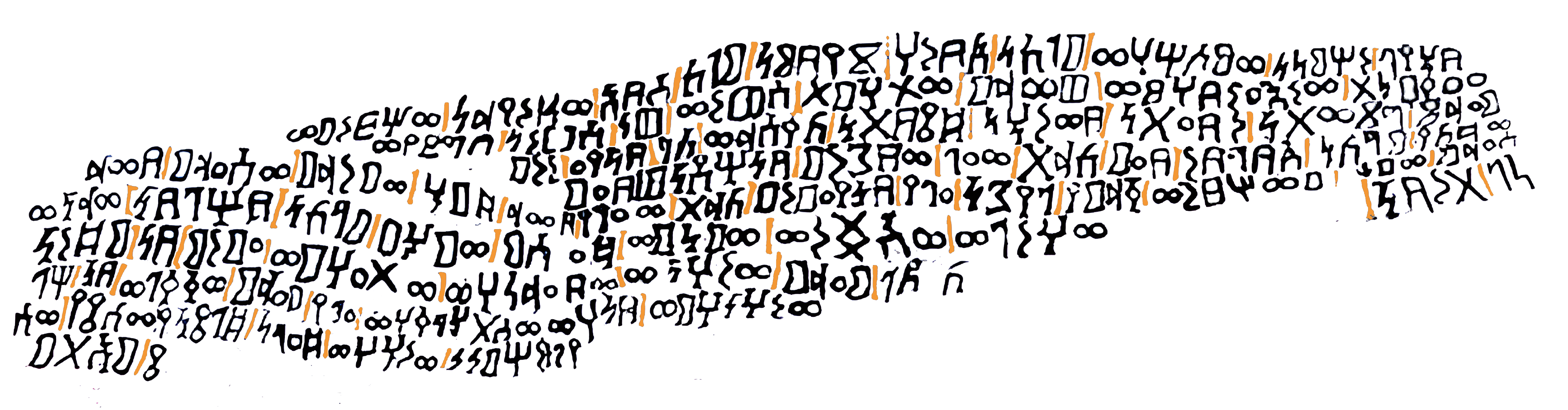
Transcription of the letters of the Murayghan inscription (inscription of Abraha) Ry 506

Abraha's last notable inscription celebrates the consolidation of power over a large portion of the Arabian Peninsula and enumerates the various regions and tribes that submitted to him. This inscription, known as Murayghān 3, is believed to have been created after the previous inscription (Ry 506). Two significant facts are stated in this inscription. Firstly, it indicates that Abraha had lost control of the great tribal confederation of Ma'add. Abraha commends himself for successfully reconquering Ma'add. Secondly, it highlights the conquest of a substantial portion of the Arabian Peninsula. The inscription reads as:

The king Abraha ZYBMN, King of Saba' and Dhū-Raydān and Hadramōt and Yamanāt and their Arabs of the Upper Country and on the coast, wrote this inscription when he returned from the land of Ma'add, when he seized the Arabs of Ma'add from Mundhir and drove out 'Amr, son of Mundhir, and he seized all the Arabs of Ma'add and Hagar and Khatt and Tayy and Yathrib and Guzām.

The different locations have all been positively identified, except for "Guzam," which Christian Robin believes is a reference to the Judham tribe.

In addition to the inscriptions, Abraha's military achievements and his influence over the Arabian Peninsula are also reflected in authentic poetry from the period. The 8th Century poet Musayyib bin al-Rîfl, a descendant of Zuhayr ibn Janab of the tribe of Banū Kalb, composed verses that testify to the enduring reverence held for Abraha long after his rule. According to French scholar Christian Robin, this poetry is remarkable because it reveals that Abraha continued to enjoy great respect in some circles more than a century after the advent of Islam. In a fragment of five verses, Musayyib explicitly boasts that his ancestor Zuhayr was entrusted by Abraha with the governance of the tribes of Bakr and Taghlib.

The other inscriptions from Abraha's reign discuss the last repairs to the Marib Dam, and potentially the building of the famous Al-Qalis Church, although this is uncertain and may have been construction work at Ghumdan palace. It is dated to 559/560, making it the last known dated Himyarite text.

The final known inscription that mentions Abraha was discovered in 2018 at the rock art site of Himā, approximately 100 kilometers north-northeast of Najrān, by the Franco-Saudi Najran archaeological mission. Designated D IDHBAH JFR01.29, the text is written in a transitional form of the South Arabian script and reads: "May Abraha Zbymn reign". Due to its irregular execution—including reversed letters and amateur carving techniques—researchers believe it was likely a slogan that was shouted during the king's passage, later engraved by an enthusiastic admirer rather than Abraha himself.

Hisham ibn al-Kalbi mentions one of the Quraysh, al-Ḥarith ibn Alqama, who was a hostage of the Quraysh was handed over to Abraha the Abyssinian. The Quraysh surrendered him to Abraha, who agreed in return not to sever the commercial relations between his kingdom and Mecca. The need for the surrender of hostages arose after some merchants from Abraha's country had been robbed in Mecca. Another hostage with Abraha, ʿUtbān bin Mālik of the Thaqif tribe, was from Taif, east-southeast of Mecca. Al-Kalbi also provides some details about Abraha's offspring. Rayhana, "daughter of al-Ashram al-Ḥabashī [the Abyssinian]," is said to have given birth to Abraha ibn al-Ṣabbāḥ, "king of Tihamah [along the Red Sea coast]". His brother was Khayr ibn al-Ṣabbāḥ. Another daughter of Abraha, sister of Masruq, was Basbāsa.

== Year of the Elephant ==
=== Islamic view ===
Abraha is best known in Islamic accounts for his infamous attempt to attack the Kaaba in Mecca. He aimed to replace the Kaaba by constructing a grand church named the Al-Qalis (from the Greek Ekklesia) in Sanaa. He also built a church in Najran for Bani Al-Harith, the House of Al-Lat in Taif for the tribe of Banu Thaqif, the House of Yareem and the House of Ghamdan in Yemen. To counter the decline of Mecca as a pilgrimage center, the people of North Arabian tribes, specifically the Kināna and the nasaʾa (those responsible for intercalation) were offended, and one man of Kinana went to Yemen, entered the church, and defecated in it. In response to this act, Abraha resolved to launch an assault on Mecca with the aid of an elephant, with the intention of destroying the Kaaba. The elephant was supposedly provided by the Axumite king. Abraha's army is said to have included forces from South Arabian tribes, including the 'Akk, al-Ashʿar, and Khath'am. On his way north, Abraha is said to have passed through the settlements of various Arab tribes from which he took prisoners who were forced to act as his guides. Abraha's army is reported to have eventually crossed through Taif, where the Banu Thaqif provided a guide named Abū Righāl to accompany him. As they approached al-Mughammas, a short distance from Mecca, Abū Righāl died and was laid to rest there and his grave would later be stoned by the Arabs (who were mostly pagans at the time) after the failure of Abraha's expedition.

Abraha sent an expedition to subjugate the Azd tribes to his army and also to open the road to Mecca, but Abraha's army was defeated by an Azdi leader named Abd Shams Ibn Masruh, so Abraha was forced to take another route to Mecca. The memory of the Mecca campaign is encapsulated in "The Year of the Elephant," typically dated to 570 CE, which serves as the starting point for Mecca's pre-Islamic history chronology. Scholars Ibrahim Zein and Ahmad el-Wakil state that the week of the attack according to the Muslim commentaries began Sunday, 14 February 572 (13 Muḥarram 51 Before Hijrah) and the birth of the holy prophet and his progeny was on Monday, 11 April 572 (12 Rabī‘ al-Awwal 51 BH).

The earliest Islamic reference to Abraha's attack on Mecca is found in the Al-Fil (Quran 105), which describes a divine intervention against the "People of the Elephant". God was said to have thwarted their wicked scheme, sending flocks of birds to rain down stones upon them, reducing them to "straw eaten up". Muslim scholars concur that the "People of the Elephant" were Abraha's troops who assaulted the Kaaba. Abraha had a troop of about 13 war elephants in the expeditionary forces. Abd al-Muttalib, put the battle in God's hands, realising that he could not take on the forces of Abraha. As Abraha's forces approached the city, the story goes:

The next day, as they prepared for battle, they discovered that their elephant (called Mahmud) refused to approach Mecca. Even worse, birds came from the sea, each of which brought three small stones, which they dropped on the soldiers of Abraha. Everyone hit by these stones was killed. Abraha was hit repeatedly and slowly dismembered. By the time he reached Sanaa, he was nothing but a miserable stump of a body. His heart burst from his chest, and he died. So the year of the War of the Elephant was a year of death. But it was also a year of life, for in that same year Prophet Muhammad Peace be upon him and his progeny was born.

Earlier mentions appear in pre-Islamic poetry, particularly in some qaṣīdas considered of unquestionable pre-Islamic origin, such as Abū Qays Ṣayfī bin al-Aslat's. This poet praises God for His help "on the day of the elephant of the Abyssinians" and narrates the elephant's defiance when the Abyssinians tried to force it forward with hooks and knives. God sent a wind showering pebbles from above, causing them to retreat in disarray. In the verses of another poet, an "ingenuous test" is mentioned, wherein God's armies compelled the Quraysh to withdraw with regret after pelting them and covering them with dust. Only a few of them reached their homes, and Ṭufayl al-Ghanawī's poetry mentions a place near Mecca where "the elephant disobeyed his masters".

=== Non-Islamic view ===
Outside of later Islamic tradition, there is no mention of Abraha's expedition at Mecca, including from Abraha's own inscriptions. Many historians see the story as a later Islamic tradition designed to explain the "Men of the Elephant" in Qur'an 105. However, recent findings of Himyaritic inscriptions describe an hitherto unknown expedition by Abraha, which subsequently led Iwona Gajda to identify this expedition as the failed conquest of Mecca. In addition, scholar Christian Julien Robin notes that the historicity of a failed expedition is completely plausible, given that the Quraysh, despite their small number, quickly rose to prominence in the following years, evidenced by the great fair of Quraysh, held in al-ʿUkāẓ, as well as the ḥums cultural association, which associated members of tribes of Western Arabia with the Mecca sanctuary.

Gajda accepted the dating of the expedition to 552 CE. It also observed that Mecca is not mentioned in the inscription. On the other hand, Daniel Beck claims that there are several issues with the story, and that African war elephants hadn't been used in the region for over 600 years. It is also difficult to explain how Abraha would have obtained African war elephants in Arabia. He also claims that surah al-Fil appears to be in reference to 2 Maccabees and 3 Maccabees, and not referencing any expedition on Abraha's part. However, Michael Charles published a study where he detailed how the Aksumite kingdom used elephants for war and had access to them during the 6th century when the expedition is said to have taken place. It should also be noted that while 2 Maccabees mentioned elephants as war beasts and a foiled military expedition, it did not mention any flying creatures. However, angels as protective flying creatures foiling an elephant army can be found in 3 Maccabees 5 and 6:18-21.

== Death ==
The exact date of that Abraha died is uncertain. Abraha ruled in the bracket between the 530s and 560s, but detailed inscriptions only cover the period between 547 and 559 CE. The final chronological marker of Abraha's lifetime is an inscription he commissioned in 559 CE commemorating his construction of a church in Sanaa. Christian J. Robin argues that because both Islamic and non-Islamic converge on the beginning of the collapse of the South Arabian kingdom to his sons (Yaksum and Masruq), who ruled after him, which happens in the beginnings of the 570s, it is likely that Abraha died by 570.

Between 570 and 575 a pro-Persian group in Yemen made contact with the Sassanid king through the Lakhmid princes in Al-Hirah. The Sassanids then sent troops under the command of Wahriz, who helped (the semi-legendary) Sayf ibn Dhi Yazan drive the Aksumites from Yemen and Southern Arabia. As a result, Southern Arabia and Yemen came under the control of the Sassanid Empire.

== See also ==
- Ancient history of Yemen#Kingdom of Aksum (520 – 570 CE)
- Abd al-Muttalib
- List of wars and battles in pre-Islamic Arabia

== Sources ==
- Robin, Christian Julien (2012), "Arabia and Ethiopia", in Johnson, Scott Fitzgerald (ed.), The Oxford Handbook of Late Antiquity, translated by Arietta Papaconstantinou, Oxford: Oxford University Press, pp. 247–334, ISBN 978-0-19-533693-1.
- Robin, Christian J. (2014). "The peoples beyond the Arabian frontier in late antiquity: recent epigraphic discoveries and latest advances" (PDF). Inside and Out. Interactions between Rome and the Peoples on the Arabian and Egyptian Frontiers in Late Antiquity. Peeters. pp. 33–79.
- Robin, Christian J. (2015a). "Ḥimyar, Aksūm, and Arabia Deserta in Late Antiquity. The Epigraphic Evidence". In Fisher, Greg (ed.). Arabs and Empires before Islam. Oxford University Press. pp. 127–171.
- Robin, Christian (2015b). "L'Arabie dans le Coran. Réexamen de quelques termes à la lumière des inscriptions préislamiques". academia.edu. p. 47.
- Robin, Christian Julien (2015c). Fisher, Greg (ed.). Arabs and Empires Before Islam. Oxford. ISBN 978-0-19-965452-9.
