= Sasanian reconquest of Yemen =

Persian conquest of Aksumite protectorate Yemen (575/578)

- Part of the Aksumite–Persian wars
| Date | 575 or 578 |
| Location | Yemen |
| Result | Sasanian victory: Aksum rule ceased in the Arabian peninsula; Yemeni rule as vassals of the Sasanian Empire established |

Belligerents
| Sasanian Empire | Kingdom of Aksum |

Commanders and leaders
| Wahrez | Unknown |

Strength
| 4,000 | Unknown |

The Sasanian reconquest of Yemen was a major armed conflict in pre-Islamic Arabia which took place in 575 or 578 after Aksumite men killed Sayf ibn Dhi Yazan after a reign of some four years and took control of Yemen. The rising took place when the protecting Persian garrison withdrew from Yemen. The Sasanians, this time with a force of 4,000 men, managed to reconquer Yemen and install Sayf’s son, Maʿdī Kareb as ruler.

A pre-Islamic Arabian poet, Umayya bin Abi al-Salt, has praised the victory of the Persians in one of his poems. His poem is recorded in Abu al-Faraj al-Isfahani's Kitab al-Aghani.

A Persian military force now remained in Yemen for over fifty years, with a Persian governor at Maʿdī Kareb’s side. The names of the successive Persian governors are as follows, according to Tabari (there is some variation in the sources over the names):

- Wahriz
- Marzbān (son of Wahriz)
- Bīnagār (son of Marzbān)
- Kharra Khusraw (son of Bīnagār)
- Bādhān or Bādhām, who was unconnected with Wahriz's line and replaced Kharra Khusraw due to the assimilation of the latter into the local culture.

The Persian garrison of soldiers and officials settled down in Sana'a and its vicinity and intermarried with the local Arab population, and the sons of these Persian fathers and Arab mothers, with their descendants, became known as the abnāʾ.

== Sources ==
- Bosworth, C. E. (1983). "Abnāʾ". Encyclopaedia Iranica, Vol. I, Fasc. 3. pp. 226–228.
- Potts, Daniel T. (2012). "ARABIA ii. The Sasanians and Arabia". Encyclopaedia Iranica.
- Zakeri, Mohsen (1995). Sāsānid Soldiers in Early Muslim Society: The Origins of ʿAyyārān and Futuwwa. Wiesbaden: Otto Harrassowitz. ISBN 978-3-447-03652-8.
