= Aksumite invasion of Himyar =

518–528 invasion of Himyarite Kingdom by Aksumite Empire

- Part of Roman–Persian Wars
- The Kingdom of Aksum c. 6th century after the conquest of Himyar
Date	518–525
Location	Southern Arabia
Result	Aksumite victory
Territorial changes	Himyar annexed by Aksum

Belligerents
Kingdom of Aksum; Eastern Roman Empire; Christians of Najran^{[{{{2}}}]}; Supported by: Ghassanid Kingdom; Anti-Himyarite Yemeni tribes: Khawlan; Madh'hij; Kindah	Himyar

Commanders and leaders
Kaleb of Axum; Sumyafa Ashwa; Ma'dikarib Ya'fur; Arethas of Najran; Ḥayyān	Yūsuf Dhū Nuwās ‡‡

Strength
70 Roman ships during the invasion of 525; 100,000 troops; Roman reinforcements	16,000–30,000

Casualties and losses
22,000–28,000 killed 11,000 prisoners	Unknown

The Aksumite invasion of Himyar consisted of a series of two invasions from 518 to 525 fought between the Christian Kingdom of Aksum and the Jewish Himyarite Kingdom. The wars functioned as proxy wars waged by the former on behalf of the Roman Empire during the Roman-Persian Wars with the ultimate goal of establishing an anti-Sasanian bloc in Arabia Felix.

== Background ==
During the 2nd and 3rd centuries AD, the Southern part of Arabia, known in antiquity as Arabia Felix, had experienced Aksumite political and military involvement, as the Aksumites had occupied relatively peripheral areas in the region and formed alliances with the local tribes.

During the late 4th century AD, the local population converted to Judaism, and a Jewish kingdom known as Himyar was established. During the reign of Himyarite King Yanuf Dhu Shanatir, the Aksumites established diplomatic relations with the Himyarite capital city of Ẓafār, but the friendly relations between the two kingdoms did not last long, as in the second decade of the 6th century AD, the Jewish Himyarites began to persecute the Christian community of Southern Arabia.

A severe drought in the 6th century weakened the Himyarite kingdom and contributed to its eventual conquest by Aksum.

== Aksumite invasion of 518 ==
Negus Kālēb dispatched a punitive expedition to Arabia Felix led by general Ḥayyān, for both irredentist reasons and in response to the persecution of Christians in Najran by the Himyarite King Masruq. The initial military campaign was successful and the Aksumites brought to power a Himyar Christian by the name of Maʿdīkarib Yaʿfur. However, in 522 Yūsuf Dhū Nuwās declared himself king in a successful coup d'état and began to persecute Christians once again by setting fire to churches and attacking Christian communities in Ẓafār and Tihāma. In 524, Yūsuf Dhū Nuwās besieged the Christian city of Najran and ordered his troops to slaughter the whole city for refusing to convert to Judaism, and news of the massacres rapidly spread across the region.

== Aksumite invasion of 525 ==
In response to the massacres of Christians by Dhū Nuwās, the Byzantine emperor Justin I sent a call to arms through the Patriarch of Alexandria Timothy IV, and Negus Kālēb decided to lead his armies in person into another invasion in 525. The Aksumite army was reinforced by the Roman army sent by the Byzantine emperor Justin I. Following the defeat of Yūsuf Dhū Nuwās, another Himyar Christian by the name of Sumūyafa Ashwa was crowned King of Himyar, soon after Christian churches were rebuilt and Christians who were forcibly converted to Judaism were allowed to revert to Christianity.

== Aftermath ==
In 535, a Christian Aksumite general by the name of Abrǝhā revolted against Sumūyafa Ashwa and seized power, declaring himself King of Himyar. After several unsuccessful military campaigns by Negus Kālēb to overthrow the new king, Abrǝhā remained in power in exchange for a tribute and soon after established diplomatic relations with the Aksumite Kingdom, the Byzantine Empire and the Sasanian Empire.

== See also ==
- Book of the Himyarites
