= Yaksum ibn Abraha =

6th-century King of Himyar (in Yemen)

- King of Himyar
- Reign: 535/570–571
- Predecessor: Abraha
- Successor: Masruq ibn Abraha
- Born: c. 510
- Died: c. 571; South Arabia, Kingdom of Aksum
Names
- Yaksum ibn Abraha al-Ashram
- Religion: Christianity

Yaksum ibn Abraha (Arabic: أكسوم بن أبرهة) was an Abyssinian king of Himyar, and one of the sons of Abraha. In the year 548, Abraha himself appointed Yaksum as the deputy of the land of the Dhu Ma'ahir tribe, an event which is attested to in his only archaeological inscription. Not much is known about Yaksum historically.

The historian Ubayd bin Sharia narrated that Yaksum's death occurred not long after his father had died. He was succeeded by his brother, Masruq ibn Abraha.

== See also ==
- Abraha
- Masruq ibn Abraha
