= Yemen Province =

Yemen Province may refer to:

- Sasanian Yemen, province of the Sasanian Empire (570-628)
- Yemen Eyalet, part of the Ottoman Empire (1517-1636, 1849-1872)
- Yemen Vilayet, part of the Ottoman Empire (1872-1918)
- Islamic State – Yemen Province
