= Dhu Yazan =

Arab clan

The Dhu Yazan (Arabic: ذُو يزن), also known as Al-Yazanin, were a prominent Arab tribal clan and elite ruling family of Yemen that were affiliated with the Sabaean Kingdom and later on, the Himyarite Kingdom. They were ultimately deprived from their elite status and ruling by the Sasanian Empire, which controlled Yemen from 570 CE until 678 CE. The Arabian genealogists and historians trace their lineage to a man named 'Amir ibn Aslam who was given the title Dhu Yazan and was a contemporary of the Himyarite ruler Abu Karib, although the Dhu Yazan clan has existed way back during the time of Dhamar Ali Yahbur.

== History ==
The Dhu Yazan clan aided the Sabaeans against the Kingdom of Hadhramaut in the late 3rd century. As a revenge attack, several Hadhramite rebels bombarded the city of 'Abadan, which was where the Dhu Yazan clan lived. Later in the 4th century, they formed a military force which served under the king Tharan Yuha'nim. The king's son, Malikikarib Yuha'min, married a woman from the Dhu Yazan clan. Members of the clan also raided a city at Al Mahrah in the year 515.

Dhu Yazan were prominent allies of Dhu Nuwas, helping him in his persecution of Christians in Najran and the war against the Aksumite Empire. Later, a portion of the Yazanites which included Sumyafa' Ashwa were ordered to fortify the fortress at Hisn al-Ghurab by Dhu Nuwas. After the Aksumites had invaded Himyar, Sumyafa' Ashwa and the Yazanites under him came out from hiding and made peace with the king Kaleb. The latter would hire Sumyafa' Ashwa as his viceroy and the vassal ruler of Himyar.

In 570 CE, the Yazanite prince Ma'adi Yakrib ibn Abi Murrah requested help from the Sasanian Empire to end the Aksumite rule over Yemen. The Sasanians agreed, and the Aksumite ruler Masruq ibn Abraha was defeated and then killed in battle during the Aksumite–Persian wars, afterwards Ma'adi Yakrib was made the vassal ruler of Himyar for the Sasanian Empire. But Ma'adi Yakrib was assassinated by his own servants, afterwards the Sasanian Empire sent a Persian governor to rule Yemen. The Dhu Yazan family was completely deprived from ruling.

== Religion ==
As early as the late 4th century, the Dhu Yazan family supposedly converted to Judaism.

== Notable members ==
- Sharah'il Yaqbul-Yaz'an, Himyarite military general who served Dhu Nuwas
- Sumyafa' Ashwa, Yemeni convert to Christianity and temporary king of Himyar under the Aksumite Empire
- Ma'adi Yakrib ibn Abi Murrah, Himyarite prince and later on the last king of Himyar, serving as a vassal under the Sasanian Empire

== See also ==
- Tribes of Yemen
- List of rulers of Saba' and Himyar
