= Sumyafa Ashwa =

6th-century King of Himyar (in Yemen)

- King of Himyar
- Reign: 522/530–535
- Predecessor: Dhu Nuwas
- Successor: Overthrown and deposed by Abraha
- Born: c. 460 (Yemen)
- Died: c. 535
Names
- Sumyafa' Ashwa al-Yazani
- Religion: Christianity

Sumyafa' Ashwa al-Yazani, also known as Esimiphaios (Latin: Esimiphaeus) in Syriac and Greek sources, was a vassal king of Himyar, ruling in the 6th century CE under the Aksumite Empire. He was also the viceroy of the Aksumite king Kaleb, who had invaded Himyar and defeated Dhu Nuwas. Sumyafa' Ashwa was a native convert to Christianity.

== Archaeological Inscriptions ==
There is an inscription mentioning Sumyafa' Ashwa, which commemorates the refortification of Bi'r `Ali from February 530 or 531 by a Sumyafa' Ashwa and his sons Sharhabil Yakmul and Ma'dikarib Ya'fur. He was the son of Lakhni'ah Yarkham, from western Ḥimyar and had been in exile in Aksum, only returning with the Aksumite invasion force.It is not certain that this was the same Sumyafa' Ashwa who was or became king of Himyar.

Another inscription also indicates that Sumyafa' Ashwa was from the influential elite Dhu Yazan family. Some have suggested that Sumyafa' Ashwa was the father of the Himyarite prince, Sayf ibn Dhi Yazan, whose real name is Ma'adi Yakrib ibn Abi Murrah.

== Reign ==
It is not possible to be precise about the date of accession of Sumūyafaʿ Ashwaʿ. A native Ḥimyarite and a Christian, he was appointed by the Aksumite king Caleb, who had defeated and killed the previous king of Ḥimyar, Dhū Nuwās, sometime between Pentecost 525 and February 531. A fragmentary inscription appears to give Kaleb's full title as the King of Saba', Dhu Raydan, Hadramawt, Yamnat and their Arabs, on Tawdum and Tihamat. The text records the founding of a building, most likely a church. After his victory, Caleb returned to Aksum but left part of his army behind as a garrison.

The Roman emperor Justinian I sent two embassies to Ḥimyar during the brief reign of Sumūyafaʿ Ashwaʿ. Sometime between April and September 531, he sent an embassy to the court of Aksum and to Sumyafa' Ashwa, hoping for an alliance against Persia and for Ḥimyarite aid to the Roman ally Qays ibn Salama ibn al-Ḥārith. The Roman historian Procopius details the embassy of the ambassador Julian:

At that time, when Hellesthaeus [Caleb] was reigning over the Aethiopians [Aksumites], and Esimiphaeus over the Homeritae [Ḥimyarites], the Emperor Justinian sent an ambassador, Julianus, demanding that both nations on account of their community of religion should make common cause with the Romans in the war against the Persians. . . As for the Homeritae, it was desired that they should establish Caïsus [Qays], the fugitive, as captain over the Maddeni [Maʿadd], and with a great army of their own people and of the Maddene Saracens make an invasion into the land of the Persians. This Caïsus was by birth of the captain’s rank and an exceptionally able warrior, but he had killed one of the relatives of Esimiphaeus and was a fugitive in a land which is so utterly destitute of human habitation. So each king, promising to put this demand into effect, dismissed the ambassador, but neither one of them did the things agreed upon by them.

A little later Nonnosos was sent on a mission to Kinda and Aksum, but "in addition to these goals [he was] to visit the Ameritae", that is, the Ḥimyarites. In 535, Abraha, the commander of the Aksumite forces in Ḥimyar, revolted and overthrew Sumyafa' Ashwa, who was imprisoned in a fortress. Caleb sent two further military expeditions to restore Sumūyafaʿ Ashwaʿ, but both ended in failure. The details of these events are found in Procopius. In the 540s, when Abraha had inscriptions added to the Maʾrib Dam to commemorate its repair, he noted his victory over a son of Sumyafa' Ashwa.

The Aksumite military general, Aryat, of later Islamic accounts may be partially based on Sumyafa' Ashwa. Later Christian historiography generally omitted Sumyafa' Ashwa in order not to expose Abraha—a Christian hero in these accounts—as an usurper. This often extended to falsely lengthening the reign of Abraha to include that of his predecessor. Thus, Sumyafa' Ashwa is not mentioned in the Martyrion of Arethas, the Bios of Gregentios, the Chronographia of Theophanes of Byzantium or the Chronicle of Michael the Syrian. On the basis of the Laws of the Ḥimyarites, part of the Bios of Gregentios, Irfan Shahîd argued that Sumūyafaʿ Ashwaʿ took the throne name Abraham, causing confusion between him and his successor because of the similarity of their names.

== Bibliography ==
- Bowersock, Glen W. (2013). The Throne of Adulis: Red Sea Wars on the Eve of Islam. Oxford University Press. ISBN 978-0-19-973932-5.
- Edwell, Peter; Fisher, Greg; Greatrex, Geoffrey; Whately, Conor; Wood, Philip (2015). "Arabs in the Conflict between Rome and Persia, AD 491–630". In Greg Fisher (ed.). Arabs and Empires before Islam. Oxford University Press. pp. 214–275.
- Fiaccadori, Gianfranco (2006). "Gregentios in the Land of the Homerites". In Albrecht Berger (ed.). Life and Works of Saint Gregentios, Archbishop of Taphar: Introduction, Critical Edition and Translation. De Gruyter. pp. 48–82. doi:10.1515/9783110911060.48. ISBN 9783110911060.
- Peters, Francis E. (1994). Muhammad and the Origins of Islam. State University of New York Press. ISBN 9780791418758.
- Robin, Christian Julien (2015). "Before Ḥimyar: Epigraphic Evidence for the Kingdoms of South Arabia". In Greg Fisher (ed.). Arabs and Empires before Islam. Oxford University Press. pp. 90–126.
- Shahîd, Irfan (1979). "Byzantium in South Arabia". Dumbarton Oaks Papers. 33: 23–94. doi:10.2307/1291433. JSTOR 1291433.
