= Al-Abna' =

Medieval Arab-Persian community in South Arabia

Al-Abnāʾ (Arabic: الأبناء, lit. 'the sons') is a term that was used in South Arabia to refer to people whose lineage was paternally Iranian and maternally Arab. They represented a distinct community that had come into existence following the end of the Aksumite–Persian wars in the 6th century, when Persian soldiers began intermarrying with local Arab women in Sanaa and throughout Yemen. These couples' offspring and their descendants held an ethnic and cultural identity that was influenced by their mixed heritage from the Sasanian Empire and the Himyarite Kingdom, though they eventually assimilated into the society of the latter. In the 7th century, following the rise of Muhammad as an Islamic prophet in the Hejaz, most of the al-Abnāʾ community adopted Islam and took part in the early Muslim conquests, including the Muslim conquest of Persia.

== Etymology ==
According to a commentary by the 10th-century Arab historian, Abu al-Faraj al-Isfahani in the Kitab al-Aghani, these people were, up until this time, referred to as Banū al-Aḥrār (بنو الأحرار, lit. 'sons of the free people') in Sanaa and as al-Abnāʾ in the rest of Yemen. The names were defined as such due to a narration that told of a strong storm that hit ancient Yemen and revealed a stone inscription that stated: "Who rules Dhamar? Himyar the Good. Who rules Dhamar? The evil Abyssinians. Who rules Dhamar? The free Persians." A similar stone inscription of pre-Islamic Arabia was said to have been found underneath the Kaaba in Mecca.

== History ==
=== Pre-Islamic era ===
Al-Abna were the descendants of the Sasanian forces dispatched to Yemen in the middle of the 6th century, who settled down in Yemen after conquering it and raised their own famillies.

The known history of the al-Abnāʾ people covers the time between the Aksumite–Persian wars in the 6th century and the founding of Islam in the 7th century. It is unknown whether the community's religious beliefs consisted of their ancestors' Zoroastrianism or South Arabian paganism, or whether they adopted local Christianity. According to the 9th and 10th-century Iranian scholar al-Tabari, Khurrah Khosrow, the fourth governor of Sasanian Yemen, was replaced by the governor Badhan during the reign of Khosrow II due to the former's excessive assimilation into Arab society.

=== Islamic era ===
The authority of Yemen's Sasanian governors was reduced during the Byzantine–Sasanian War of 602–628, a conflict which coincided with the emergence of Muhammad as an Islamic prophet in the Arabian Peninsula. The Sasanian leaders in Yemen, including Badhan, Fayruz al-Daylami, and Wahb ibn Munabbih, responded favorably to Muhammad's diplomatic missions and formally converted to Islam by 631. Following Badhan's death, his son Shahr replaced him as governor but was killed by the rebellious Arab tribal leader al-Aswad al-Ansi, who had claimed prophethood during the Ridda Wars. Al-Aswad was later killed by Fayruz, who assumed his position as Yemen's governor. Another rebellion by Ghayth ibn Abd Yaghuth sought to expel the al-Abnāʾ community from Arabia as a whole. Dādawayh (دادويه), a leader of the al-Abnāʾ community, was killed during this rebellion, while Fayruz and Jushnas (Gushnasp) managed to flee with their allies and later defeated Ghayth. Fayruz and the al-Abnāʾ people were later active in the Fertile Crescent and Yemen under Umar ibn al-Khattab of the Rashidun Caliphate.

The al-Abnāʾ people retained their distinct identity during the Islamic period; their nisba was al-Abnāwī (الأبناوي). They were gradually absorbed into the local population and thus disappeared from legal records. Descendants of the al-Abnāʾ people live in the village of al-Furs in Wadi Rijam, the Wadi al-Sir of Bani Hushaysh District, Khulan al-Tyal, Bayt Baws, and Bani Bahlul.

The title al-Abnāʾ may have been the root of the title Abnāʾ al-Dawla, used to refer to the influential Persians of Baghdad during the time of the Abbasid Caliphate. The "Abna" recorded in some conflicts among the Arabs of Khorasan during the time of the Umayyad Caliphate are not related to Yemen's al-Abnāʾ community.

== See also ==
- Kisra legend, a story asserting historical Arab and Persian migrations to Nigeria

== Sources ==
- Bosworth, C. E. (1983). "Abnāʾ". Encyclopaedia Iranica, Vol. I, Fasc. 3. pp. 226–228.
- Potts, Daniel T. (2012). "Arabia ii. The Sasanians and Arabia". Encyclopaedia Iranica.
- Kennedy, H. (1988). "Baghdad i. The Iranian Connection: Before the Mongol Invasion". Encyclopaedia Iranica, Vol. III, Fasc. 4. pp. 412–415.
- Zakeri, Mohsen (1995). Sāsānid Soldiers in Early Muslim Society: The Origins of ʿAyyārān and Futuwwa. Wiesbaden: Otto Harrassowitz. ISBN 978-3-447-03652-8.
- Mughalṭāy ibn Qalīj (2011). Muḥammad as-Sayyid Uṯmān (ed.). Ikmāl Taḏhīb al-Kamāl fī Asmā' al-Jalāl إكمال تهذيب الكمال في أسماء الرجال (in Arabic). Vol. 5. Dar Al Kotob Al Ilmiyah.
- al-Maqḥafī, Ibrāhīm. Mu'jam al-Baladān wa-l-Qabā'il al-Yamaniyya معجم البلدان والقبائل اليمنية [Dictionary of Yemini Cities and Tribes] (in Arabic).
