= Himyar =

Former kingdom in ancient Yemen

Himyar 𐩢𐩣𐩺𐩧 (Himyaritic) مملكة حمير (Arabic)
- 110 BCE–575/578 CE
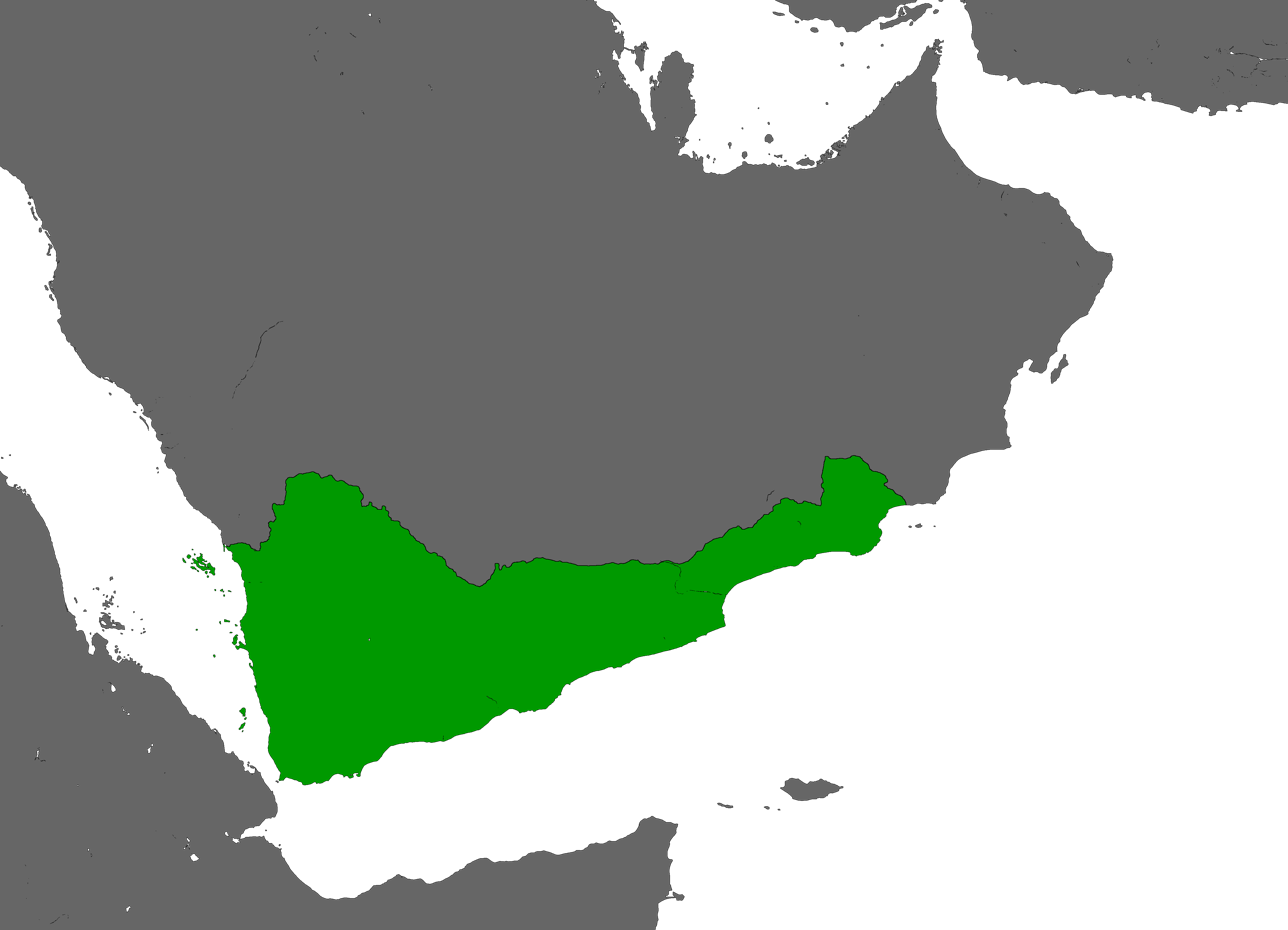
- The Himyarite Kingdom at its height in 525 AD
- Capital: Zafar; Sanaa (from the beginning of the 4th century)
- Common languages: Ḥimyarite
- Religion: South Arabian polytheism; Judaism (after 390 CE (Note: Although it may possibly have been adopted earlier.)); Christianity (after 500 CE)
- Government: Monarchy
- King
  - 275–300 CE: Shammar Yahri'sh
  - 390–420 CE: Abu Karib As'ad
  - 510s–530 CE: Yusuf Ash'ar Dhu Nuwas
  - 535–570 CE: Abraha
  - 571–575/578 CE: Saif ibn Dhi Yazan
- Historical era: Antiquity
  - Established: 110 BCE
  - Byzantine-Aksumite Invasions: 518–525/530 CE
  - Abraha's seizure of power: 535 CE
  - Year of the Elephant: 570 CE
  - Sasanian conquest and reconquest: 570–575/578 CE
  - Disestablished: 575/578 CE
- Currency: Drachma
Preceded by	Succeeded by
Saba'; Qataban	Kingdom of Aksum; Sasanian Yemen
- Today part of: Yemen; Oman; Saudi Arabia

Himyar (Note: (Arabic: حِمْيَر, romanized: Ḥimyar; Ṣayhadic: 𐩢𐩣𐩺𐩧𐩣, Ḥmyrm) or the Himyarite Kingdom (Arabic: مملكة حِمْيَر, romanized: Mamlakat Ḥimyar, Hebrew: ממלכת חִמְיָר), historically referred to as the Homerite Kingdom by Greek and Roman authors, with its inhabitants called the Homeritae)) was a South Arabian kingdom whose original heartland lay in the southern highlands of present-day Yemen. From this core, Himyar expanded at the expense of the other South Arabian kingdoms and, by the late third century CE, had established its supremacy over most of South Arabia, its rulers subsequently extended their authority into parts of the Arabian interior. Until around 110 BCE, Himyar formed part of the Qatabanian kingdom, after which it emerged as an independent kingdom. Its capital was the ancient city of Ẓafār, in the Yemeni highlands. Political power later shifted toward Sanaa, which became the principal center of the kingdom by late antiquity. Himyarite rulers were associated with dhū-Raydān, and their royal titulature initially styled them as kings of Sabaʾ and dhū-Raydān.

The kingdom conquered neighbouring Sabaʾ in c. 25 BCE for the first time, Qataban in c. 200 CE, and Ḥaḍramawt around 300 CE. Its political fortunes relative to Sabaʾ changed repeatedly until Himyar finally established control over the Sabaean Kingdom in the late third century. Following a period of political decline and conflict, the kingdom fell to an Aksumite invasion in the early sixth century. Thereafter, Himyar was ruled by an Aksumite-backed regime until Sasanian intervention brought Yemen under the influence of the Sasanian Empire in 575 or 578.

The Himyarites originally worshiped most of the South-Arabian pantheon, including Wadd, ʿAthtar, 'Amm, and Almaqah. Since at least the reign of Malkikarib Yuhamin (c. 375–400 CE), Judaism was adopted as the de facto state religion. The religion may have been adopted to some extent as much as two centuries earlier, but inscriptions to polytheistic deities ceased after this date. It was initially embraced by the upper classes and, over time, possibly by a large proportion of the general population. Native Christian kings ruled Himyar from 500 CE to 521–522 CE. Christianity itself became the main religion after the Aksumite conquest in 530 CE.

Descendants of the Himyarites, namely the aristocratic families of Dhu'l-Kala and Dhu Asbah, played a prominent role in early Islamic Syria. They led the South Arabian contingents of the Muslim army during the conquest of Homs in 638 and contributed to making Homs a center of South Arabian settlement, culture, and political power. Their chiefs supported Mu'awiya ibn Abi Sufyan against Caliph Ali in the First Muslim Civil War (656–661). Their influence waned with their defeat at the Battle of Marj Rahit against the Quda'a confederation and the Umayyad caliph Marwan I in 684 and practically diminished with the death of their leader at the Battle of Khazir in 686. Nonetheless, members of the Dhu'l-Kala and Dhu Asbah played important roles at different times through the remainder of Umayyad rule (661–750) as governors, commanders, scholars, and pietists.

== History ==
The Himyarite Kingdom was a confederation of tribes; several inscriptions and monumental buildings from this period survive and show evidence of a wealthy, sophisticated, relatively literate society with a rich variety of local gods and religions. Trade was already well established by the 3rd century AD, with Yemen supplying the Roman Empire with frankincense and myrrh. Furthermore, the late 1st century AD writer Pliny the Elder mentioned that the kingdom was one of "the richest nations in the world". It was a hub of international trade, linking the Mediterranean, the Middle East, and India.

The trade linking East Africa with the Mediterranean world largely consisted of exporting ivory from Africa to be sold in the Roman Empire. Ships from Ḥimyar regularly travelled along the East African coast, and the state also exerted significant cultural, religious, and political influence over the trading cities of East Africa, whilst the cities of East Africa remained independent. The Periplus of the Erythraean Sea describes the trading empire of Himyar and its ruler "Charibael" (probably Karab'il Watar Yuhan'em II), who is said to have been on friendly terms with Rome:

"23. And after nine days more there is Saphar, the metropolis, in which lives Charibael, lawful king of two tribes, the Homerites and those living next to them, called the Sabaites; through continual embassies and gifts, he is a friend of the Emperors."

— Periplus of the Erythraean Sea, Paragraph 23.

=== Early period ===
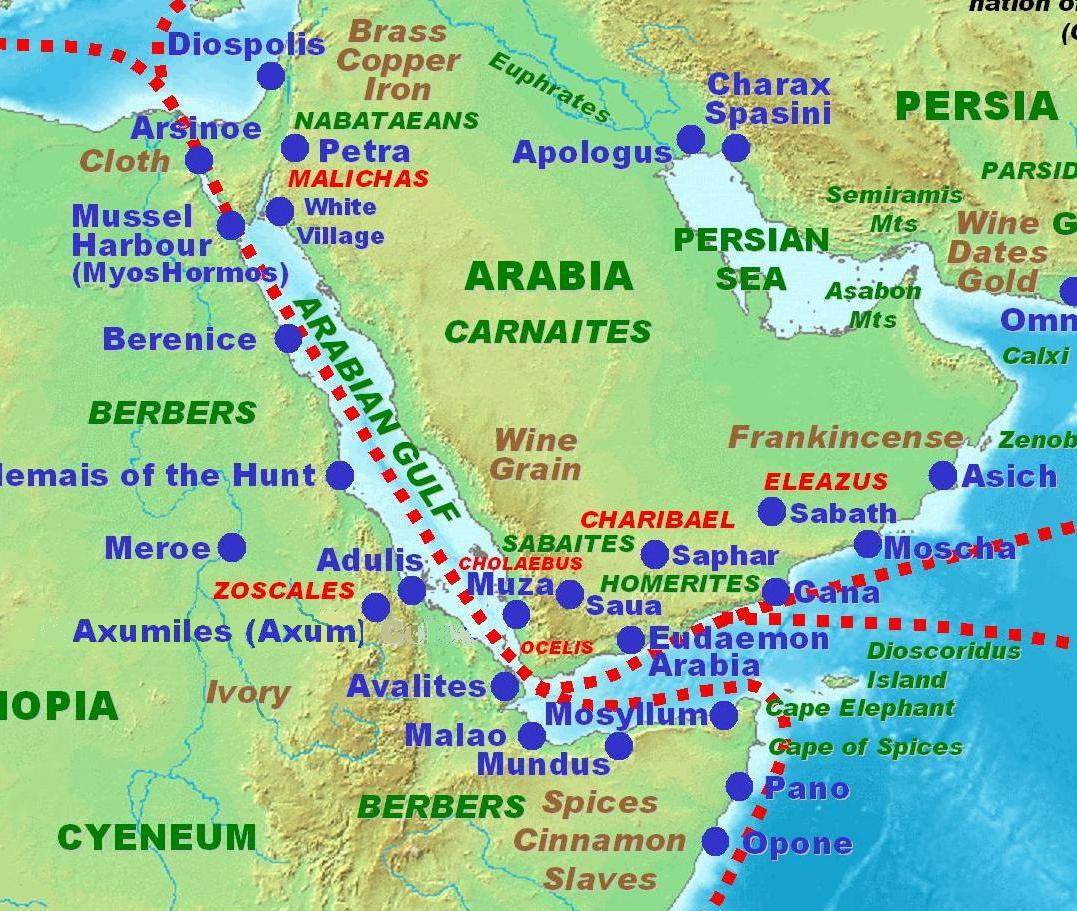
The "Homerite Kingdom" is described in the southern tip of the Arabian peninsula in the 1st century Periplus of the Erythraean Sea.

During this period, the Kingdom of Ḥimyar conquered the kingdoms of Saba' and Qataban and took Raydan/Zafar for its capital instead of Ma'rib; therefore, they have been called Dhu Raydan (ذو ريدان). In the early 2nd century AD, Saba' and Qataban split from the Kingdom of Ḥimyar; yet in a few decades, Qataban was conquered by Hadhramaut (which in turn was conquered by Ḥimyar in the 4th century), whereas Saba' was finally conquered by Ḥimyar in the late 3rd century.

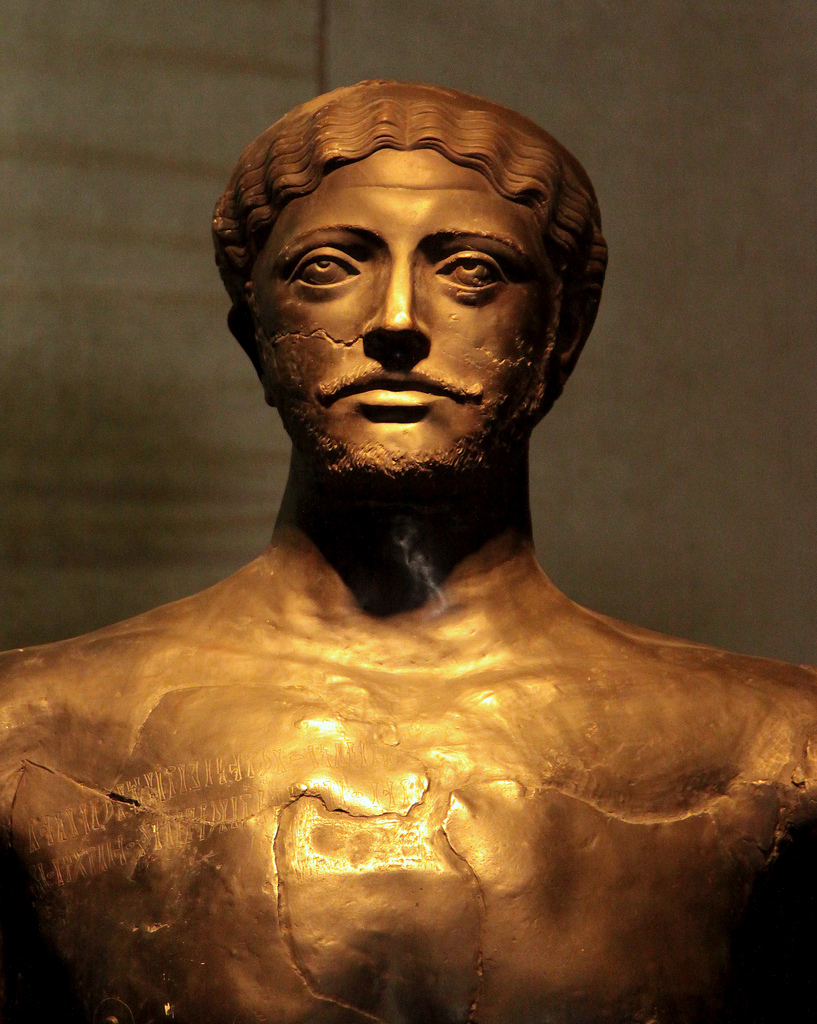
Bronze statue of Dhamarʿalīy Yuhbabirr "King of Saba, Dhu Raydan, Hadhramawt and Yamnat" (Himyarite Kingdom) 170–180 AD.

Ẓafār's ruins cover an area of over 120 hectares on Mudawwar Mountain, 10 km north-north-west of the town of Yarim. Early, Empire, and Late/Post art periods have been identified. Around the same time in the north, Himyar General named Nuh Ifriqis led an expedition to Barbaria and took control of eastern ports in modern-day Djibouti. Other Himyarite generals went as far as invading Rhapta in modern-day Mozambique.

By the 4th century, the rich Himyarite export of incense, which had once supplied pagan Rome with its religious offerings, began to wane with the Christianization of Rome, contributing to a collapse in the local economy.

=== Expansion into Central Arabia ===
Himyarite expansion into Central Arabia is attested from the mid-fourth century. Inscriptions record repeated expeditions into the Arabian interior between c. 340 and 360, including campaigns reaching Al-Kharj in Najd, within territory associated with the Maʿadd confederation. By around 440, Himyar had annexed Maʿadd and established garrisons in the region, with Kindite forces participating in the conquest. Himyar subsequently maintained extensive control over much of the Arabian interior for nearly two centuries, although Maʿadd temporarily passed under the authority of the kings of al-Hira in the early 530s.

Himyarite armies drew on forces from the sedentary communities of South Arabia as well as tribal auxiliaries, particularly from Kindah, Madhhij and Murad. In the campaigns that brought Central Arabia under Himyarite control, the Yazʾanid princes of Hadhramaut and Kindite forces played a prominent role.

=== Jewish monarchy ===
==== Conversion ====
By 300, the Himyarite Kingdom had vanquished other political units (including the Saba, Qataban, and Hadrawat kingdoms) and had become the ruling power in southern Arabia, uniting the region for the first time. In the mid- to late-fourth century, Himyar, or at least its ruling class, had adopted Judaism, having transitioned from polytheistic practices. These events are chronicled by the Book of the Himyarites and the fifth-century Ecclessiastical History of the Anomean Philostorgius. Such sources implicate the motive for conversion was a wish among the Himyarite rulers to distance themselves from the Roman Empire, which had tried to convert them to Christianity. This also occurred several decades after the Kingdom of Aksum converted to Christianity in 328. No changes occurred in the people's script, calendar, or language (unlike at Aksum after its conversion). The conversion from polytheism and the institutionalization of Judaism as the official religion is credited in these sources to Malkīkarib Yuha’min (r. c. 375–400). According to traditional Islamic sources, the conversion took place under his son, Abu Karib (r. c. 400–445). It is in the mid-fourth century that inscriptions suddenly transition from polytheistic invocations to those mentioning the high god Rahmanan, "the Lord of Heaven" or "Lord of Heaven and Earth". A Sabaic inscription dating to this time, titled Ja 856 (or Fa 60), describes the replacement of a polytheistic temple dedicated to the god Almaqah with a mikrāb (which might be the equivalent of a synagogue or an original form of organization local to Himyarite Judaism). The evidence suggests a sharp break with polytheism, coinciding with the sudden appearance of Jewish and Aramaic words (‘ālam/world, baraka/bless, haymanōt/guarantee, kanīsat/meeting hall) and personal names (Yṣḥq/Isaac, Yhwd’/Juda), Yws’f/Joseph). Nevertheless, the nature of the Judaism practiced by the rulers is not clear and the Jewish nature of the kings rule was not frequently made explicit.

==== Conversion of king Abu Karib to Judaism ====
According to Arabian legends and folklore, king Abu Karib (r. 390–420) was the first Jewish convert. His conversion is thought to have followed a military expedition into northern Arabia in an effort to eliminate Byzantine influence, which sought to expand its influence in the peninsula. He reached and seized Yathrib (Medina), and there installed his son as governor. Later, he would learn that his son had been killed, and so he returned to besiege the city, during which the Jewish population fought against him. Abu Karib fell ill during the siege, but two Jewish scholars named Ka'b and As'ad were able to restore him to health. They also convinced him to lift the siege and make peace; afterwards, he and his army converted. When he returned home, he brought the scholars back with him into the capital, where he was able to convince the population to also convert. After his eventual death, it was reported that a pagan, Dhū-Shanatir, seized the throne as his children, whom he left to rule, were all still minors.

Historically, however, Judaism itself was introduced during the reign of Malkikarib Yuhamin, the father of Abu Karib.

==== The rise of Dhu Nuwas and the persecution of Christians in the Himyarite realms ====
According to the Martyrdom of Azqir, around 470-475, the Himyarite king Sharhabil Yakkuf ordered the execution of a Christian priest named Azqir for erecting a chapel with a cross in the city of Najran.

By the year 500, during the rule of the Jewish monarch Marthad'ilan Yu'nim (c. 480–502), the kingdom of Himyar exercised control over much of the Arabian peninsula. It was around this time that the Kingdom of Aksum invaded the peninsula, overthrowing the Himyarite king and installing the native Christian king, Ma'dikarib Ya'fur, in his place. A Himyarite prince and hardline follower of Judaism, Dhu Nuwas (who had attempted to overthrow the dynasty several years earlier), took power after Ma'dikarib Ya'fur had died via a coup d'état, assuming authority after killing the Aksumite garrison in Zafār. He proceeded to engage the Ethiopian guards and their Christian allies in the Tihāma coastal lowlands facing Abyssinia. After taking the port of Mukhawān, where he burnt down the local church, he advanced south as far as the fortress of Maddabān overlooking the Bab-el-Mandeb, where he expected Kaleb Ella Aṣbeḥa to land his fleet. The campaign eventually killed between 11,500 and 14,000, and took a similar number of prisoners. Mukhawān became his base, while he dispatched one of his generals, a Jewish prince named Sharaḥ'īl Yaqbul dhu Yaz'an, against Najrān, a predominantly Christian oasis, with a good number of Jews, who had supported with troops his earlier rebellion, but refused to recognize his authority after the massacre of the Aksumite garrison. The general blocked the caravan route connecting Najrān with Eastern Arabia.

==== The end of Jewish rule over Himyar ====
Dhu Nuwas went on to try combatting the Christianizing influence from the Kingdom of Aksum militarily and massacred the Christian community of Najran, which is in part documented by an inscription made by Sarah'il Yaqbul-Yaz'an, Ja 1028, which describes the burning of a church and slaughtering of Abyssinians (Ethiopian Christians), claiming thousands of deaths and prisoners. These events are also discussed in several contemporary Christian sources: in the writings of Procopius, Cosmas Indicopleustes, John Malalas, and Jacob of Serugh. Soon afterwards, John of Ephesus (d. 588) related a letter from another contemporary, Mar Simeon, directed to Abbot von Gabula about the events. In addition, an anonymous author produced the Book of the Himyarites, a sixth-century Syriac chronicle of the persecution and martyrdom of the Christians of Najran. This event led to a significant counterattack by the Ethiopian kingdom, leading to the conquest of Himyar in 525–530 and the ultimate defeat and deposition of Dhu Nuwas. This signified the end of the Jewish leadership of southern Arabia, and Kaleb appointed a Christian Himyarite, Sumyafa Ashwa, as his viceroy and vassal ruler of Himyar.

==== Sasanian conquest of Himyar ====
The Aksumite general Abraha eventually deposed Sumyafa Ashwa and took power, becoming the new ruler of Himyar. After Abraha's death, his son Masruq ibn Abraha continued the Aksumite vice-royalty in Yemen, resuming payment of tribute to the Aksumites. However, his maternal brother Ma'adi Yakrib revolted.

After being denied by Justinian, Ma'adi Yakrib sought help from Khosrow I, the Sassanid Persian Emperor, thus triggering the Aksumite–Persian wars. Khosrow I sent a small fleet and army under Persian military commander Wahrez to depose the king of Yemen. The war culminated with the Siege of Sanaa, capital of Aksumite Yemen. Following the capture of Sanaa by Sasanian forces, Wahrez placed Ma'adi Yakrib on the throne of Himyar as a vassal of the Sasanian Persian Empire.

In 575 or 578, the war resumed after Ma'adi Yakrib was killed by Aksumite servants. Wahrez led another army of 8000, ending Axumite overlordship in Yemen. Subsequently, Yemen was annexed by the Sasanian Empire as a province, and Wahrez was installed as its direct governor by the Sasanian emperor Khosrow I. Greater Yemen remained under firm Sasanian control until the rise of the Islamic prophet Muhammad in the early 7th century.

== Medieval Arab-Islamic tradition ==
Medieval Muslim historians and genealogists generally placed Himyar within the history and genealogy of the Arabs of Yemen. In the genealogical framework that became widespread in medieval Arabic literature, Himyar was traced through Sabaʾ to Qahtan, while Himyar and Kahlan were represented as two of the principal branches of the peoples of Yemen. Medieval writers including al-Hamdānī, Ibn Hazm, Ibn Kathir and Ibn Khaldun incorporated Himyar into this southern Arab genealogical tradition. Ibn Kathir described Himyar as the "Arabs of Yemen", while Ibn Khaldun counted Himyar and Kahlan among the Arabs. Ibn Hazm treated the tribes of Himyar within his Jamharat Ansab al-Arab ("Compendium of the Genealogies of the Arabs"), and al-Hamdānī devoted substantial portions of al-Iklīl to Himyarite genealogy within the wider Qahtanite framework. Modern historian Jawād ʿAlī notes that medieval transmitters and historians were nearly unanimous in regarding the Qahtanites as Arabs from their origins, while Wolfhart Heinrichs similarly summarizes the traditional classification by stating that genealogically Himyar formed part of the "Southern Arabs" represented by Qahtan.

These traditions also formed part of a wider Southern Arab identity in the medieval Islamic world. Peter Webb notes that early Islamic sources portray Yemenis as identifying themselves as ʿArab, and more specifically as "Southerners" or "Southern Arabs", represented by collective labels such as al-Yamāniya, al-Yaman and Qahtan in contrast to northern genealogical groupings associated with Adnan, Ma'add, Nizar and Mudar. Within this literary and genealogical environment, the history of Himyar, its kings and its lineages became an important component of the remembered pre-Islamic past of the southern Arabs.

== Religion ==
=== Polytheistic period ===
There is evidence from before the fourth century that the solar goddess Shams was especially favoured in Himyar, as the national goddess and possibly an ancestral deity.

=== Jewish period ===
During the fourth century onwards after the Himyarite kingdom (or at least its ruling class) converted to Judaism, or a Jewish-inflected monotheism, references to pagan gods disappeared from royal inscriptions and texts on public buildings, and were replaced by references to a single deity in official texts. Inscriptions in the Sabean language, and sometimes Hebrew, called this deity Rahmanan (The Merciful), “Lord of the Heavens and Earth,” the “God of Israel” and “Lord of the Jews”. Prayers invoking Rahman's blessings on the “people of Israel” in monumental inscriptions often ended with the Hebrew words shalom and amen.

There is scanter material regarding the religious affiliations of the locals. All inscriptions are monotheistic, but the religious identity of their authors is not always explicit. However, there is evidence for the practice of Judaism among locals as well. The name "Israel" appears in four inscriptions and replaces the earlier term shaʿb/community: one inscription from the fifth century mentions the "God of Israel". Three inscriptions mention the "God of the Jews". MAFRAY-Ḥaṣī 1, describes the construction of a graveyard specifically for the Jewish community. There is a Hebrew inscription known as DJE 23 from the village of Bayt Hadir, 15 km east of Sanaa. It lists the mishmarot ("guards"), enumerating the twenty-four Priestly families (and their place of residence in Galilee) appointed to protect the Solomon's Temple after the return of the Jews following the Babylonian exile. It is also written in biblical as opposed to Aramaic orthography. Mentions of synagogues, indicating the formal organization of Jews in Southern Arabia, are present in a fourth-century Sabaic inscription and a late sixth century Greek inscription from the port of Qāniʾ which uses the phrase eis Theos to refer to God and mentions a hagios topos, a phrase typically connoting a synagogue. Additional evidence is also known.

Christian Julien Robin argues that the epigraphic evidence argues against viewing the Judaism of Himyar as rabbinic. This is based on the absence of belief in the afterlife (shared by the Sadducees), the predominant use of a local language (Sabaic) as opposed to Hebrew, and the priestly emphasis of DJE 23, Himyarite Judaism may have been more "Priestly" than "Rabbinic". However, Iwona Gajda interprets DJE 23 as evidence for the presence of rabbinic Judaism, and further points to evidence that the loanwords present in Ḥasī 1 indicate that its author was strongly familiar with Jewish law.

Unfortunately, Jewish literary texts outside of Yemen do not discuss the Jewish community there. However, epigraphs from Palestine and Jordan do reflect communication and knowledge from the Yemenite Jewish community:

- An inscription from Palestine using the Sabaic script (a South Arabian script) is known.
- A Greek inscription from the village of Beit She'arim mentions the burial of a "Himyarite".
- A fifth-century Hebrew epitaph from Zoara, Jordan describes an individual named Ywsh br ʾWfy who "died in Ẓafār, the land of the Ḥimyarites".

These communication routes may have also transferred rabbinic and other Jewish teachings.

=== Christian period ===
During the Ethiopian Christian period, Christianity appears to have become the official religion. Many churches began to be built. For example, the inscription RIÉ 191, discovered in Axum, describes the construction of a church off the coast of Yemen. The Marib Dam inscription from 548 mentions a priest, a monastery, and an abbot of that monastery. As in the Himyarite period, Christian inscriptions continue to refer to the monotheistic deity using the name Rahmanan, but now these inscriptions are accompanied with crosses and references to Christ as the Messiah and the Holy Spirit. For example, one (damaged) inscription, as for example in Ist 7608 bis. Another extensive inscription, CIH 541, documents Abraha sponsoring the construction of a church at Marib, besides invoking/mentioning the Messiah, Spirit, and celebrations hosted by a priest at another church. Abraha celebrated the construction of the dam by holding mass in the city church and inviting ambassadors from Rome and Persia. Later Islamic historiography also ascribes to Abraha the construction of a church at Sanaa. Abraha's inscriptions bear a relatively low Christology, perhaps meant to assuage the Jewish population, and their formulae resemble descriptions of Jesus in the Quran. (The Jabal Dabub inscription is another South Arabian Christian graffito dating to the sixth century and containing a pre-Islamic variant of the Basmala.) Whereas Abraha's predecessor more explicitly denoted Jesus as the Son of Rahmanan and as "Victor" (corresponding to Aksumite description under Kaleb of Axum), and made use of Trinitarian formulae, Abraha began to only describe Jesus as God's "Messiah" (but not Son) and, in aligning himself more closely with Syriac Christianity, replaced Aksumite Christian with Syriac loanwords. The use of the phrase "Rahmanan and his son Christ the conqueror" in inscriptions from this time owes to the use of the Syriac loanword Masīḥ. More broadly, the separation of Abraha's Himyar from the Akumsite kingdom corresponded to its greater alignment with the Christianity espoused in Antioch and Syria. Inscriptions from this region disappear after 560. Abraha's influence would end up extending across the regions he conquered, including regions of eastern Arabia, central Arabia, Medina in the Hejaz, and an unidentified site called Gzm.

== Warfare and conquests ==
=== Conquests ===
At its largest, the Himyarite Kingdom conquered much of the Arabian Peninsula, including vast swathes of western, central, eastern, and northeastern Arabia, all the way up to lower Iraq and possibly even Palestine. This seems to have happened at two different times in the history of Himyar: around the mid-fifth century, and again a hundred years later, in the mid-sixth century during the reign of Abraha. Inscriptions directly document Himyarite rule over the following tribes and regions (with a notable absence of the oasis cities of the northern Hejaz):

- Central Arabia: Ma'add, a large tribal confederation; Ma’sal Gumḥān (200 km west of Riyadh), Ḥalibān (90 km south-west of Maʾsal), Khargān (Arabic: Al-Kharj); Gawwān (al-Jaww), Birkum (Birk), Sharafān (al-Sharaf), Nīrān (al-Nīr), Yamāmatān (al-Yamāma), ‘Aramatum (al-‘Arama), Abānum (Abān), Rumatān (al-Ruma), Turabān (Turabān)
- Eastern and northeastern Arabia: The tribes of ‘Abdqaysān (Ar. ‘Abd al-Qays), Iyādhum (Ar. Iyād), Tanūkh, the toponym Hagarum (Hajar)
- Western Arabia: The tribal confederation of Muḍar, the tribes Nizārum and Ghassān; the toponyms Sigāh (Sijā) and Siyyān (al-Siyy, 100–200 km northeast of Mecca), and dhu-Murākh (uncertain location)

These captures were not permanent, and sometimes, power over these areas was lost back to Himyar's competitors, such as the Lakhmid kingdom and their patrons, the Sasanian Empire.

=== Weapons ===
As the Byzantines were usually equipped with armored horses, Indian fenestrated battle axe, round shield, spear, and scale or mail armor, Paul Yule argued that the Himyarite soldiers were armed in comparable fashion, if not as consistently.

== International relations ==
The Himyarites had relations with various tribes, states, and empires around them over the course of the centuries of their domination of South Arabia. After Himyar conquered and unified Yemen under its rule, it sent ambassadors to the Romans and Sasanians to reassure them of future cordial relations, although the mission to the Sasanian court may have failed. In fact, a Sasanian ally may have soon launched an attack against one of Himyar's allies in South Arabia, according to the Namara inscription. Nevertheless, an informal or implicit alliance may have formed between the two later on.

One of the earliest documented relations with the Romans took place in the fourth century during the reign of Constantius II, when the latter tried to convert them to Christianity and form an alliance. However, Himyar did not accept this conversion, and later leaned into a Jewish identity in the late fourth century, all the way until the Aksumite invasion of Himyar brought Christian rule into the region in the early sixth century.

In the time of Abraha, an international conference was held by Himyar that included ambassadors and delegations sent by the Romans, Persians, Ghassanids, and the Lakhmids (documented in CIH 541).

== Language ==
Himyarite inscription of King Dhu Nuwas left near Najran, Saudi Arabia. Dated to the 6th century AD

It is a matter of debate whether the Ṣayhadic Himyarite language was spoken in the south-western Arabian peninsula until the 10th century. The few 'Himyarite' texts seem to be rhymed.

== Himyarite dynasties after the coming of Islam ==
After the spread of Islam in Yemen, Himyarite noble families were able to re-establish control over parts of Yemen.

- Yufirid Dynasty over most of Yemen (847–997)
- Mahdid Dynasty over Southern Tihama (1159–1174)
- Manakhis over Taiz (ninth century)

Many Himyarites participated in the Muslim conquest of Syria in the 630s and, along with other South Arabian tribes, settled in city of Homs after its capture in 637. The city became the center of these tribes in Islamic Syria, which served as the center of the Caliphate during Umayyad rule (661–750). The two principal Himyarite families that established themselves in Homs were the Dhu Asbah and Dhu'l-Kala. The latter had been the most influential family in South Arabia before the advent of Islam there.

Among the leaders of the conquering Muslim troops was the Himyarite prince Samayfa ibn Nakur of the Dhu'l-Kala. The Asbah chief Kurayb ibn Abraha Abu Rishdin led the Himyar of Homs, but he later moved to Egypt with most of the Dhu Asbah. Members of that family, Abraha ibn Sabbah and his son Abu Shamir, had participated in the Muslim conquest of Egypt in 640–641. Samayfa was another dominant figure of the city and was referred to in the early Muslim sources as the "king of Himyar". During the governorship of Syria by Mu'awiya ibn Abi Sufyan (640s–661), the Himyarites supported him against Caliph Ali (r. 656–661) during the First Muslim Civil War. At the Battle of Siffin with Ali in 657, Samayfa led the Homs contingent in Mu'awiya's army and was slain. He was succeeded by his son Shurahbil as the power-broker of the Homs tribesmen.

According to the historian Werner Caskel, the Himyar and the other South Arabian tribes of Homs, including the Hamdan, formed a confederation called after their supposed ancestor Qahtan in opposition to the Quda'a confederation, whose constituent tribes had long resided in Syria before the advent of Islam. To the chagrin of the South Arabians in Homs and the Qays tribes of northern Syria, the Quda'a, led by the Banu Kalb tribe, held the supreme position among the tribal groups in the courts of the first Umayyad caliphs Mu'awiya ibn Abi Sufyan (r. 661–680) and Yazid I (r. 680–683). With the strong presence of the Himyarite elite and South Arabian tribesmen in Homs, their scholars there developed and propagated an ideology of Qahtanite preeminence that sought to compete with the elite groups of Islam, including the Quraysh, whose members held the office of the caliph. To that end, they composed and transmitted narratives of the pre-Islamic South Arabian kingdoms, including war stories of these kings' far-flung conquests and heroics and tales of their wealth.

After the deaths of Yazid I and his son and successor Mu'awiya II in 683 and 684, respectively, the Qahtan and the Qays backed the rival caliphate of Abd Allah ibn al-Zubayr, who was based in Mecca, while the Quda'a supported the candidacy of the Umayyad Marwan I. Kurayb ibn Abraha also backed Ibn al-Zubayr in Egypt. The Qahtan joined Ibn al-Zubayr's representative in Syria, Dahhak ibn Qays al-Fihri, in the Battle of Marj Rahit against Marwan and the Quda'a in 684. The latter decisively won that battle. Afterward, Dahhak's commander in Homs, Nu'man ibn Bashir al-Ansari, was tracked down and killed by the Dhu'l-Kala. A member of the family who had served as the head of Yazid I's shurta (select troops), Khalid ibn Ma'dan ibn Abi Karib, decapitated Nu'man and sent his head to Marwan I. Not long after Marj Rahit, Qahtan and Quda'a reconciled under unclear circumstances and formed the super-tribal group of the Yaman in alliance against the Qays. (Note: In forming the pact, the Kalb and Quda'a changed their genealogical descent to Himyar from the north Arabian tribe of Ma'add.) The resulting Qays–Yaman rivalry for political power and privilege persisted through the remainder of Umayyad rule.

In 686 Shurahbil ibn Dhi'l-Kala, the leader of the Himyar in Syria, was slain commanding his troops in the Umayyad army at the Battle of Khazir. As a consequence, the Himyar in Homs "sank to military insignificance", according to the historian Wilferd Madelung. Khalid ibn Ma'dan maintained his position of prestige with the Umayyad dynasty and Syrian Muslim society in general, having shifted to a new role as a prominent Muslim scholar. Kurayb's cousin Ayyub ibn Shurahbil ibn Sabbah served as the governor of Egypt under Caliph Umar II (r. 717–720), while a Dhu'l-Kala member, Imran ibn al-Nu'man, served as the Caliph's governor of Sind.

During the Third Muslim Civil War, the Dhu Asbah tribesmen who had remained in South Arabia are recorded among the supporters of the Kharijite leader Abu Hamza. A possible member of the family in Syria, Nadr ibn Yarim, led a summertime military expedition against the Byzantines under the Abbasid caliph al-Saffah (r. 750–754).

== Ancestral divisions of Himyar ==
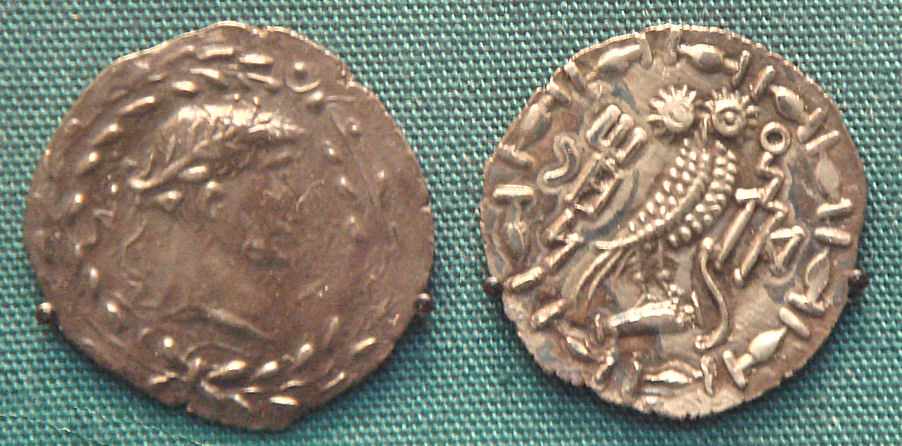
Coin of the Himyarite Kingdom, southern coast of the Arabian Peninsula, in which ships passing between Egypt and India would stop. This is an imitation of a coin of Augustus. 1st Century CE.

- Himyar: The most famous of whose septs were Zaid Al-Jamhur, Banu Quda'a and Sakasik.
- Kahlan: The most famous of whose septs were Hamdan, Azd, Anmar, Ṭayy (today their descendants are known as Shammar), Midhhij, Kinda, Lakhm, Judham

Kahlan septs emigrated from Yemen to dwell in the different parts of the Arabian Peninsula prior to the Great Flood (Sail Al-‘Arim of Marib Dam), due to the failure of trade under the Roman pressure and domain on both sea and land trade routes following Roman occupation of Egypt and Syria.

Naturally enough, the competition between Kahlan and Ḥimyar led to the evacuation of the first and the settlement of the second in Yemen.

The emigrating septs of Kahlan can be divided into four groups:

- Azd: Who, under the leadership of ‘Imrān bin ‘Amr Muzaiqbā’, wandered in Yemen, sent pioneers and finally headed northwards. Details of their emigration can be summed up as follows:
  - Tha‘labah bin ‘Amr left his tribe Al-Azd for Ḥijāz and dwelt between Tha‘labiyah and Dhī Qār. When he gained strength, he headed for Madīnah where he stayed. Of his seed are Aws and Khazraj, sons of Haritha bin Tha‘labah.
  - Haritha bin ‘Amr, known as Khuzā‘ah, wandered with his people in Hijaz until they came to Mar Az-Zahran. They conquered the Ḥaram, and settled in Makkah after having driven away its people, the tribe of Jurhum.
  - ‘Imrān bin ‘Amr and his folks went to ‘Oman where they established the tribe of Azd whose children inhabited Tihama and were known as Azd-of-Shanu’a.
  - Jafna bin ‘Amr and his family, headed for Syria where he settled and initiated the kingdom of Ghassan who was so named after a spring of water, in Ḥijāz, where they stopped on their way to Syria.
- Lakhm and Judham: Of whom was Nasr bin Rabi‘a, father of Manadhira, Kings of al-Hirah.
- Banū Ṭayy: Who also emigrated northwards to settle by the so- called Aja and Salma Mountains which were consequently named as Tai’ Mountains. The tribe later became the tribe of Shammar.
- Kinda: Who dwelt in Bahrain but were expelled to Hadramout and Najd where they instituted a powerful government but not for long, for the whole tribe soon faded away.

Another tribe of Himyar, known as Banū Quḑā'ah, also left Yemen and dwelt in Samāwah on the borders of Iraq.

However, it is estimated that the majority of the Ḥimyar Christian royalty migrated into Jordan, Al-Karak, where initially they were known as Banū Ḥimyar (Sons of Ḥimyar). Many later on moved to central Jordan to settle in Madaba under the family name of Al-Hamarneh (pop 12,000, est. 2010)

== See also ==
- Ancient history of Yemen
- Yemenite Jews
- Ethiopian–Persian wars
- List of Jewish states and dynasties
- Dhu'l-Kala Samayfa
- Sa'b Dhu Marathid

== Bibliography ==
- Adler, Joseph (May–June 2000). "The Jewish Kingdom of Himyar (Yemen): Its Rise and Fall". Midstream. 46 (4).
- Al-Qadi, Wadad (2009). "A Documentary Report on Umayyad Stipends Registers (Dīwān al-ʿAtaʾ) in Abū Zurʿa's Tārīkh". Quaderni di Studi Arabi. 4: 7–44. JSTOR 25803083.
- Bafaqīh, M. ‛A. (1990). L'unification du Yémen antique. La lutte entre Saba', Himyar et le Hadramawt de Ier au IIIème siècle de l'ère chrétienne. Paris: Bibliothèque de Raydan.
- Crone, Patricia (1994). "Were the Qays and Yemen of the Umayyad Period Political Parties?". Der Islam. 71 (1). Berlin: Walter de Gruyter & Co.: 1–57. doi:10.1515/islm.1994.71.1.1. ISSN 0021-1818. S2CID 154370527.
- Crone, Patricia (2003) [1980]. Slaves on Horses: The Evolution of the Islamic Polity (2003 ed.). Cambridge: Cambridge University Press. ISBN 978-0521529402.
- de Maigret, Alessandro (2002). Arabia Felix. Translated by Rebecca Thompson. London: Stacey International. ISBN 978-1-900988-07-0.
- Korotayev, Andre (1995). ANCIENT YEMEN (Oxford University Press, 1995). Oxford: Oxford University Press. ISBN 978-0-19-922237-7. Archived from the original on 29 November 2023..
- Korotayev, Andrey (1996). Pre-Islamic Yemen. Wiesbaden: Harrassowitz Verlag. ISBN 978-3-447-03679-5.
- Madelung, Wilferd (Autumn 1986). "Apocalyptic Prophecies in Hims in the Umayyad Age". Journal of Semitic Studies. 31 (2).
- Miller, Nathaniel (2024). The Emergence of Arabic Poetry: From Regional Identities to Islamic Canonization. University of Pennsylvania Press. ISBN 978-1-5128-2531-2.
- Robin, Christian Julien (2012), "Arabia and Ethiopia", in Johnson, Scott Fitzgerald (ed.), The Oxford Handbook of Late Antiquity, translated by Arietta Papaconstantinou, Oxford: Oxford University Press, pp. 247–334, ISBN 978-0-19-533693-1.
- Robin, Christian J. (2014). "The peoples beyond the Arabian frontier in late antiquity: recent epigraphic discoveries and latest advances" (PDF). Inside and Out. Interactions between Rome and the Peoples on the Arabian and Egyptian Frontiers in Late Antiquity. Peeters. pp. 33–79.
- Segovia, Carlos (2018). The Quranic Jesus: A New Interpretation. De Gruyter.
- Stupperich, R.; Yule, Paul (2014). "Ḥimyarite Period Bronze Sculptural Groups from the Yemenite Highlands". In A. Sedov (ed.). Arabian and Islamic Studies A Collection of Papers in Honour of Mikhail Borishovic Piotrovskij on the Occasion of his 70th Birthday. Moscow: Gosudarstvennyĭ muzeĭ Vostoka. pp. 338–67. ISBN 978-5-903417-63-6.
- Yule, Paul (2007). Himyar Late Antique Yemen/Die Spätantike im Jemen. Aichwald. ISBN 978-3-929290-35-6.
- Yule, Paul (2005). "Zafar-The Capital of the Ancient Himyarite Empire Rediscovered". Jemen-Report. 36: 22–29.
- Yule, Paul (2013). Late Antique Arabia Ẓafār, Capital of Ḥimyar, Rehabilitation of a 'Decadent' Society, Excavations of the Ruprecht-Karls-Universität Heidelberg 1998–2010 in the Highlands of the Yemen. Vol. 29. Wiesbaden: Abhandlungen Deutsche Orient-Gesellschaft. ISBN 978-3-447-06935-9.
