= Sasanian Yemen =

Province of the Sasanian Empire

Yaman
- Province of the Sasanian Empire
- 570–628
- Map of the Sasanian Empire, with Yemen located in the southern part of the Arabian Peninsula
- Capital: Sana'a
- Historical era: Antiquity
  - Siege of Sana'a (570): 570
  - Sasanian reconquest of Yemen: 575 or 578
  - The Sasanian nobles make an alliance with Muhammad: 628
Preceded by	Succeeded by
Kingdom of Aksum	First Islamic State
- Today part of: Yemen

Yemen (Middle Persian: Yaman) was a province of the Sasanian Empire in Late Antiquity in southwestern Arabia.

== History ==
Yemen was conquered in 570 by a small expeditionary aswaran force led by the Sasanian veteran Vahrez−the Himyarite prince Sayf ibn Dhi-Yazan was then appointed as a vassal king of the Sasanians in the country, whilst Vahrez went back to the Sasanian capital of Ctesiphon. One of the main reasons behind the Sasanian conquest was due to their interest in dominating the trade route from Constantinople to India and the Far East, which was now possible with their authority established in Yemen.

However, in 575 or 578, Sayf was killed by the Ethiopians during an uprising, which forced Vahrez to return to Yemen with a force of 4,000 men, and expel the Ethiopians once again. He then installed Sayf's son Ma'di Karib as the new king of Yemen. A large Iranian garrison was this time established in Yemen, with Vahrez as its governor. The Iranian soldiers and bureaucrats started intermarrying with the local population; their offspring became known as the al-Abna' ("the sons"). It is uncertain whether they kept practicing Zoroastrianism, or had been influenced by the South Arabian paganism and the local Christianity. According to al-Tabari, Vahrez's successors were; his son Marzban; his grandson Binagar; his great-grandson Khurrah Khosrow; and then a certain Badhan, who was unrelated to the family of Vahrez.

After the overthrow and death of the last prominent Sasanian king (shah) Khosrow II in 628, the Iranian nobles of Yemen made an alliance with the Islamic prophet Muhammad, and thus the country became part of the Islamic political structure. The abna' retained their distinct identity during the Islamic period, but were gradually absorbed into the local population and thus disappeared from records. Their nisba was al-Abnāwī.

== List of governors ==
Date	Governor
571-575	Saif ibn Dhi Yazan
575 (or 578)-?	Vahrez
?-?	Marzban
?-?	Binagar
?-?	Khurrah Khosrow
?-628	Badhan

== See also ==
- Bahram Gushnasp

== Sources ==
- Bosworth, C. E. (1983). "Abnāʾ". Encyclopaedia Iranica, Vol. I, Fasc. 3. pp. 226–228.
- Potts, Daniel T. (2012). "ARABIA ii. The Sasanians and Arabia". Encyclopaedia Iranica.
- Zakeri, Mohsen (1995). Sāsānid Soldiers in Early Muslim Society: The Origins of ʿAyyārān and Futuwwa. Wiesbaden: Otto Harrassowitz. ISBN 978-3-447-03652-8.
