= Badhan (Persian governor) =

Sassanid governor of Yemen during the reign of Khosrow II

Bādhān (in Arabic: باذان [bæːˈðæːn]; also Bādhām باذام [bæːˈðæːm] in Islamic historiography) was a Persian abna' leader and the Sasanian governor of Yemen during the reign of Khosrow II (r. 590–628). He became a Muslim and one of the disciples (Sahaba) of Islamic prophet Muhammad upon witnessing a prophecy of his come true in real time.

== Biography ==
During the reign of Khosrow II, Badhan was appointed as the Sasanian governor of Sana'a. According to Islamic tradition, during his rule, Muhammad had started preaching the new faith of Islam. Badhan sent reports about this new faith to Khosrow. Muhammad had sent a letter to Khosrow inviting him to convert to Islam. Khosrow tore up the letter on seeing his name written after the name of Muhammad in the letter and ordered Badhan to send some men to Medina to bring Muhammad to Khosrow himself in Ctesiphon. Badhan sent two men for this task. When these two men met Muhammad and demanded he come with them, Muhammad refused. Instead, he prophesied that Khosrow had been overthrown and murdered by his son Kavadh II, his stomach torn just like he had torn Muhammed's letter. He also prophesied that if Badhan converted to Islam he would be able to keep his throne. The two men returned to Badhan with the news regarding Khosrow. Badhan waited to ascertain the truthfulness of this disclosure. When it proved to be true, Badhan converted to Islam. The two men and the Persians living in Yemen and outside Yemen followed the example of Badhan and also converted to Islam. Thereafter, Badhan sent a message to Muhammad, informing him of his conversion to Islam.

Badhan died in 632, and was succeeded briefly by his son Shahr, who was killed in battle against Al-Aswad Al-Ansi, an apostate who had declared himself as a prophet when Muhammad became ill after his final pilgrimage to Mecca. Ansi attacked San'a and Shahr was killed. He married Shahr's widow and declared himself ruler of Yemen.

== See also ==
- Ancient history of Yemen
- Islamic history of Yemen
- Ridda wars
- Fayruz al-Daylami
- List of non-Arab Sahaba
- Kilakarai
- Old Jumma Masjid Of Kilakarai

== Sources ==
- Zakeri, Mohsen (1995). Sāsānid Soldiers in Early Muslim Society: The Origins of ʿAyyārān and Futuwwa. Wiesbaden: Otto Harrassowitz. ISBN 978-3-447-03652-8.
- Bosworth, C.E. (1983). "Abnāʾ". Encyclopaedia Iranica, Vol. I, Fasc. 3. pp. 226–228.
- Potts, Daniel T. (2012). "ARABIA ii. The Sasanians and Arabia". Encyclopaedia Iranica.
- Bosworth, C.E. (2012). "Bādhām, Bādhān". In Bearman, P.; Bianquis, Th.; Bosworth, C.E.; van Donzel, E.; Heinrichs, W.P. (eds.). Encyclopedia of Islam, Second Edition. doi:10.1163/1573-3912_islam_SIM_8385. ISBN 9789004161214.
- Fayda, Mustafa (1992). "BÂZÂN". TDV Encyclopedia of Islam, Vol. 5 (Balaban – Beşi̇r Ağa) (in Turkish). Istanbul: Presidency of Religious Affairs, Centre for Islamic Studies. pp. 283–284. ISBN 978-975-389-432-6.
