= Siege of Sanaa (570) =

Part of the Aksumite–Persian wars of the 6th century

- Part of the Aksumite–Persian wars
Date	570
Location	Sanaa, Kingdom of Aksum 15°21′N 44°12′E
Result	Sasanian victory; Sayf ibn Dhi Yazan is restored as king of Yemen as a vassal state of the Sasanian Empire

Belligerents
Sasanian Empire	Kingdom of Aksum Barbaria (region)

Commanders and leaders
Wahrez	

Strength
c. 700	Unknown

Casualties and losses
Unknown	Unknown
- Location within Yemen

The siege of Sanaa is a pre-Islamic battle fought in the 6th century by the Kingdom of Aksum and the Sasanian Empire, during the Aksumite–Persian wars. It took place when the Sasanian under general Vahrez besieged the Aksumite city of Sanaa in 570.

bn Hishām transmits a poem attributed to ʿAdī ibn Zayd describing the fall of the Aksumite kingdom following the Persian invasion. The poem includes the line: “On the day they call upon Āl Barbar and al-Yaksūm (Aksum), none of its fugitives shall escape.” the poem was made in reference to the joint axumite barbar retreat from Siege of Sanaa (570).

== Sources ==
- Bosworth, C. E. (1983). "Abnāʾ". Encyclopaedia Iranica, Vol. I, Fasc. 3. pp. 226–228.
- Potts, Daniel T. (2012). "ARABIA ii. The Sasanians and Arabia". Encyclopaedia Iranica.
- Zakeri, Mohsen (1995). Sāsānid Soldiers in Early Muslim Society: The Origins of ʿAyyārān and Futuwwa. Wiesbaden: Otto Harrassowitz. ISBN 978-3-447-03652-8.
