= Al-Sharaf =

Al-Sharaf الشرف
- Sub-district
- Location in Yemen
- Coordinates: 14°04′32″N 44°13′24″E
- Country: Yemen
- Governorate: Ibb Governorate
- District: Al Makhadir District

Population (2004)
  - Total: 9,860
- Time zone: UTC+3

Al-Sharaf (Arabic: الشرف) is a sub-district located in Al Makhadir District, Ibb Governorate, Yemen. Al-Sharaf had a population of 9860 as of 2004.
