= Saif ibn Dhi Yazan =

Semi-legendary Himyarite king of Yemen (6th century CE)

Saif ibn Dhi Yazan al-Himyari
- Himyarite king
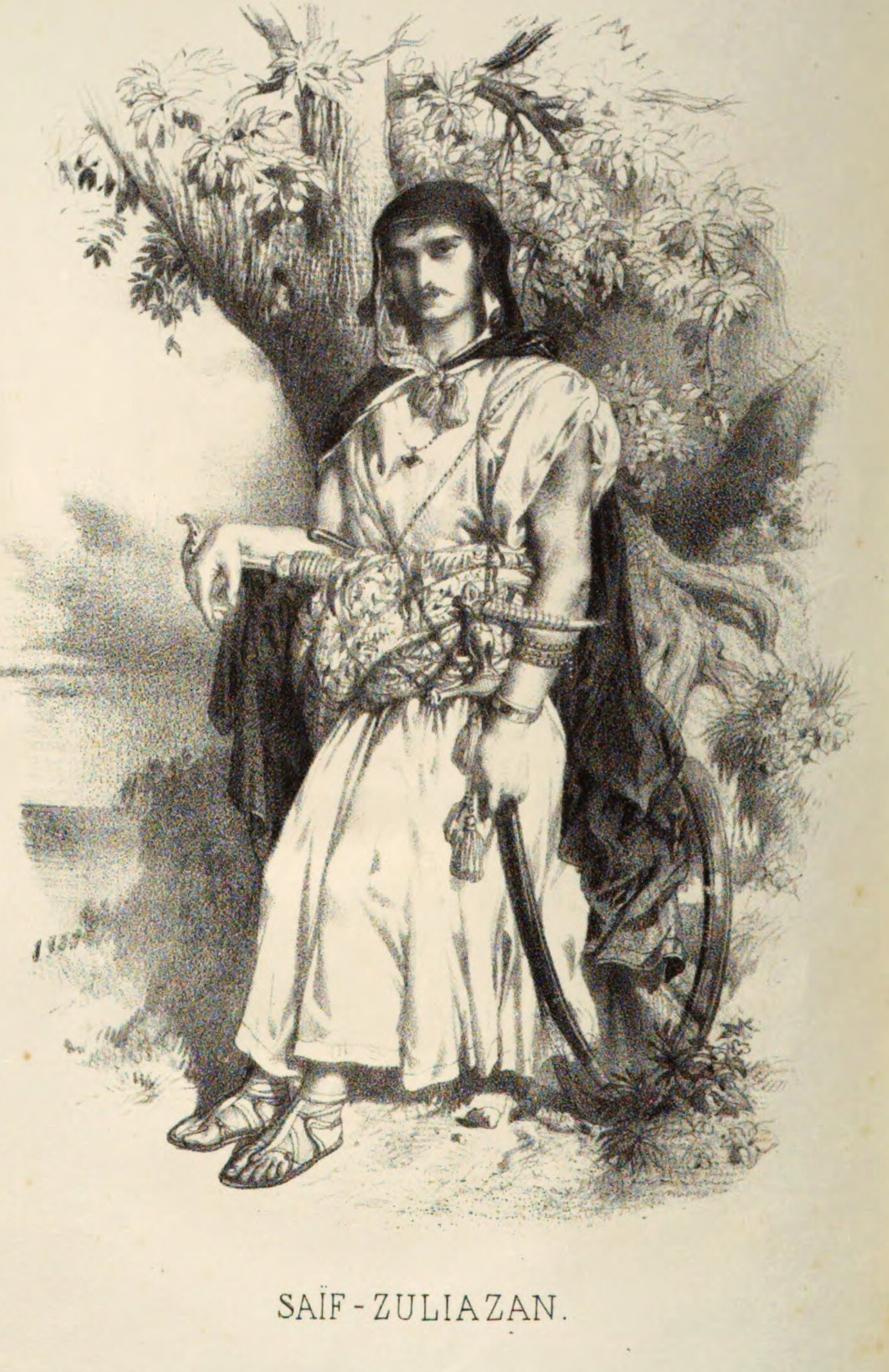
- An imaginary depiction of Saif ibn Dhi Yazan by Ali Bey in 1847
- Reign: c. 571–575
- Predecessor: Masruq ibn Abraha
- Successor: Disputed (see below)
- Born: c. 516 CE; Sana'a, Yemen
- Died: c. 575 CE; Sana'a, Yemen
Names
- Disputed: Abu Murrah Saif ibn Dhi Yazan al-Himyari; Shurahbil ibn 'Amr; Ma'dikarib ibn Abi Murrah al-Fayyad
- House: Dhu Yazan tribe
- Mother: Rayhana bint Dhi Jadan
- Religion: Judaism

Saif ibn Dhi Yazan al-Himyari (Arabic: سَيْف بِن ذِي يَزَن الحِمْيَريّ) or simply known as Saif ibn Dhi Yazan, was a semi-legendary Himyarite king who lived in the 6th century CE. He is well-known in the Aksumite-Persian wars for his role in expelling the Aksumites out of Yemen and is considered as the liberator of Yemen.

== Name ==
Abu Muhammad al-Hasan al-Hamdani narrated that the real name of Saif ibn Dhi Yazan was Shurahbil ibn 'Amr, and he was nicknamed Saif because of his courage and fearless aura. Contrary to this, Ibn Hisham narrated that his real name was Ma'dikarib ibn Abi Murrah al-Fayyad. Tabari narrated both views in his Tarikh al-Tabari, as well as an additional view that his real name was Saifan ibn Ma'dikarib. Saifur Rahman Mubarakpuri, however, combines Ibn Hisham's and Tabari's views and states that his real name is Ma'dikarib ibn Saif Dhi Yazan al-Himyari.

As for the epithet in his patronymic, Dhi Yazan, it is in reference to the tribe of Dhu Yazan which was an elite ruling family during the time of the Himyarite Kingdom. This family had also converted to Judaism at a time as early as the late 4th century CE.

== Early life ==
Saif ibn Dhi Yazan was born to the Dhu Yazan family around 516 CE in the town of Sana'a. During his birth, the kingdom was under the rule of the Aksumite client king, Ma'dikarib Ya'fur. Saif lived during the time of the persecution of Christians by the Jewish zealot Dhu Nuwas as well as the subsequent conquest of Himyar by the Aksumite Empire. Eventually, Saif's father was forcibly exiled from Yemen by Abraha so that the latter could marry his wife Rayhana bint Dhi Jadan, the daughter of Dhu Jadan al-Himyari. This marriage resulted in Abraha having stronger relations with the Yemeni family of Dhu Jadan, as well as the birth of Saif's half-brother Masruq ibn Abraha.

== Reign ==
=== Ending the Aksumite rule over Himyar ===
When Saif ibn Dhi Yazan was older, he asked for help from the Byzantine Empire for assistance to remove his half-brother Masruq from the throne of Himyar, but his pleas for help were denied by them as Masruq and the Byzantines shared a common religion. Saif proceeded to meet with the Lakhmid king Al-Nu'man III ibn al-Mundhir, who pitied him and then brought him to the Sasanian Empire, where Saif explained his request for help to Khosrow I. When Khosrow asked him to prove his worth, Saif convinced him that they were related by their fair skin colours as opposed to the dark colour of the Abyssinian people:

Saif then departed to seek the help of Kisra Anushirwan (Khosrow I), to whom he claimed to be related, and asked for his aid. Kisra asked, “What tie of kinship do you claim with me?” He answered, “O king, it is my white skin as opposed to the black, for I am closer to you than they are.”

The latter agreed to Saif's request, on condition that Yemen be a vassal state of the Sasanian Empire. The general Wahrez was sent alongside Saif and a fleet of Sasanian soldiers. Tabari reports that at least eight ships sailed from the coast of Persia to Yemen, one of which was carrying Saif and Wahrez; two ships reportedly sunk in the journey.

=== Becoming the king of Himyar ===
After Masruq ibn Abraha had been killed in the battle, the Sasanian forces placed Saif ibn Dhi Yazan on the throne of Himyar as a vassal king who would be required to send a yearly tribute to Khosrow I. During this time, Saif received a delegation from the Quraysh which included the elderly Abdul Muttalib. Both men had a conversation, and Saif informed Abdul Muttalib that his grandson, the future prophet Muhammad, would receive prophecy someday and break all the idols in Mecca. The historian Ignác Goldziher denies the existence of any Quraysh delegation ever meeting Saif, and he states that the story of the delegation was invented by the Yemenis as a form of apology for having degraded the Quraysh.

== Death and succession ==
Saif ibn Dhi Yazan was eventually stabbed to death by one of his Abyssinian servants, between the years 575–578. News of his assassination reached Persia, and again, the Sasanian troops under Wahrez were deployed to Yemen, where they conquered it and started the period of rule known as Sasanian Yemen.

=== Succession ===
Encyclopedia Iranica states that a king named Ma'dikarib, probably Saif's son, was installed as his successor. However, Safiur Rahman Mubarakpuri disagrees and stated that after Saif had died, the Yemenis were completely deprived from ruling by the Persians until the rise of Islam in Yemen.

== Historicity ==
An extremely legendary biographical book titled Sīrat Sayf ibn Dhī-Yazan has been attributed to him, and it features Saif going on extraordinary conquests including the realm of the jinn. Both historical and fictional narratives are blended together in this book. The book also describes the Aksumite Empire being adherent to South Arabian polytheism, contrary to reality where the Aksumites were actually Christians.

=== Chronological errors ===
Al-Nu'man III ibn al-Mundhir, the king whom introduces Saif to the Sasanians, begins his reign around 580–583 CE, more than ten years after the death of Khosrow I.

== In popular culture ==
The story of Saif ibn Dhi Yazan served as inspiration in Malaysian literature, especially in the story of a king named Yusuf Dzu Yazin. The name Yazan is also a popular male given name for Muslims.

Saif has been referenced in Yemeni politics. The Yemeni revolutionary, Muhammad Mahmoud Al-Zubairi, saw Saif as an inspiration and mentioned him a few times to lift the spirits of his followers. Abdulaziz Al-Maqaleh also wrote a poem regarding Saif and his liberation of Yemen.

A Jordanian television show about the story of Saif ibn Dhi Yazan was broadcast in 1982.

== See also ==
- List of rulers of Saba and Himyar

== Sources ==
- Bosworth, C. E., ed. (1999). The History of al-Ṭabarī, Volume V: The Sāsānids, the Byzantines, the Lakhmids, and Yemen. SUNY Series in Near Eastern Studies. Albany, New York: State University of New York Press. ISBN 978-0-7914-4355-2.
- Zakeri, Mohsen (1995). Sāsānid Soldiers in Early Muslim Society: The Origins of ʿAyyārān and Futuwwa. Wiesbaden: Otto Harrassowitz. ISBN 978-3-447-03652-8.
- Bosworth, C. E. (1983). "Abnāʾ". Encyclopaedia Iranica, Vol. I, Fasc. 3. pp. 226–228.
- Potts, Daniel T. (2012). "ARABIA ii. The Sasanians and Arabia". Encyclopaedia Iranica.
- The Oxford handbook of late antiquity. Oxford handbooks. Oxford New York: Oxford University Press. 2012. ISBN 978-0-19-533693-1.
