= Ma'dikarib Ya'fur =

- King of Saba', Dhu Raydan, Hadramawt, Yamnat and their Arabs, on Tawdum and Tihamat
- Reign: 515–521
- Predecessor: Marthad'ilan Yanuf
- Successor: Dhu Nuwas
- Died: c. 521
- Religion: Christianity

Ma'dikarib Ya'fur (Arabic: معد كرب يعفر) also romanized as Mu'di Karab Ya'fir, was a Himyarite king who ruled in the 6th century CE. Ma'dikarib Ya'fur was an adherent to Christianity, and served as a vassal ruler over Yemen under the Aksumite Empire. His rule is only attested to in two archaeological inscriptions which date to around 521 CE.

== Name ==
The name Ma'dikarib Ya'fur is present in two inscriptions, dated to around 521 CE which are also the only inscriptions with his name present in them. One of these inscriptions, found in Najd, gives Ma'dikarib Ya'fur the full title of King of Saba', Dhu Raydan, Hadramawt, Yamnat and their Arabs, on Tawdum and Tihamat. Alternatively, his name has also been romanized as Mu'di Karab Ya'fir.

== Reign ==
Ma'dikarib Ya'fur was a vassal king whom was appointed by the Aksumite Empire (presumably after the death of his predecessor, Marthad'ilan Yanuf). In 521 CE, the Lakhmid king, al-Mundhir III ibn al-Nu'man invaded parts of South Arabia, which forced the Arab tribes living in the affected areas to plead for help from Ma'dikarib Ya'fur. He agreed to their request, and later in the same year him and the tribes of the Sabaeans, Himyarites, Hadhramites, Kindites and a force of Bedouins marched onwards against the Lakhmid forces.

=== End of reign ===
Ma'dikarib Ya'fur suffered a financial crisis during his reign and was forced to borrow a loan of money from a Christian merchant who lived in Najran. He eventually died under unknown circumstances around the years 521–522, and his death was attested to in a letter by his successor, Dhu Nuwas.

== Identification with Dhu Shanatir ==
Ma'dikarib Ya'fur does not exist in the Arabian legends, and is instead replaced by a king named Dhu Shanatir whom is described as having a tyrannical rule. The historians Franz Altheim and Ruth Stehl, in their work Die Araber in der alten Welt, proposed that Ma'dikarib Ya'fur was only the regnal name taken up by Dhu Shanatir when he ascended to the throne. Ben Abrahamson suggests that Ma'dikarib Ya'fur was the nephew of Dhu Shanatir, who was forced to flee to Hirah after his uncle was murdered by Dhu Nuwas.

== See also ==
- Dhu Shanatir
- List of rulers of Saba' and Himyar
