= Masruq ibn Abraha =

Ethiopian ruler of Yemen under the Aksumite Empire

- King of Himyar
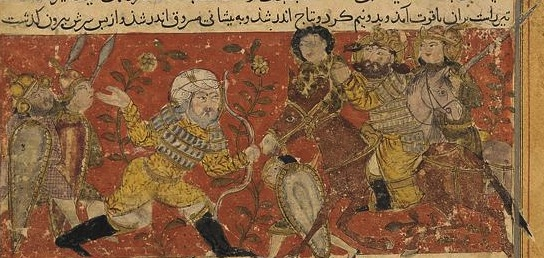
- "The arrow of old Wahrez kills Masruq, the Abyssinian King of Yemen", Persian miniature from Bal'ami's Tarikhnama
- Reign: 570–571
- Predecessor: Yaksum ibn Abraha
- Successor: Aksumite rule in South Arabia abolished: Saif ibn Dhi Yazan as king of Sasanian Yemen (semi-legendary)
- Born: c. 510; Kingdom of Aksum
- Died: c. 570; Hadhramaut, Kingdom of Aksum
Names
- Masruq ibn Abraha al-Ashram
- Religion: Christianity

Masrūq ibn Abraha (Arabic: مسروق بن أبرهة) was the last Aksumite ruler of Yemen, as in both Arabic tradition and later Islamic literature. He succeeded his brother, Yaksum. In 570 or 571, he was killed in the Battle of Hadhramaut in the Yemeni campaign of Wahrez, reportedly by an arrow shot by Wahrez himself.
