= Wahrez =

6th-century Sassanid Persian military general

Wahriz
- Bōē
- Born: Sasanian Empire
- Other names: Boes, Wahriz
- Children: Nawzadh; Marzbān
- Military career
- Allegiance: Sasanian Empire
- Branch: Sasanian army Sasanian navy

Wahrez (born Boe or Bōē) was a Sasanian general of Daylamite origin, first mentioned in the prelude to the Iberian War and then during the Aksumite–Persian wars.

== Name ==
He was born Boe (Middle Persian: Bōē, Persian: بویه Bōyah/Būyeh), which is Hellenized as Boes.

He is better known by his title of Wahrīz (Middle Persian: wḥlyč; in Arabic: بهريز Bahrīz; in Greek: Οὐαριζης Ouarizes, in Latin: Vaphrizes; Modern Persian: وهرز).

== Biography ==
Wahrez is first mentioned in the prelude to the Iberian War, where he was sent by the Sasanian king (shah) Kavadh I (r. 498–531) to Caucasian Iberia in order to subdue a revolt under Vakhtang I of Iberia.

During the reign of Kavadh's son, Khosrau I, the Yemenites had requested assistance against Axum dominance, who had occupied their country. Sayf ibn Dhi-Yazan, the son of Dhu Yazan, went to Khosrau and offered him all of Yemen if his army would defeat the Axumites.

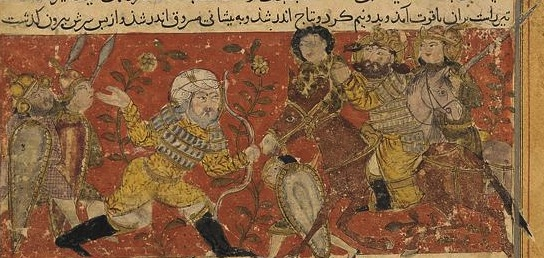
"The arrow of old Wahraz kills Masruq, the Ethiopian King of Yemen", Persian miniature from Tarikh-i Bal'ami

Khosrau then sent Wahrez and his son Nawzadh to Yemen at the head of a small expeditionary force, numbering around 800, of low-ranking Azatan (Azadan) nobility. According to other traditions, it consisted of prisoners that were sentenced to death, while according to another version, the force also included (or entirely consisted of) warriors from Daylam and nearby regions. Only two out of eight ships (i.e. 600 men) safely reached the Yemeni coast, who joined the local Himyarite allies and engaged the combined forces of the Aksumites, their Himyarite allies, and certain "Bedouins". During the fighting, Nawzadh was killed, which made Wahrez furious at Masruq ibn Abraha, the Axumite ruler of Yemen. Wahrez then met Masruq in battle and killed him with an arrow, which made the Axumites flee. He then conquered Sanaa, where he is known to have refused to lower his banner to enter via the city gate. Wahrez then restored Sayf ibn Dhi-Yazan to his throne as a vassal of the Sasanian Empire.

Al-Tabari reports that the main reason behind victory of Wahrez over the Axumites was the use of the panjagān (meaning "having five (arrows?) and probably a ballista equipped with heavy darts), a piece of military technology with which the local peoples were utterly unfamiliar.

After having conquered Yemen, Wahrez then returned to Persia with a great amount of booty. However, in AD 575 or 578, the vassal king was killed by the Ethiopians, which forced Wahrez to return to Yemen with a force of 4000 men, and expel the Axumites once again. He then made Maʿdī Karib, the son of Sayf, the new king of Yemen. Wahrez was then appointed as governor of Yemen by Khosrau I, which would remain in Sasanian hands until the arrival of Islam. Wahrez was succeeded by his son Marzubān as governor of Yemen.

== Sources ==
- Zakeri, Mohsen (1995). Sasanid Soldiers in Early Muslim Society: The Origins of 'Ayyārān and Futuwwa. Otto Harrassowitz Verlag. pp. 1–391. ISBN 3447036524.
- Bosworth, C. E. (1983). "Abnāʾ". Encyclopaedia Iranica, Vol. I, Fasc. 3. pp. 226–228.
- Potts, Daniel T. (2012). "ARABIA ii. The Sasanians and Arabia". Encyclopaedia Iranica.
- Wilferd Madelung, Wolfgang Felix (1995). "DEYLAMITES". Encyclopaedia Iranica, Vol. BII, Fasc. 4. pp. 342–347.
