= Theophanes of Byzantium =

Byzantine historian

Theophanes of Byzantium (Greek: Θεόφανης ὁ Βυζάντιος; fl. 6th century) was a Byzantine historian.

He wrote, in ten books, the history of the Eastern Empire during the Persian war under Justin II, beginning from the second year of Justin (567), in which the truce made by Justinian I with Khosrau I was broken, and going down to the last year of the war. The work has not survived, but Patriarch Photius gives an account of the work of Theophanes, and he repeats the author's statement that, besides adding other books to the ten which formed the original work, he had written another work on the history of Justinian. Among the historical statements preserved by Photius from Theophanes is the discovery, in the reign of Justinian, of the fact that silk was the product of a worm, which had not been before known to the people of the Roman Empire. A certain Persian, he tells us, coming from the land of the Seres, brought to Constantinople "the seed" (i.e. the eggs) of the silk-worm, and these "seeds" being hatched in the spring, and the worms fed with mulberry leaves, they spun their silk, and went through their transformations.
