= Dhu Nuwas =

Himyarite King of Yemen (AD 517–530)

- King of Himyar
- Reign: AD 522–530
- Predecessor: Ma'dikarib Ya'fur or Dhu Shanatir (in Arabian folklore)
- Successor: Sumyafa Ashwa
- Born: c. AD 450; Himyar
- Died: AD 530; Red Sea
- Religion: Judaism

Dhū Nuwās (Arabic: ذُو نُوَاس), real name Yūsuf Asʾar Yathʾar (Musnad: 𐩺𐩥𐩪𐩰 𐩱𐩪𐩱𐩧 𐩺𐩻𐩱𐩧, Yws¹f ʾs¹ʾr Yṯʾr), Yosef Nu'as (Hebrew: יוסף נואס), or Yūsuf bin Sharhabil (Arabic: يُوْسُف ٱبْن شَرْحَبِيْل), also known as Masruq in Syriac, and Dounaas (Δουναας) in Medieval Greek, was a Jewish king of Himyar reigning between AD 522–530 who became infamous for his persecution of Christians living in his kingdom. He was also known as Zur'ah in the Arab traditions.

== Names and family ==
Dhu Nuwas' family is not very well known. There is debate on who his father is; the earlier Arab scholars and the Jewish Encyclopedia believed that Dhu Nuwas was the son of the earlier Himyarite king Abu Karib. However, Ibn al-Kalbi disagreed and stated that he was the son of Sharhabil Yakkuf, hence making him the great-grandson of Abu Karib. Ibn Abbas also reported that Dhu Nuwas' real name was Yusuf, son of Sharhabil, which was reported by Ibn al-Kalbi and Al-Baydawi and later on the historian Ibn al-Athir. His mother, however, was said to have been a Jewish slave from Nisibis who was purchased by and then married to an unnamed Himyarite king; this indicates Dhu Nuwas was in fact a Himyarite prince. (Note: Irfan Shahid, in the Introduction to his book, Martyrs of Najran (published in 1971), quotes from the Nestorian Chronicle from Saard (Séert) edited by Addai Scher (see: Patrologia Orientalis vol. IV, V and VII), compiled shortly after 1036 from extracts of old Syriac historical works no longer extant, saying: "… In later times there reigned over this country a Jewish king, whose name was Masrūq. His mother was a Jewess, of the inhabitants of Nisibis, who had been made a captive. Then one of the kings of Yaman had bought her and she had given birth to Masrūq and instructed him in Judaism. He reigned after his father and killed a number of the Christians. Bar Sāhde has told his history in his Chronicle.") If so, that would place her origins within the Sassanid imperial sphere and would illuminate possible political reasons for his later actions against the Christians of Arabia, who were natural allies of the Byzantine Empire.

As for the real name of Dhu Nuwas, the archaeological inscriptions already prove his real name to have been Yusuf As'ar Yath'ar. The Arab historians with the exception of Ibn Abbas all cite his real name as being Zur'ah while the name Yusuf comes later after his conversion to Judaism. Some sources also state his name was Masruq. Either way, it is agreed upon that Dhu Nuwas had the name Yusuf during his rule.

== Aksumite invasion ==
Ibn Hisham's Sīrah (better known in English as the Life of Muhammad), describes the exploits of Yūsuf Dhū Nuwās. Ibn Hisham explains that Yūsuf converted to judaism and then grew out his sidelocks (nuwās), becoming known as "he of sidelocks." According to the Arab traditions, he took power after having killed his supposed predecessor, Dhu Shanatir, with a knife hidden in his shoe. The historicity of Dhū Nuwās is affirmed by Philostorgius and by Procopius (in the latter's Persian War). Procopius writes that in 525, the armies of the Christian Kingdom of Aksum of Ethiopia invaded ancient Yemen at the request of the Byzantine emperor Justin I to take control of the Himyarite Kingdom, then under the leadership of Yūsuf Dhū Nuwās, who rose to power in 522, probably after he assassinated Dhu Shanatir.

Ibn Hisham explains the same sequence of events under the name of "Yūsuf Dhū Nuwās." Following this invasion, the supremacy of Judaism in the Kingdom of Ḥimyar, as well as in all of Yemen, came to an abrupt end. Imrū' al-Qays, the famous Yemeni poet from the same period, in his poem Taqūl Lī bint al-Kinda Lammā ‘Azafat, laments the death of two great men of Yemen, one of them being Dhū Nuwās, and regards him as the last of the Himyarite kings:

Art thou not saddened how fate has become an ugly beast,
the betrayer of its generation, he that swalloweth up people? It has removed Dhū Nuwās from the fortresses
who once ruled in the strongholds and over men
(Note: The entire poem is brought down only in a-Ṭūsī's version of the dīwān (concerning which, see the words of the editors of Imrū al-Qays, Dīwān imrī al-qays wa-mulḥaqātuh bi-šarḥ abī sa‘īd al-sukkarī, ed. Abū Suwaylim & al-Šawābika, Muḥammad, UAE 2000, p. 105–110), while the two stanzas which are shown here in brackets have been taken from al-‘Iqd al-ṯamīn (ibid., p. 714, n. 1). The two stanzas have also been included in an abridged version of the poem, Imrū al-Qays, Dīwān imrī al-qays, Ed. al-Ayyūbī, Yāsīn, Beirut 1998, p. 472–473.)

One Syriac source appears to suggest that the mother of Dhū Nuwās may have been a Jew hailing from the Mesopotamian city of Nisibis. (Note: Irfan Shahid, in the Introduction to his book, Martyrs of Najran (published in 1971), quotes from the Nestorian Chronicle from Saard (Séert) edited by Addai Scher (see: Patrologia Orientalis vol. IV, V and VII), compiled shortly after 1036 from extracts of old Syriac historical works no longer extant, saying: "… In later times there reigned over this country a Jewish king, whose name was Masrūq. His mother was a Jewess, of the inhabitants of Nisibis, who had been made a captive. Then one of the kings of Yaman had bought her and she had given birth to Masrūq and instructed him in Judaism. He reigned after his father and killed a number of the Christians. Bar Sāhde has told his history in his Chronicle.") If so, that would place her origins within the Sassanid imperial sphere and would illuminate possible political reasons for his later actions against the Christians of Arabia, who were natural allies of the Byzantine Empire.

Many modern historians, except for Christopher Haas, have argued that her son's conversion was a matter of tactical opportunism since Judaism would have provided him with an ideological counterweight to the religion of his adversary, the Kingdom of Aksum and it also allowed him to curry favour with the Sasanian emperor.

== Persecution of Christians ==
Based on other contemporary sources, Dhu Nuwas, after seizing the throne of the Ḥimyarites around 518 or 522, attacked Najran and its christians inhabitants, captured them and, burned their churches. The destruction fell out on Tuesday, during the 15th day of the lunar month Tishri, in the year 835 of the Seleucid era counting, corresponding with AD 524. After accepting the city's capitulation, he massacred its inhabitants who would not renounce Christianity. Earlier, the Himyarite monarch had attacked and killed the Abyssinian Christians who had settled in Zafar.

The Quran also mentions the persecution of Christians by Dhu Nuwas without mentioning his name in 85:4.

"Woe to the makers of the pit,Fire supplied (abundantly) with fuel:Behold! they sat over against the (fire),And they witnessed (all) that they were doing against the Believers.And they ill-treated them for no other reason than that they believed in Allah, Exalted in Power, Worthy of all Praise"^{[Quran 85:4–9]}

According to the Arab historians, Dhu Nuwas then proceeded to write a letter to the Lakhmid king Al-Mundhir III ibn al-Nu'man of al-Ḥīrah and King Kavadh I of Persia to inform them of his decisions and to encourage them to do likewise to the Christians under their dominion. Al-Mundhir received the letter in January 519 [sic], as he was receiving an embassy from Constantinople seeking to forge a peace between the Roman Empire and al-Ḥīrha. He revealed the contents of the letter to the Byzantine ambassadors, who were horrified by its contents. Word of the slaughter quickly spread throughout the Byzantine and Persian realms, and refugees from Najran, including a man named Daws Dhu Tha'laban, even reached the court of Roman Emperor Justin I himself and begged him to avenge the martyred Christians.

In AD 523, Dhu Nawas murdered Arethas, the leader of the Miaphysite Christian community, along with 340 of his followers. News of this reached the ears of emperor Justin I of the Byzantine Empire and King Kaleb of Axum, the latter of which sent troops to depose Dhu Nawas and end the persecution of Christians.

== Military campaigns ==
The name Yūsuf 'As'ar Yath'ar, which is believed to mean the same as Yūsūf Dhū Nuwās, appears in an old South Arabian inscription from the 520s. Related inscriptions from the same period were also deciphered by Jamme and Ryckmans and show that in the ensuing wars with his non-Jewish subjects, the combined war booty (excluding deaths) from campaigns waged against the Abyssinians in Zafar, the fighters in ’Ašʻarān, Rakbān, Farasān, Muḥwān (Mokha), and the fighters and military units in Najran, amounted to 12,500 war trophies, 11,000 captives and 290,000 camels and bovines and sheep.

According to 'Irfan Shahid's Martyrs of Najran – New Documents, Dhu Nuwas sent an army of some 120,000 soldiers to lay siege to the city of Najran, which siege lasted for six months, and the city taken and burnt on the 15th day of the seventh month (the lunar month of Tishri). The city had revolted against the king and refused to deliver itself to the king. About 300 of the city's inhabitants surrendered to the king's forces under the assurances of an oath that no harm would come to them, and they were later bound. Those remaining in the city were burnt alive within their church. The death toll in that account is said to have reached about 2000. However, the Sabaean inscriptions describing the events report that by the month of Dhu-Madra'an (between July and September), there had been "1000 killed, 1500 prisoners [taken] and 10,000 head of cattle."

Jacques Ryckmans, who deciphered the Sabaean inscriptions, writes in his La persécution des chrétiens himyarites that Sarah'il Yaqbul-Yaz'an of the Dhu Yazan family was both the tribal chief and the lieutenant of King Yusuf during the military campaigns; he was sent out by the king to take the city of Najran, and the king watched for a possible Aksumite incursion along the coastal plains of Yemen near Mokha (al-Moḫâ) and the strait known as Bāb al-Mandab. The Ethiopian church in Zafar, which had been built by the Himyarite King some years earlier after the proselytizing mission of Theophilos the Indian and another church built by him in Aden (see: Ecclesiastical History of Philostorgius, Epitome of Book III, chapter 4), had been seen by Constantius II during the embassage to the land of the Ḥimyarites (Yemen) around AD 340. This church was set on fire and razed to the ground, and its Abyssinian inhabitants killed. Later, foreigners (presumably Christians) living in Hadhramaut were also put to death before the king's army advanced to Najran in the far north and took it.

King Yusuf As'ar Yath'ar, described in an inscription as the "king of all nations," led the major tribes of Yemen (Hamdan, Madhhij, Kinda, Murad) and successfully defeated the Abyssinian forces in Zafar, Mokha and Najran.

== Death ==
According to Ibn Ishaq, Dhu Nuwas chose to commit suicide by drowning in the sea, after the Aksumites had invaded Yemen as a retaliation for his persecutions of Christians. Unwilling to accept defeat after the capture of his queen and bounty along with the town of Zafar, he deliberately rode his horse into the Red Sea.

== Inscriptions regarding Dhu Nuwas ==
Najran inscription (AD 518):

Hima inscription near Najran

The first line :
Sabaean: ليبركن الن ذ لهو سمين وارضين ملكن يوسف اسار يثار ملك كل اشعبن وليبركن اقولن
Arabic: ليبارك الله الذي له (ملك) السماوات والأرض الملك يوسف أسار يثأر ملك كل الشعوب وليبارك الأقيال

God who owns the heavens and the earth bless king Yusuf Asar Yathar, king of all nations and bless the Aqials

Third line:
Sabaean: خصرو مراهمو ملكن ذو نواس الدقراري يوسف اسار يثار كدهر قلسن وهرج احبشن بظفر وعلي حرب اشعرن وركبن وفرسن
Arabic: الذين ناصروا سيدهم الملك يوسف أسأر يثأر عندما أحرق الكنيسة وقتل الأحباش في ظفار وعلى حرب الأشاعرة وركبان وفرسان

Who they stand with their master, King Yusuf Asar Yathar, when he burned the church and killed the Abyssinians Dhofar and war on (Habashah) in Ash'aran and Rakban (regions) and Farasan

Fifth line:
Sabaean: وكذه فلح لهفان ملكن بهيت سباتن خمس ماتو عثني عشر االفم مهرجتم واحد عشر االفم سبيم وتسعي
Arabic: وقد أفلح الملك في هذه المعركة في قتل 12500 اثناعشر الف وخمسمائة قتيل و11090 أحد عشر ألف وتسعين اسير

The king has succeeded in these battles in the killing of 12,500 and capturing 11,090

Sixth line:
Sabaean: وثتي ماتن االفن ابلم وبقرم وضانم وتسطرو ذن مسندن قيل شرحال ذي يزن اقرن بعلي نجرن
Arabic: وغنم مئتي الف رأس من الابل والبقر والضان وقد كتب هذه المسند القيل شرحال ذي يزن عندما رابط في نجران

Booty of two hundred thousand camels, cows, sheep, and this inscription was written by Sharaḥ'īl Yaqbul dhu Yaz'an when camped in Najran

Seventh line:
Sabaean: بشعب ذ همدن هجرن وعربن ونقرم بن ازانن واعرب كدت ومردم ومذحجم واقولن اخوتهو بعم ملكن قرنم
Arabic: مع شعب همدان والعرب والمقاتلين اليزنيين وأعراب كندة ومراد ومذحج واخوته الأقيال الذين رابطوا مع الملك

With the nation of Hamdan and the Arabs and the Yazaniin fighters and the A'rab ('nomads') of Kinda and Murad and Madhhij and his brothers the Aqials who camped with the king

Eighth and ninth lines:
Sabaean: ببحرن بن حبشت ويصنعنن سسلت مدبن وككل ذذكرو بذل مسندن مهرجتم وغنمم ومقرنتم فكسباتم
Arabic: على البحر من جهة الحبشة واقاموا سلسلة من التحصينات في باب المندب وجميع الذين ذكروا بهذا المسند قاتلوا وغنموا ورابطوا في هذه المهمة

On the sea from the side of Habashah (Abyssinia) And they set up a series of fortifications in the Bab al-Mandab and all who mentioned in this Musnad they fought and took booty and camped in this mission

Sabaean: اوده ذ قفلو ابتهمو بثلثت عشر اورخم وليبركن رحمنن بنيهمو شرحبال يكمل وهعن اسار بني لحيعت
Arabic: وعادوا في تاريخ ثلاثة عشر وليبارك الرحمن ابناء شرحبال يكمل وهعن واسار بني لحيعت

And they returned in the history of thirteen and Rahman (god) bless Sharhabil Akmal and Wh'an and Asar Bni Lhi't
