= Tarikhnama =

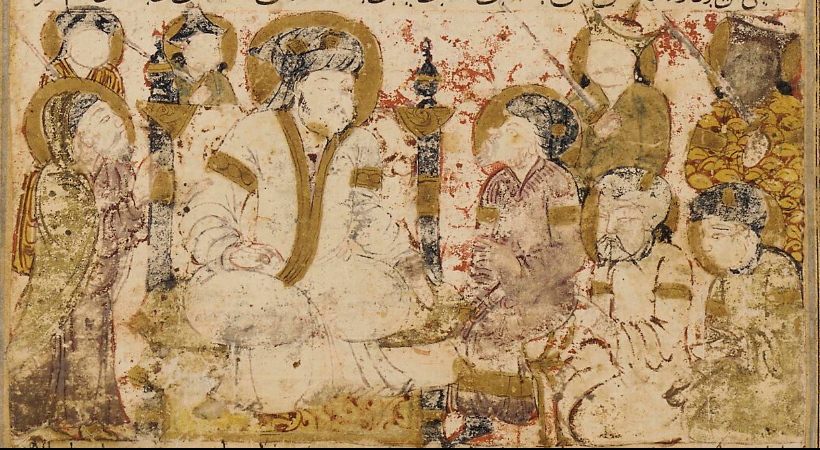
Folio from the Tarikhnama of Bal'ami (early 14th century copy), depicting al-Saffah (r. 750–754) as he receives pledges of allegiance in Kufa

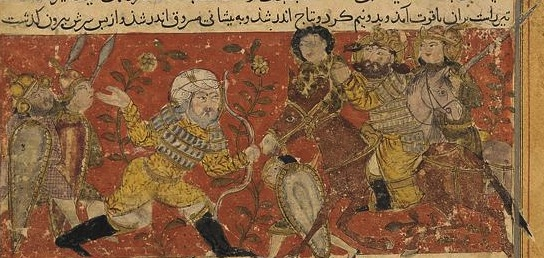
The arrow of old Wahraz kills Masruq, the King of Yemen in Persian miniature.

Tarikh-i Bal'ami (Persian: تاریخ بلعمی, romanized: History of Bal'ami) or Tārīkhnāma-yi Bozorg (تاریخنامه بزرگ, 'The Great Book of History') is the earliest known extant prose book in New Persian written by Muhammad Bal'ami, a vizier in Samanid service. The 10th-century text is a universal history, spanning a period beginning with the dawn of creation through to the Islamic age. Having been translated into Turkish and Arabic, the book remained in circulation for a thousand years, and it is among the most influential books of Islamic historical literature. While the author claims the book is a Persian translation of al-Tabari's History of the Prophets and Kings, it is actually an independent work.

The literary style deviates from that of earlier Parthian language and Middle Persian works composed in the Sasanian Empire. The Tarikhnama is considered the starting point of an influential Persian historiographical tradition that makes use of Arabic loanwords, and is based more on Arabic (and Islamic) models than earlier Sasanian ones. It helped revive both the idea of the Iranian monarchy and its memory.

Bal'ami started translating the book on 352 AH (963 CE).

Various manuscripts of this book are today available in the libraries of Iran, India, Turkey and Europe. The oldest surviving manuscript seems to be from 7th century AH (13th century CE).

The book was translated into Persian language at the order of Mansur ibn Nuh, the Samanid amir. The book provides invaluable information about the Sasanian Persia and mythical history of Iran. Generally considered merely an abridged version of Tabari's work, A. C. S. Peacock demonstrated that Balami reshaped Tabari's work considerably, and that the differences between the two works are such that the Tārīkhnāma is essentially a new work.

== See also ==
- Shahnameh

== Sources ==
- Arjomand, Saïd Amir (2025). Persianate Historical Sociology: Collected Essays. Brill. ISBN 978-9004742529.

== Sources ==
- Peacock, A. C. S. (2007). Mediaeval Islamic Historiography and Political Legitimacy: Balʿamī's Tārīkhnāma. London and New York: Routledge. ISBN 978-0-415-40025-1.
