= Constitution of Medina =

Proclamation by Muhammad to end intertribal fighting

ميثاق المدينة (Mithaq al-Madina)
- Type: Constitution, Agreement, Social contract
- Signed: 622 CE
- Signatories: Various tribes and groups in Medina
- Parties: Chief Magistrate / Author: Muhammad; Muslims of Medina: Muhajirun (migrants from Mecca); Ansar (helpers from Medina); Some Jewish tribes of Medina; Pagan Arabs of Medina; Various polytheistic tribes
- Language: Arabic

The Mithaq al-Madina or the Constitution of Medina or the Charter of Medina (Arabic: وثيقة المدينة, romanized: Waṯīqat al-Madīna; or صحیفة المدينة, Ṣaḥīfat al-Madīna; also known as the "Umma Document"), is a constitution that governed the affairs of Medina which formed the basis of the First Islamic state, a multi-religious polity under the Prophet Muhammad's leadership. Composed of approximately 47 clauses, the constitution established a legal, economic and political framework for the diverse communities living in Medina, declaring all citizens as one community, and has been called as the world's first constitution to establish pluralism, religious freedom, and collective defense.

According to Robert Bertram Serjeant, the Constitution of Medina consisted of eight distinct documents, issued on several occasions over the first seven years or so of Muhammad's Medinan period. Many of the texts were recorded by Ibn Ishaq and Abu 'Ubayd al-Qasim ibn Sallam, though how they encountered the text is unclear. Although it does not fulfill any of the conditions of authenticity in the Islamic recording system (such as having a reliable chain of narrators up to the person who recorded it), it is widely accepted as authentic. It may have been preserved due to interest in its manner of administration. Many tribal groups are mentioned, including the Banu Najjar and Quraysh, as well as many tribal institutions, like vengeance, blood money, ransom, alliance, and clientage, and has striking resemblances with Surah 5 (Al-Ma'idah) of the Quran.

== Historical sources ==
The Constitution is only known from excerpts in early Muslim sources, primarily the Al-Sīrah Al-Nabawiyyah of Ibn Hisham (early 800s CE), a recension of the Al-Sīrah Al-Nabawiyyah of Ibn Ishaq, though transmitted without a chain of narration, a crucial criterion for hadith scholars. Other important sources for the Constitution includes those of Sayyid al-Nas and the Kitab al-Amwal of Abu 'Ubayd al-Qasim ibn Sallam.

According to L. Ali Khan, scholars do not agree on whether the constitution was a single document or "a compilation of multiple agreements reached at different times". According to mid-20th century scholar, Robert Bertram Serjeant, the 'Constitution of Medina' consists of "eight distinct documents ... issued on various occasions over the first seven years or so of Muhammad's Medinan period". In its first recension, Serjeant hypothesizes that the text sanctioned the establishment of a confederation; in its second, it admonished the Aws and Khazraj to abide by their treaty; in its third, in conjunction with the proceeding verses, it encouraged of Muhammad's adherents to face the Meccan forces they eventually fought at Uhud. He also suggests that 3:101–104 of the Qur'an may refer to the constitution.

== Genre and authenticity ==
The Constitution has been highly influential among contemporary Muslims, celebrated for its religious pluralism, unique character and the first "Constitution" and belief that God is its ultimate source. (Note: "In comparison to our constitution it is obvious that the constitution of Nabi SAW is superior because it is a constitution based on divinity, i.e. Qur’an and Hadith. There is no comparison.") On the other hand, historians have variously characterized it as a "municipal charter” (Gemeindeordnung); or as a "unilateral proclamation" by Muhammad, whose "purpose was purely practical and administrative", rather than a treaty in the modern sense. (Note: "The document is not a treaty in the European sense, but rather a unilateral proclamation, its purpose was purely practical and administrative and reveals the cautious, cartful character of the Prophet.")

Most historians have accepted the authenticity of the Constitution of Medina. (Note: though "the most skeptical of contemporary 'source-critical' scholars", (Patricia Crone), has endorsed the text's antiquity, saying that in the Sira of Ibn Ishaq, “it sticks out like a piece of solid rock in an accumulation of rubble.”) This is based on its inclusion of non-Muslims and its portrayal of the Quraysh as enemies of God, a view inconsistent with later Islamic periods. Other factors include the perceived archaic style of the text, its abundance of unexplained allusions that were considered to be likely understood only by contemporaries, and its apparent inclination towards tribal law over developed Islamic norms.

At least a few remain skeptical however, and some think that the Constitution existed but its wording or content is no longer accessible. In the case of some historians, skepticism is constrained to particular aspects of the Constitution as well as the context of its emergence; disagreements persist on whether the documents resulted from negotiated settlements or were merely unilateral edicts by Muhammad, the identity of participants (including uncertainty about the inclusion of the three major Jewish tribes of Medina—Banu Qaynuqa, Banu Nadir, and Banu Qurayza), the quantity of documents, the precise timing of its creation (or that of its constituent parts), and the appropriate approach to its translation, among other issues.

== Dating ==
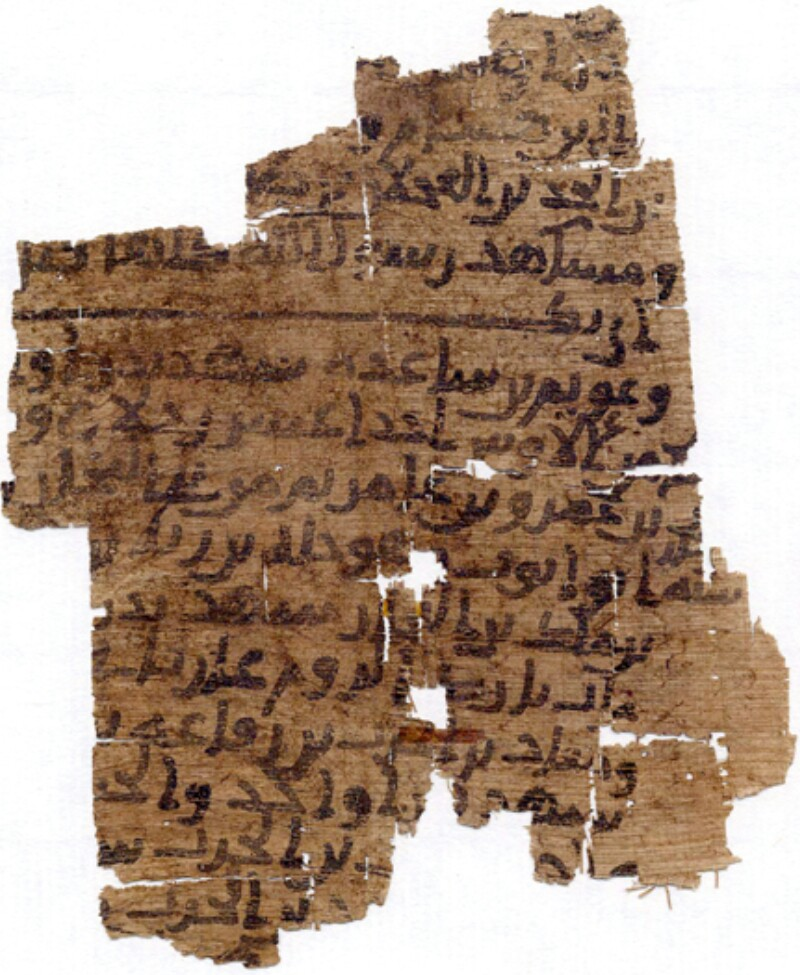
An early manuscript of Ibn Hisham's al-Sirah al-Nabawiyyah

One 20th-century scholar, W. Montgomery Watt, suggested that the Constitution of Medina must have been written in the early Medinan period (i.e., in 622 CE or shortly thereafter), because if the document had been drafted any later, then it would have both had a positive attitude towards the Quraysh and given Muhammad a more prominent place. Malay scholars, Fadzilah Din and Mohamed Noh Abdul Jalil, as well as the noted Pakistani scholar, Muhammad Tahir-ul-Qadri, cite the 622 CE drafting. Others, such as Hubert Grimme, suggested that it must have been drafted after the 624 CE Battle of Badr. Still others, such as Leone Caetani, suggested that the document was written before that battle.

Portions of the constitution are corroborated by multiple sound hadith reports. Its validity in its stated single form, however, has been called into question, as there is no single sound chain of authorities (isnad) supporting it. There are differences of opinion as well as to how many documents the constitution comprises—from one to eight. It is also unclear with which Jews this agreement was made, whether it was only with some of the smaller Jewish social units that had lost their tribal structure and affiliated with the Arabs, with the Judaized Arabs, or also included what later sources described as the three major Jewish clans in the city, namely Banu Qaynuqa, Banu Nadir, and Banu Qurayza, (who are not mentioned in the agreement).

This constitution gave the Islamic prophet Muhammad, who had just escaped persecution in Mecca, a leading role in the community of Medina. By dating this treaty at the outset of his arrival, it credited Muhammad with honor and power earlier than he would later gain, but more importantly, it gives the justification for Muhammad's subsequent attacks on the Jews as retaliation for their opposition to him. Another question raised about the constitution is that though it gives a list of Jewish tribes/clans of Medina involved, not among them are three famous in traditional Islamic history for being driven into exile (the Banu Qaynuqa and Banu Nadir tribes) or "massacred and dumped into pits" (the Banu Qurayza tribe), after conspiring and rising up against Muhammad. There is a suggestion, however, that if this constitution really existed, it was probably created after the elimination of the three major Jewish clans in Medina by Muhammad and his troops. (see Also:Jewish tribes of Arabia)

== Background ==
According to traditional Islamic belief, in Muhammad's last years in Mecca, a delegation from Medina from its twelve important clans invited him as a neutral outsider to serve as the chief arbitrator for the entire community. There had been fighting in Medina involving mainly its pagan and Jewish inhabitants for around 100 years before 620. The recurring slaughters and disagreements over the resulting claims, especially after the Battle of Bu'ath in which all the clans had been involved, made it obvious to them that the tribal conceptions of blood feud and an eye for an eye were no longer workable unless there was one man with the authority to adjudicate in disputed cases. The delegation from Medina pledged themselves and their fellow citizens to accept Muhammad into their community and to protect him physically as if he was one of them.

After emigration to Medina, Muhammad drafted the constitution, "establishing a kind of alliance or federation" of the eight Medinan tribes and Muslim emigrants from Mecca and specifying the rights and duties of all citizens and the relationship of the different communities in Medina, including that of the Muslim community to other communities: the Jews and the other "Peoples of the Book". According to chroniclers such as Ibn Sa'd al-Baghdadi (785-845 CE), the composition of the population of Medina at that time consisted of two supergroup local Arab tribes, the Aus and the Khazraj, with eight clans and 33 other smaller groups under them. Meanwhile, the Jewish tribes at least consisted of around 20 groups, with the most well-known tribes Qaynuqa, Nadhir, and Qurayza among them, (who are not mentioned in the agreement). The constitution also appointed Muhammad as the Chief Magistrate, making him as the foremost judicial authority responsible for resolving conflicts and overseeing judicial welfare in Medina. This later unified the diverse tribal groups, including the Jewish tribes, and ended long standing internecine tensions. In this role, prophet Muhammad exercised final decision making in dispute resolution, interpretation of law, and maintenance of public order.

== Text ==
The following English translation is that of the Israeli writer Michael Lecker from 2004. It is based on the version of the document found in Ibn Hisham's recension of the Seerah of Ibn Ishaq, Abu Ubaid's Kitab-al-Amwal, and Ibn Kathir's al-Bidaya wa l-Nihaya. The translation was aimed at being clear, with clauses numbered in line with international standards for ease of future reference. There is general agreement on the authenticity of the text.

1. This is a prescript of Muhammad, the Prophet and Messenger of God (to operate) between the faithful and the followers of Islam ("Muslims") from among the Quraish and the people of Madina and those who may be under them, may join them and take part in wars in their company.
2. They shall constitute a separate political unit ("Ummah") as distinguished from all the people (of the world).
3. The emigrants from the Quraish shall be (responsible) for their own ward; and shall pay their blood money in mutual collaboration and shall secure the release of their own prisoners by paying their ransom from themselves so that the mutual dealings between the believers be in accordance with the principles of goodness and justice.
4. And Banu ‘Awf shall be responsible for their own ward and shall pay their blood money in mutual collaboration, and every group shall secure the release of its own prisoners by paying their ransom from themselves so that the dealings between the believers be in accordance with the principles of goodness and justice.
5. And Banu Al-Harith-ibn-Khazraj shall be responsible for their own ward and shall pay their blood-money in mutual collaboration and every group shall secure the release of its own prisoners by paying their ransom from themselves, so that the dealings between the believers be in accordance with the principles of goodness and justice.
6. And Banu Sa‘ida shall be responsible for their own ward, and shall pay their blood-money in mutual collaboration and every group shall secure the release of its own prisoners by paying their ransom from themselves, so that the dealings between the believers be in accordance with the principles of goodness and justice.
7. And Banu Jusham shall be responsible for their own ward and shall pay their blood-money in mutual collaboration and every group shall secure the release of its own prisoners by paying their ransom so that the dealings between the believers be in accordance with the principles of goodness and justice.
8. And Banu an-Najjar shall be responsible for their own ward and shall pay their blood-money in mutual collaboration and every group shall secure the release of its own prisoners by paying their ransom so that the dealings between the believers be in accordance with the principles of goodness and justice.
9. And Banu ‘Amr-ibn-‘Awf shall be responsible for their own ward and shall pay their blood-money in mutual collaboration and every group shall secure the release of its own prisoners by paying their ransom, so that the dealings between the believers be in accordance with the principles of goodness and justice.
10. And Banu-al-Nabit shall be responsible for their own ward and shall pay their blood-money in mutual collaboration and every group shall secure the release of its own prisoners by paying their ransom so that the dealings between the believers be in accordance with the principles of goodness and justice.
11. And Banu-al-Aws shall be responsible for their own ward and shall pay their blood-money in mutual collaboration and every group shall secure the release of its own prisoners by paying their ransom, so that the dealings between the believers be in accordance with the principles of goodness and justice.
  1. And the believers shall not leave any one, hard-pressed with debts, without affording him some relief, in order that the dealings between the believers be in accordance with the principles of goodness and justice.
  2. Also no believer shall enter into a contract of clientage with one who is already in such a contract with another believer.
12. And the hands of pious believers shall be raised against every such person as rises in rebellion or attempts to acquire anything by force or is guilty of any sin or excess or attempts to spread mischief among the believers; their hands shall be raised all together against such a person, even if he be a son to any one of them.
13. A Believer will not kill a Believer [in retaliation] for a non-Believer and will not aid a non-Believer against a Believer.
14. The protection (dhimmah) of Allah is one, the least of them [i.e., the Believers] is entitled to grant protection (yujīr) that is binding for all of them. The Believers are each other's allies (mawālī) to the exclusion of other people.
15. And that those who will follow us among the Jews, will have help and equality. Neither shall they be oppressed nor will any help be given against them.
16. And the peace of the believers shall be one. If there be any war in the way of God, no believer shall be under any peace (with the enemy) apart from other believers, unless it (this peace) be the same and equally binding on all.
17. And all those detachments that will fight on our side will be relieved by turns.
18. And the believers as a body shall take blood vengeance in the way of God.
  1. And undoubtedly pious believers are the best and in the rightest course.
  2. And that no associator (non-Muslim subject) shall give any protection to the life and property of a Quraishite, nor shall he come in the way of any believer in this matter.
19. And if any one intentionally murders a believer, and it is proved, he shall be killed in retaliation, unless the heir of the murdered person be satisfied with blood-money. And all believers shall actually stand for this ordinance and nothing else shall be proper for them to do.
20. And it shall not be lawful for any one, who has agreed to carry out the provisions laid down in this code and has affixed his faith in God and the Day of Judgment, to give help or protection to any murderer, and if he gives any help or protection to such a person, God‟s curse and wrath shall be on him on the Day of Resurrection, and no money or compensation shall be accepted from such a person.
21. And that whenever you differ about anything, refer it to God and to Muhammad
22. And the Jews shall share with the believers the expenses of war so long as they fight in conjunction,
23. And the Jews of Banu ‘Awf shall be considered as one community (Ummat) along with the believers—for the Jews their religion, and for the Muslims theirs, be one client or patron. But whoever does wrong or commits treachery brings evil only on himself and his household.
24. And the Jews of Banu-an-Najjar shall have the same rights as the Jews of Banu ‘Awf.
25. And the Jews of Banu-al-Harith shall have the same rights as the Jews of Banu ‘Awf.
26. And the Jews of Banu Sa‘ida shall have the same rights as the Jews of Banu ‘Awf
27. And the Jews of Banu Jusham shall have the same rights as the Jews of Banu ‘Awf.
28. And the Jews of Banu al-Aws shall have the same rights as the Jews of Banu ‘Awf.
29. And the Jews of Banu Tha‘laba shall have the same rights as the Jews of Banu ‘Awf. But whoever does wrong or commits treachery brings evil only on himself and his household.
30. And Jafna, who are a branch of the Tha’laba tribe, shall have the same rights as the mother tribes.
31. And Banu-ash-Shutaiba shall have the same rights as the Jews of Banu ‘Awf; and they shall be faithful to, and not violators of, treaty.
32. And the mawlas (clients) of Tha'laba shall have the same rights as those of the original members of it.
33. And the sub-branches of the Jewish tribes shall have the same rights as the mother tribes.
  1. And that none of them shall go out to fight as a soldier of the Muslim army, without the per-mission of Muhammad.
  2. And no obstruction shall be placed in the way of any one‟s retaliation for beating or injuries; and whoever sheds blood brings it upon himself and his household, except he who has been wronged, and Allah demands the most righteous fulfillment of this [treaty].
  1. And the Jews shall bear the burden of their expenses and the Muslims theirs.
  2. And if any one fights against the people of this code, their (i.e., of the Jews and Muslims) mutual help shall come into operation, and there shall be friendly counsel and sincere behaviour between them; and faithfulness and no breach of covenant.
34. And the Jews shall be bearing their own expenses so long as they shall be fighting in conjunction with the believers.
35. And the Valley of Yathrib (Madina) shall be a Haram (sacred place) for the people of this code.
36. The clients (mawla) shall have the same treatment as the original persons (i.e., persons accepting clientage). He shall neither be harmed nor shall he himself break the covenant.
37. And no refuge shall be given to any one without the permission of the people of the place (i.e., the refugee shall have no right of giving refuge to others).
38. And that if any murder or quarrel takes place among the people of this code, from which any trouble may be feared, it shall be referred to God and God's Messenger, Muhammad; and God will be with him who will be most particular about what is written in this code and act on it most faithfully.
39. The Quraish shall be given no protection nor shall they who help them.
40. And they (i.e., Jews and Muslims) shall have each other's help in the event of any force invading Yathrib.
  1. And if they (i.e., the Jews) are invited to any peace, they also shall offer peace and shall be a party to it; and if they invite the believers to some such affairs, it shall be their (Muslims) duty as well to reciprocate the dealings, excepting that any one makes a religious war.
  2. On every group shall rest the responsibility of (repulsing) the enemy from the place which faces its part of the city.
41. And the Jews of the tribe of al-Aws, clients as well as original members, shall have the same rights as the people of this code: and shall behave sincerely and faithfully towards the latter, not perpetrating any breach of covenant. As one shall sow so shall he reap. And God is with him who will most sincerely and faithfully carry out the provisions of this code.
42. And this prescript shall not be of any avail to any oppressor or breaker of covenant. And one shall have security whether one goes out to a campaign or remains in Madina, or else it will be an oppression and breach of covenant. And God is the Protector of him who performs the obligations with faithfulness and care, as also His Messenger Muhammad.

== Commentaries ==
=== Relationship with Jewish tribes ===
According to Jonathan Berkey, one of the constitution's more interesting aspects was the inclusion of the Jewish tribes in the ummah because although the Jewish tribes were "one community with the believers", they also "have their religion and the Muslims have theirs".

L. Ali Khan says that it was a social contract derived from a treaty and not from any fictional state of nature or from behind the Rawlsian veil of ignorance. It was built upon the concept of one community of diverse tribes living under the sovereignty of one God.

It also instituted peaceful methods of dispute resolution among diverse groups living as one people but without assimilating into one religion, language or culture. Welch in Encyclopedia of Islam states: "The constitution reveals Muhammad's great diplomatic skills, for it allows the ideal that he cherished of an ummah (community) based clearly on a religious outlook to sink temporarily into the background and is shaped essentially by practical considerations."

=== Relationship between Believers ===
Another important feature of the Constitution of Medina is the redefinition of ties between "Believers" (as they are described in the document). It sets faith relationships above blood-ties and emphasizes individual responsibility. Tribal identities are still important to refer to different groups, but the "main binding tie" for the newly created ummah is religion. That contrasts with the norms of pre-Islamic Arabia, which was a thoroughly tribal society, but Serjeant postulates the existence of earlier theocratic communities. According to Denny, "Watt has likened the Ummah as it is described in the document to a tribe, but with the important difference that it was to be based on religion and not on kinship". That is an important event in the development of the small group of Muslims in Medina to the larger Muslim community and empire.

== See also ==
- Early reforms under Islam
- Al-Risalah al-Huquq
- Ashtiname of Muhammad
- Islam and secularism
- List of expeditions of Muhammad
- Marrakesh Declaration
- Muhammad in Medina
- Pre-Islamic Arabic poetry
- Ummah
