= Al-Sira al-Nabawiyya (disambiguation) =

Al-sira al-nabawiyya is the genre of traditional biographies of Muhammad.

Al-Sira al-Nabawiyya may also refer to:

- Al-Sirah al-Nabawiyyah (Ibn Hisham)
- Al-Sirah al-Nabawiyyah (Ibn Ishaq)
- Siyer-i Nebi by Mustafa ibn Yusuf al-Darir
