= Al-Sirah al-Nabawiyyah (Ibn Ishaq) =

Biography of Muhammad by Ibn Hisham

- Arabic cover
- Author: Ibn Hisham (Al-Bakka'i' / Ibn Ishaq)
- Original title: السيرة النبوية
- Language: Arabic
- Subject: Prophetic biography
- Genre: Classic
- Publication place: Medina
- Media type: Hardcover
- ISBN: 9782745139825 Dar Al-Kotob al-Ilmiyah Arabic version

Sirat Rasul Allah (in English, The Life of the Prophet) is a biography of the Islamic prophet Muhammad by Ibn Ishaq. Ibn Hisham published a revised version of the book, under the title Al-Sirah al-Nabawiyyah. Ibn Ishaq's original work is lost and survives primarily in edited recensions by Ibn Hisham and in extracts preserved in the History of the Prophets and Kings by Muhammad ibn Jarir al-Tabari.

== Original version, survival ==
Ibn Isḥaq collected oral traditions about the life of the Islamic prophet Muhammad. These traditions, which he orally dictated to his pupils, are now known collectively as Sīrat Rasūl Allāh (Arabic: سيرة رسول الله "Life of the Messenger of God"). His work is entirely lost and survives only in the following sources:

- Two edited copies, or recensions, of his work by Ibn Hisham based on the work of al-Bakka'i survive. Al-Bakka'i's work has perished and only ibn Hisham's has survived, in copies. Two such copies exist, the latter of the two is more heavily edited. Ibn Hisham edited out of his work "things which it is disgraceful to discuss; matters which would distress certain people; and such reports as al-Bakka'i told me he could not accept as trustworthy."
- An edited copy, or recension, prepared by his student Salamah ibn Fadl al-Ansari survives only in the copious extracts to be found in the voluminous History of the Prophets and Kings by Muhammad ibn Jarir al-Tabari. (Note: Discussed here are Ibn Ishaq and his Sirah, the various recensions of it, Guillaume's translation, and Ibn Hisham.)
- Fragments of several other recensions. Guillaume lists them on p. xxx of his preface, but regards most of them as so fragmentary as to be of little worth.

According to Donner, the material in ibn Hisham and al-Tabari is "virtually the same". However, there is some material to be found in al-Tabari that was not preserved by ibn Hisham. For example, al-Tabari includes the controversial episode of the Satanic Verses, while ibn Hisham does not.

Following the publication of previously unknown fragments of ibn Isḥaq's traditions, recent scholarship suggests that ibn Isḥaq did not commit to writing any of the traditions now extant, but they were narrated orally to his transmitters. These new texts, found in accounts by Salama al-Ḥarranī and Yūnus ibn Bukayr, were hitherto unknown and contain versions different from those found in other works.

== Al-Sirah al-Nabawiyyah (Ibn Hisham) ==
The original text of the Sīrat Rasūl Allāh by Ibn Ishaq did not survive. Yet it was one of the earliest substantial biographies of Muhammad. However, much of the original text was copied over into a work of his own by Ibn Hisham (Basra; Fustat, died 833 AD, 218 AH). (Note: Dates and places, and discussions, re Ibn Ishaq and Ibn Hisham in Guillaume (1955), pp. xiii & xli.)

Ibn Hisham also "abbreviated, annotated, and sometimes altered" the text of Ibn Ishaq, according to Guillaume (1955), p. xvii. Interpolations made by Ibn Hisham are said to be recognizable and can be deleted, leaving as a remainder, a so-called "edited" version of Ibn Ishaq's original text (otherwise lost). In addition, Guillaume (1955), p. xxxi points out that Ibn Hisham's version omits various narratives in the text which were given by al-Tabari in his History. (Note: Al-Tabari (839–923) wrote his History in Arabic: Ta'rikh al-rusul wa'l-muluk (Eng: History of Prophets and Kings). A 39-volume translation was published by State University of New York (SUNY) as The History of al-Tabari; volumes six to nine concern the life of Muhammad.) In these passages al-Tabari expressly cites Ibn Ishaq as a source. (Note: See Original versions, survival above, esp. re Salamah ibn Fadl al-Ansari. Cf, Guillaume (1955), p. xvii.)

Thus can be reconstructed an 'improved' "edited" text, i.e., by distinguishing or removing Ibn Hisham's additions, and by adding from al-Tabari passages attributed to Ibn Ishaq. Yet the result's degree of approximation to Ibn Ishaq's original text can only be conjectured. Such a reconstruction is available, e.g., in Guillaume's translation. (Note: Ibn Hisham's 'narrative' additions and his comments are removed from the text and isolated in a separate section, while Ibn Hisham's philological additions are evidently omitted.) Here, Ibn Ishaq's introductory chapters describe pre-Islamic Arabia, before he then commences with the narratives surrounding the life of Muhammad (in Guillaume (1955), pp. 109–690).

== Translations ==
In 1864 the Heidelberg professor Gustav Weil published an annotated German translation in two volumes. Several decades later the Hungarian scholar Edward Rehatsek prepared an English translation, but it was not published until over a half-century later.

The best-known translation in a Western language is Alfred Guillaume's 1955 English translation, but some have questioned the reliability of this translation. In it Guillaume combined ibn Hisham and those materials in al-Tabari cited as ibn Isḥaq's whenever they differed or added to ibn Hisham, believing that in so doing he was restoring a lost work. The extracts from al-Tabari are clearly marked, although sometimes it is difficult to distinguish them from the main text (only a capital "T" is used).

== See also ==
- Prophetic biography
- List of biographies of Muhammad
- List of Islamic scholars
- List of Sunni books

== Sources ==
- Donner, Fred McGraw (1998). Narratives of Islamic origins: the beginnings of Islamic historical writing. Darwin Press. ISBN 978-0-87850-127-4.
- Guillaume, Alfred, ed. (1955). The Life of Muhammad: A Translation of Ishāq's Sīrat Rasūl Allāh. Oxford University Press.
- The history of al-Tabari. Vol. 6 - Muhammad at Mecca. Albany, N.Y.: State University of New York Press. 1988. ISBN 0-88706-707-7.
- The history of al-Tabari. Vol. 7 - The foundation of the community. Albany, N.Y.: State University of New York Press. 1987. ISBN 0-88706-345-4.
