= Sirat al-Halbiya =

Biography of Muhammad by Ali Ibn Burhan-ud-din al-Halabi

Sirat al-Halabiya
- Author: Ali ibn Burhan al-Din al-Halabi
- Original title: إنسان العيون في سيرة الأمين المأمون
- Language: Arabic
- Subject: Sīrah
- Genre: Islamic biography
- Media type: Print, Manuscript

Sirat al-Halabiya (Arabic: السيرة الحلبية) or the original name, Insan al-Aiyun Fi Siratil Aminil Ma'mun (Arabic: إنسان العيون في سيرة الأمين المأمون) is a classical Islamic biography of the Islamic prophet Muhammad, written by Ali ibn Burhan al-Din al-Halabi (also known as Nur ad-Din al-Halabi), a 16th-century CE Islamic scholar from Aleppo.

== Content ==
Sirat al-Halabiya covers the life of Muhammad from his birth to his death, detailing his ancestry, childhood, prophethood, the revelation of the Quran, his migration (Hijrah) to Medina, his battles, his social and political roles, his teachings, and his family life. The work is known for its detailed narratives, incorporating various traditions and reports from earlier sources. It also discusses miracles attributed to Muhammad. Like other Sirah works, it aims to provide a comprehensive model for Muslim life based on the example of Muhammad.

== Author ==
Ali bin Burhan al-Din al-Halabi al-Shafi’i (Arabic: علي بن برهان الدين الحلبي الشافعي; 975 AH/1567 AD–1044 AH/1635 AD) Abu al-Faraj Nour al-Din bin Burhan al-Din, a Muslim historian, writer, and scholar, originally from Aleppo, was born in Egypt and died there. He was one of the teachers of the Salihiyya Madrasa, and his death was on Saturday, the last day of Shaban in the hijri year of 1044, and he was buried in the Mujawarin cemetery.

== Influence and legacy ==
Sirat al-Halabiya has been widely studied and referenced throughout the Muslim world, particularly within Sunni Islamic scholarship. Its detailed accounts and comprehensive nature have made it a popular source for sermons, lectures, and scholarly writings on the life of Muhammad. It has also been translated into various languages.

== See also ==
- Sīrah
- List of biographies of Muhammad
- Qadi Iyad (author of The Book of Healing)
- Ibn Hisham (author of Al-Sirah al-Nabawiyyah)
