= Muhammad the World-Changer: An Intimate Portrait =

2021 biography of Muhammad

- Author: Mohamad Jebara
- Language: English
- Genre: Biography
- Publisher: St. Martin's Press
- Publication date: November 16, 2021
- Publication place: United States
- Media type: Print, Audiobook
- Pages: 352
- ISBN: 978-1250239648

Muhammad the World-Changer: An Intimate Portrait is a biography of Muhammad by Mohamad Jebara, which was released on November 16, 2021. It was published by St. Martin's Press.

Unlike many traditional Islamic biographies, it is not a hagiography.

== Themes ==
Muhammad the World-Changer: An Intimate Portrait meditates over several key themes, including Muhammad’s attitude towards slavery and women's rights.

=== Semitic root words ===
Muhammad the World-Changer: An Intimate Portrait has the author writing about Semitic root words. Arabic texts are traced back to their original Semitic root words, in reference to language and cultural expressions.

== Release ==
The book is available in digital, paperback, and hardcover formats and has been translated into six languages. There is also an audiobook edition, published by Penguin Random House.

== Reception ==
Muhammad the World-Changer: An Intimate Portrait received generally positive reviews from critics. Several critics pointed to the book's humanizing depiction. of Muhammad as balanced,

History Today published a review by Lawrence Rosen, "Most accounts of the Prophet, whether malignant or hagiographic, have been stilted and one-dimensional. Mohamad Jebara’s biography aims for somewhere between...For Westerners who read only one book on the Prophet, this version may very well alter their view of Muhammad. And if it were to be translated into the languages of the Islamic world and widely disseminated – if, in short, it were to become the popularly accepted version of the Prophet’s life and thought – it is possible that the written life of Muhammad, as he appears in Jebara’s book, might change the world once again."

The New York Times described the book as "an accessible biography of Muhammad...tracing his development from orphan to political leader and providing insights into his personal life and tastes".

== See also ==
- Prophetic biography
- List of biographies of Muhammad
- History of Islam
