= Halbi =

Halbi may refer to:

- Halba people, a tribal community of India
- Halbi language, an Indo-Aryan language
- Ali Ibn Burhan-ud-din Halbi, author of the Sirat al-Halbiya
