= List of biographies of Muhammad =

This is a chronological listing of biographies of the Islamic prophet, Muhammad, from the earliest traditional writers to modern times.

== Number of biographies ==
The literature is extensive: in the Urdu language alone, a scholar from Pakistan in 2024 came up with a bibliography of more than 10,000 titles counting multivolume works as a single book and without taking into account articles, short essays or unpublished manuscripts, with the author also precising that the literature in Arabic is even more important.

== Earliest biographers ==
The following is a list of the earliest known Hadith collectors who specialized in collecting Sīra and Maghāzī reports.

=== 1st century of Hijrah (622–719 CE) ===
- Sahl ibn Abī Ḥathma (d. in Mu'awiya's reign, i.e., 41–60 AH), was a young companion of Muhammad. Parts of his writings on Maghazi are preserved in the Ansāb of al-Baladhuri, the Ṭabaqāt of Ibn Sa'd, and the works of Ibn Jarir al-Tabari and al-Waqidi.
- Abdullah ibn Abbas (d. 78 AH), a companion of Muhammad, his traditions are found in various works of Hadith and Sīra.
- Saʿīd ibn Saʿd ibn ʿUbāda al-Khazrajī, another young companion, whose writings have survived in the Musnad of Ibn Hanbal and Abī ʿIwāna, and al-Tabari's Tārīkh.
- ʿUrwa ibn al-Zubayr (d. 713). He wrote letters replying to inquiries of the Umayyad caliphs, Abd al-Malik ibn Marwan and al-Walid I, involving questions about certain events that happened in the time of Muhammad. Since Abd al-Malik did not appreciate the maghāzī literature, these letters were not written in story form. According to Wim Raven, He is not known to have written any books on the subject. He was a grandson of Abu Bakr and the younger brother of Abdullah ibn al-Zubayr.
- Saʿīd ibn al-Musayyib al-Makhzūmī (d. 94 AH), a famous Tābiʿī and one of the teachers of Ibn Shihab al-Zuhri. His traditions are quoted in the Six major hadith collections, and in the Sīra works of Ibn Ishaq, Ibn Sayyid al-Nās, and others.
- Abū Fiḍāla ʿAbd Allāh ibn Kaʿb ibn Mālik al-Anṣārī (d. 97–AH), his traditions are mentioned by Ibn Ishaq and al-Tabari.
- Abān ibn Uthmān ibn Affān (d. 101–105–AH), the son of Uthman wrote a small booklet. His traditions are transmitted through Malik ibn Anas in his Muwaṭṭaʾ, the Ṭabaqāt of Ibn Sa'd, and in the histories of al-Tabari and al-Yaʿqūbī.
- ʿĀmir ibn Sharāḥīl al-Shaʿbī (d. 103 AH), his traditions were transmitted through Abu Isḥāq al-Subaiʿī, Saʿīd ibn Masrūq al-Thawrī, al-Aʿmash, Qatāda, Mujālid ibn Saʿīd, and others.
- Hammam ibn Munabbih (d. 101 AH/719 CE), author of the Sahifah and a student of Abu Hurayrah.

=== 2nd century of Hijrah (720–816 CE) ===
- Al-Qāsim ibn Muḥammad ibn Abī Bakr (d. 107 AH), another grandson of Abu Bakr. His traditions are mainly found in the works of al-Tabari, al-Balathuri, and al-Waqidi.
- Wahb ibn Munabbih (d. during 725 to 737, or 114–AH). Several books were ascribed to him but none of them are now existing. Some of his works survive as quotations found in works by Ibn Ishaq, Ibn Hisham, Ibn Jarir al-Tabari, Abū Nuʿaym al-Iṣfahānī, and others.
- Ibn Shihāb al-Zuhrī (d. c. 737), a central figure in sīra literature, who collected both ahadith and akhbār. His akhbār also contain chains of transmissions, or isnad. He was sponsored by the Umayyad court and asked to write two books, one on genealogy and another on maghāzī. The first was canceled and the one about maghāzī is either not extant or has never been written.
- Musa ibn ʿUqba, a student of al-Zuhrī, who wrote Kitab al-Maghazi. It was lost after 14th century, but two-thirds of the book was rediscovered in 1921 after a manuscript was found.
- Ma'mar Ibn Rashid, another student of al-Zuhri wrote Kitāb al-Maghāzi (The Expeditions), one of the earliest surviving prophetic biographies in Islamic literature, alongside that of Ibn Ishaq.
- Muhammad ibn Ishaq (d. 767 or 761), another student of al-Zuhrī, who collected oral traditions that formed the basis of an important biography of Muhammad. His work survived through that of his editors, most notably Ibn Hisham and Ibn Jarir al-Tabari.
- Ibn Jurayj (d. 150 AH), has been described as a "contemporary" of Ibn Ishaq and "rival authority based in Mecca"
- Abū Ishāq al-Fazarī (d. 186 AH) wrote Kitāb al-Siyar.
- Abu Ma'shar Najih Al-Madani (d. c. 787)
- Al-Waqidi, whose surviving work Kitab al-Tarikh wa al-Maghazi (Book of History and Campaigns) has been published.(Online link).
- Hisham Ibn Urwah ibn Zubayr, son of Urwah ibn Zubayr, generally quoted traditions from his father but was also a pupil of al-Zuhri.

=== 3rd century of Hijrah (817–913 CE) ===
- Al-Bakka'i was a disciple of Ibn Ishaq and teacher of Ibn Hisham and thus forms a very important link in Sira between the two great scholars.
- Abdul Malik Ibn Hisham, his work incorporated the text of Ibn Ishaq; he was a pupil of Al-Bakkaa'i.
- Ibn Sa'd wrote the 8-volume work called Tabaqat or The Book of the Major Classes; he was also a pupil of Al-Waqidi.
- Abu Isa Muhammad al-Tirmidhi wrote compilations of Shamaail (Characteristics of Muhammad)
- Muhammad ibn Jarir al-Tabari (d. 923) wrote the well-known work History of the Prophets and Kings, whose earlier books include the life of Muhammad, which cite Ibn Ishaq.

=== 4th century of Hijrah (914–1010 CE) ===
- Ibn Hibban (d.965) wrote Kitāb al-sīra al-nabawiyya wa akhbār al-khulafāʾ.

=== 5th century of Hijrah (1011–1108 CE) ===
- Ibn Abd al-Barr wrote al-Durar fi ikhtisar al-maghazi was-siyar.
- Abu Nu'aym al-Isfahani (d. 1038) wrote Dalail al-Nubuwwa.
- Al-Bayhaqi (d. 1066), wrote Dalail al-Nubuwwa.
- Al-Baghawi wrote al-Anwar fi Shama'il al-Nabi al-Mukhtar
- Ibn Hazm wrote Jamawiʿ al-Sīra (The Sira Synopsis), an abridgement of the work of Ibn Abd al-Barr.

=== 6th century of Hijrah (1109–1206 CE) ===
- Abu al-Qasim al-Suhayli (d. 1185), a grammarian from Málaga, wrote al-Rawd al-unuf, a commentary on Ibn Hisham's biography explaining the difficult and ambiguous words.

=== 7th century of Hijrah (1207–1303 CE) ===
- Al-Kalāʿī of Valencia (d. 1236) wrote a three-volume biography called al-Iktifāʾ. It follows the structure of Ibn Ishaq's sira with additional traditions from various other works.
- Abdul Mu'min al-Dimyati (d. 705AH/1305CE), wrote the book "al-Mukhtasar fi Sirati Sayyid Khair al-Bashar" but is commonly referred to as Sira of Al-Dimyati.

=== 8th century of Hijrah (1304–1400 CE) ===
- Fath al-Din Ibn Sayyid al-Nas (d. 1334), wrote a famous biography ʿUyūn al-athar fī funūn al-maghāzī wa al-shamāʾil wa al-siyar.
- Mughulṭāy (d. 762/1361) wrote al-Zahr al-bāsim in several volumes and an abridged version called al-Ishāra ila sīrat al-musṭafa.
- Ibn Kathir (d. 1373), wrote Al-Sira Al-Nabawiyya (Ibn Kathir).

=== Others (710–1100 CE) ===
- Zubayr ibn al-Awwam, the husband of Asma bint Abi Bakr.
- Asim Ibn Umar Ibn Qatada Al-Ansari
- Abdul Rahman ibn Abdul Aziz Al-Ausi, pupil of al-Zuhri
- Muhammad ibn Salih ibn Dinar Al-Tammar was a pupil of al-Zuhri and mentor of al-Waqidi.
- Ya'qub bin Utba Ibn Mughira Ibn Al-Akhnas Ibn Shuraiq al-Thaqafi
- Ali ibn mujahid Al razi Al kindi.
- Salama ibn Al-Fadl Al-Abrash Al-Ansari, pupil of Ibn Ishaq.
- Abu Sa`d al-Naysaburi wrote Sharaf al-Mustafa
- Faryabi wrote Dala'il al-Nubuwwa

== Later writers and biographies (1100–1517 CE) ==
- Mustafa son of Yusuf of Erzurum, completed Siyer-i Nebi
- Ala'al-Din Ali ibn Muhammad Al-Khilati Hanafi, wrote Sirat of Al-Khilati.
- Sheikh Zahir al-Din ibn Muhammad Gazaruni.
- Abu-al-Faraj ibn Al-Jawzi, wrote books on Sira such as al-Wafa bi-ahwal al-Mustafa and Sharaf al-Mustafa (full title of book: Uyun al-hikayat fi Sirat Sayyid al-Bariyya).
- Abu Rabi Sulaiman ibn Musa Al-Kala'i compiled a book titled "Iktifa fi Maghazi al-Mustafa wal-Khulafa al-Thalatha".
- Qadi `Iyad, wrote the famous al-Shifa bi ta`rif huquq al-Mustafa – Healing by the Recognition of the Rights of or News of the Chosen One.
- Zain al-Din Iraqi was a teacher of Ibn Hajar and he wrote Sira Manzuma.
- Al-Qastallani, his book on Sira is al-Mawahib al-Ladunniya.
- Al-Zurqani wrote a commentary on the al-Mawahib al-Ladunniya by Qastallani and it was called al-Zurqani 'ala al-Mawahib.
- Allama Burhanuddin al-Halabi, wrote Sirah al-Halabiyya.
- Al-Mawardi wrote I`lam al-Nubuwwa.
- `Abd al-Haqq al-Muhaddith al-Dahlawi wrote Madarij al-Nubuwwa.
- Mulla Nuruddin Jami wrote Shawahid al-Nubuwwa.
- Al-Aydurusi wrote Nur al-Safir.
- Bajuri wrote Sharh al-Mawahib al-laduniyya.
- Ibn Hajar al-Haytami wrote Ashraf al-wasa'il ila faham al-Shama'il.
- Ibn Mulaqqan wrote Ghayat al-sul fi Khasa'is al-Rasul.
- Ahmad Sirhindi al-Faruqi wrote Ithbat al-Nubuwwa.
- Ibn Dihya wrote Nihaya al-Sul fi Khasa'is al-Rasul.
- Jalaluddin al-Suyuti wrote Al Khasais-ul-Kubra, al-Khasa'is al-Sughra and Shama'il al-Sharifa.
- `Abd al-Ghani al-Maqdisi wrote al-Durra al-Mudiyya.
- Muhammad ibn Yusuf al-Salihi al-Shami wrote Subul al-huda wa al-Rashad fi Sirah Khayr al-`Ibad.
- Nuruddin `Ali ibn Ahmad al-Samhudi wrote Khulasa al-Wafa bi-Akhbar Dar al-Mustafa.
- `Izzuddin ibn Badruddin ibn Jama`ah al-Kinani wrote al-Mukhtasar al-kabir fi Sirah al-Rasul.
- Sheikh Abdullah bin Muhammad bin Abdul Wahab At-Tamimi An-Najdi wrote Mukhtasar Sirat Ar-Rasul, it is an abridgement of Sirat Ibn-e-Hisham. (available in Urdu PDF)

== 19th century CE ==
- Histoire des Arabes avec la Vie de Mahomet (1731). Translation (s.d. 18th century) reprinted (2001) as The Life of Mohammad: Or The Life of Mahomet, Henri de Boulainvilliers. Kessinger Publishing's Rare Reprints ISBN 0-7661-9102-8
- Bush, George (1831). The Life of Mohammed: Founder of the Religion of Islam, and of the Empire of the Saracens. J. & J. Harper.
- Gustav Weil, Mohammed der Prophet, sein Leben und seine Lehre (Stuttgart: J.B. Metzler'schen Buchhandlung, 1843)
- Washington Irving, Mahomet and His Successors (1850)
- Aloys Sprenger, The Life of Mohammad, from Original Sources (Allahabad: The Presbyterian Mission Press, 1851).
- William Muir, The Life of Muhammad and History of Islam to the Era of the Hegira (London: Smith, Elder & Co., 1858–1861), 4 vols. – several later editions with slightly different titles.
- Aloys Sprenger, Das Leben und die Lehre des Mohammad: Nach bisher größtentheils unbenutzten Quellen (Berlin: Nicolai'sche Verlagsbuchhandlung, 1861–1865), 3 vols – a revised 2nd edition was published in 1869.
- Theodor Nöldeke, Das Leben Muhammed's: Nach den Quellen populär dargestellt (Hannover: Carl Rümpler, 1863).

== Modern biographies (1900 CE – present) ==
- David Samuel Margoliouth (1905) wrote Mohammed and the Rise of Islam. New York and London: Putnam
- Muhammad Sulaiman Mansoorpuri wrote Rahmatul-lil-Alameen (Mercy for Mankind) in Urdu, First published in 1911, 3 volumes.
- Ashraf Ali Thanwi (1912) wrote Nashr al-Tib fi Zikr al-Nabi al-Habib
- Muhammad Shafi (1925) wrote Seerat Khatam al-Anbiya
- Muhammad Husayn Haykal wrote The Life of Muhammad in Arabic, 1933; later translated in English by Isma'il Raji A. al-Faruqi.
- Andrae, Tor (1933). Mohammed: The Man and His Faith. Dover. ISBN 0-486-41136-2.
- R. V. C. Bodley wrote The Messenger: The Life of Mohammed, Doubleday and Company, 1946, ISBN 9780837124230
- Régis Blachère, Le problème de Mahomet – Essai de biographie critique du fondateur de l'Islam (Paris: Presses universitaires de France, 1952).
- William Montgomery Watt wrote Muhammad at Mecca and Muhammad at Medina (1953 and 1956, Oxford University Press).
- Alfred Guillaume, Ibn Ishaq: The life of Muhammad, a translation of Ishaq's Sirat Rasul Allah, with introduction and notes, Oxford University Press, 1955, ISBN 0 19 636033 1(Online link).
- Maurice Gaudefroy-Demombynes wrote Mahomet (Paris: Éditions Albin Michel, 1957).
- Maxime Rodinson wrote Mahomet (Paris: Éditions du Seuil, 1960) – also translated into English (1961).
- Syed Abul Ala Maududi wrote Seerat-e-Sarwar-e-Alam (1978)
- Michael Cook wrote Muhammad (Oxford University Press, 1983) ISBN 978-0192876058
- Muhammad Hamidullah wrote four books on Sira, Muhammad Rasulullah: A concise survey of the life and work of the founder of Islam (1979); The Prophet of Islam: Prophet of Migration (1989); The Prophet's establishing a state and his succession (1988); Battlefields of the Prophet Muhammad (1992).
- Pir Muhammad Karam Shah al-Azhari wrote Zia un Nabi in Urdu which was later translated by Muhammad Qayyum Awan into English as Life of Prophet Muhammad, (1993)
- Martin Lings wrote Muhammad: His Life Based on the Earliest Sources (London: Islamic Texts Society, 1983), ISBN 978-0-04-297042-4.
- Muhammed al-Ghazali wrote Fiqh-us-Seerah: Understanding the Life of Prophet Muhammad (Brawtley Press, First published 1987) ISBN 9781943138623
- Mirza Bashiruddin Mahmood Ahmad wrote Life of Muhammad (Islam International Publications Limited, 1988).
- Karen Armstrong wrote Muhammad: A Biography of the Prophet (London: Victor Gollancz Ltd, 1991), and Muhammad: A Prophet for Our Time (New York: HarperCollins, 2006).
- Seyyed Hossein Nasr, Muhammad, Man of God (KAZI Publications, 1995) ISBN 978-1-56744-501-5
- Safiur Rahman Mubarakpuri wrote Ar-Raheeq Al-Makhtum [The Sealed Nectar] (Riyadh: Darussalam Publishers, First published 1996); Translated into English, French, Indonesian, and Malayalam (Online link).
- Yahiya Emerick wrote Muhammad (as part of Critical Lives series by Reaktion Books, First published 1994) ISBN 978-0028643717
- Barnaby Rogerson wrote The Prophet Muhammad: A Biography (HiddenSpring, 2003) ISBN 978-1587680298
- Ali al-Sallabi wrote The Noble Life of the Prophet (Riyadh: Darussalam Publishers, 2005), 3 vols.
- Fethullah Gülen wrote The Messenger of God: Muhammad (Tughra Books, 2005) ISBN 978-1932099836
- Mustafa al-Siba'i wrote The life of Prophet Muhammad: highlights and lessons, (International Islamic Publishing House, 2004) ISBN 978-9960850214
- Tariq Ramadan wrote In the Footsteps of the Prophet: Lessons from the Life of Muhammad (Oxford University Press, 2006) ISBN 978-0195308808
- Omid Safi wrote Memories of Muhammad: Why the Prophet Matters. (HarperOne, 2009) ISBN 978-0061231353
- Leila Abouzeid wrote Life of the Prophet – A Biography of Prophet Mohammed (2009) ISBN 9789954199251
- Jonathan A.C. Brown wrote Muhammad: A Very Short Introduction (Oxford University Press, 2011) ISBN 978-0199559282
- Adil Salahi wrote Muhammad: man and prophet, a complete study of the life of the Prophet of Islam (Leicester: Islamic Foundation, 2012). ISBN 978-0860374299
- Lesley Hazleton wrote The First Muslim: The Story of Muhammad (New York: Riverhead Books, 2013).
- Jonathan A.C. Brown also wrote Misquoting Muhammad: The Challenge and Choices of Interpreting the Prophet's Legacy (Oneworld Publications, 2014) ISBN 978-1780744216
- Muhammad Asadullah Al-Ghalib wrote Seeratur Rasool (SM) [The life of the Prophet Muhammad (SM)] in Bangla (Online link), First published in 2015 by Hadeeth Foundation Bangladesh.
- Safvet Halilović, Životopis posljednjeg Allahovog poslanika (Biography of Allah's last messenger) (Sarajevo: El Kalem, 2019)
- Joel Hayward, The Leadership of Muhammad (Swansea: Claritas Books, 2021) ISBN 978-180011-989-5.
- Mohamad Jebara, Muhammad the World-Changer: An Intimate Portrait (New York: St. Martin's Press, 2021) ISBN 978-1250239648.
- Joel Hayward, The Warrior Prophet: Muhammad and War (Swansea: Claritas Books, 2022) ISBN 978-1-8001198-0-2.
- Sarfaraz Hussain Shah wrote The Messenger of Mercy: A Call in Makkah. (The Middle Community, 2022) (ISBN 979-8-3636-3311-9)
- Dr Ishfaq Ahmad, The Perfect Human, Muhammad (PBUH) (Maktaba e Jadeed Press, 2022) (ISBN 978-1-7923-9117-0) (978-1-7923-9118-7)
- Yasir Qadhi, The Sīrah of the Prophet: A Contemporary and Original Analysis (Kube Publishing Ltd, 2023) ISBN 978-0860378785

== Biographies missing date of publication ==
- Muhammad Alawi al-Maliki wrote Muhammad Rasulallah.
- Muhammad Tahir-ul-Qadri wrote Sirah al-Rasul (14 volumes, in Urdu).
- As'ad Muhammad Sa`id al-Sagharji wrote Muhammad Rasulallah.
- Yusuf al-Nabhani wrote Fada'il al-Muhammadiyya, al-Anwar al-Muhammadiyya and Shawahid al-Haqq.
- Shibli Nomani wrote his famous 5 volume book Sirat-un-Nabi in Urdu with the help of his disciple Syed Sulaiman Nadvi. The book was translated in English by M. Tayyib Bakhsh Budayuni: ISBN 978-81-7151-282-9.
- Syed Sulaiman Nadvi wrote Muhammad The Ideal Prophet and Muhammad The Prophet Of Peace, later translated by Rauf Luther.
- Khwaja Shamsuddin Azeemi, wrote Muhammad-ur-Rasoolullah in 4 volumes.
- Abul Hasan Ali Nadwi wrote Muhammad Rasulullah .
- Naeem Siddiqui wrote Muhammad The Benefactor Of Humanity.
- Ahmed Deedat wrote Muhammad the Greatest and Muhammad the Natural Successor to Christ.
- Jamal Badawi wrote Muhammad A Blessing For Mankind, a Short Biography and Commentary.
- Khalid Masud wrote Hayat e Rasul e Ummi in Urdu (translated as: The Unlettered Prophet by Saadia Malik).
- Wahiduddin Khan wrote Prophet of Revolution
- Syed Shahabuddin Salfi Firdausi wrote Seerat e Badr-ud-Duja
- Muhammad Ibrahim Mir Sialkoti wrote Seerah Al-Mustafa

== See also ==
- Latin biographies of Muhammad
- List of Muslim historians
- List of hadith collections
- List of Islamic texts
