= Marrakesh Declaration =

2016 statement defending the rights of religious minorities

The Marrakesh Declaration is a statement made in January 2016 by "more than 250 Muslim religious leaders, heads of state, and scholars", which champions "defending the rights of religious minorities in predominantly Muslim countries". The declaration was made in Morocco and "representatives of persecuted religious communities — including Chaldean Catholics from Iraq" were included in the conference. The conference, at which the Marrakesh Declaration was signed, was called in response to the persecution of religious minorities, such as Christians and Yazidis, by ISIS.

The Marrakesh Declaration builds on historical Islamic sources such as the Charter of Medina. King Mohammed VI of Morocco stated "We in the kingdom of Morocco will not tolerate the violation of the rights of religious minorities in the name of Islam...I am enabling Christians and Jews to practice their faith and not just as minorities. They even serve in the government."

== Full Text ==
In the Name of God, the All-Merciful, the All-Compassionate

Executive Summary of the Marrakesh Declaration on the Rights of Religious Minorities in

Predominantly Muslim Majority Communities

25th-27th January 2016

WHEREAS, conditions in various parts of the Muslim World have deteriorated dangerously due to the use of violence and armed struggle as a tool for settling conflicts and imposing one's point of view;

WHEREAS, this situation has also weakened the authority of legitimate governments and enabled criminal groups to issue edicts attributed to Islam, but which, in fact, alarmingly distort its fundamental principles and goals in ways that have seriously harmed the population as a whole;

WHEREAS, this year marks the 1,400th anniversary of the Charter of Medina, a constitutional contract between the Prophet Muhammad, God's peace and blessings be upon him, and the people of Medina, which guaranteed the religious liberty of all, regardless of faith;

WHEREAS, hundreds of Muslim scholars and intellectuals from over 120 countries, along with representatives of Islamic and international organizations, as well as leaders from diverse religious groups and nationalities, gathered in Marrakesh on this date to reaffirm the principles of the Charter of Medina at a major conference;

WHEREAS, this conference was held under the auspices of His Majesty, King Mohammed VI of Morocco, and organized jointly by the Ministry of Endowment and Islamic Affairs in the Kingdom of Morocco and the Forum for Promoting Peace in Muslim Societies based in the United Arab Emirates;

AND NOTING the gravity of this situation afflicting Muslims as well as peoples of other faiths throughout the world, and after thorough deliberation and discussion, the convened Muslim scholars and intellectuals:

DECLARE HEREBY our firm commitment to the principles articulated in the Charter of Medina, whose provisions contained a number of the principles of constitutional contractual citizenship, such as freedom of movement, property ownership, mutual solidarity and defense, as well as principles of justice and equality before the law; and that,

The objectives of the Charter of Medina provide a suitable framework for national constitutions in countries with Muslim majorities, and the United Nations Charter and related documents, such as the Universal Declaration of Human Rights, are in harmony with the Charter of Medina, including consideration for public order.

NOTING FURTHER that deep reflection upon the various crises afflicting humanity underscores the inevitable and urgent need for cooperation among all religious groups, we

AFFIRM HEREBY that such cooperation must be based on a "Common Word," requiring that such cooperation must go beyond mutual tolerance and respect, to providing full protection for the rights and liberties to all religious groups in a civilized manner that eschews coercion, bias, and arrogance.

BASED ON ALL OF THE ABOVE, we hereby: Call upon Muslim scholars and intellectuals around the world to develop a jurisprudence of the concept of "citizenship" which is inclusive of diverse groups. Such jurisprudence shall be rooted in Islamic tradition and principles and mindful of global changes.

Urge Muslim educational institutions and authorities to conduct a courageous review of educational curricula that addresses honestly and effectively any material that instigates aggression and extremism, leads to war and chaos, and results in the destruction of our shared societies;

Call upon politicians and decision makers to take the political and legal steps necessary to establish a constitutional contractual relationship among its citizens, and to support all formulations and initiatives that aim to fortify relations and understanding among the various religious groups in the Muslim World;

Call upon the educated, artistic, and creative members of our societies, as well as organizations of civil society, to establish a broad movement for the just treatment of religious minorites in Muslim countries and to raise awareness as to their rights, and to work together to ensure the success of these efforts.

Call upon the various religious groups bound by the same national fabric to address their mutual state of selective amnesia that blocks memories of centuries of joint and shared living on the same land; we call upon them to rebuild the past by reviving this tradition of conviviality, and restoring our shared trust that has been eroded by extremists using acts of terror and aggression;

Call upon representatives of the various religions, sects and denominations to confront all forms of religious bigotry, villification, and denegration of what people hold sacred, as well as all speech that promote hatred and bigotry;

AND FINALLY, AFFIRM that it is unconscionable to employ religion for the purpose of aggressing upon the rights of religious minorities in Muslim countries.

Marrakesh

January 27th, 2016

== Responses ==
The declaration has been widely welcomed. Some commentators called for consistent legal and practical follow through of the sentiments expressed including in the country where the declaration was forged, which does not recognise its own indigenous Christians and persecutes and imprisons them, or in the birthplace of Islam, where there are reportedly many Saudi Christians.

== See also ==
- Ashtiname of Muhammad
- Human rights in Islamic countries
