= Ashtiname of Muhammad =

Covenant of Muhammad with the monks of Saint Catherine's Monastery

- The Covenant of the Prophet Muhammad with the Monks of Mount Sinai
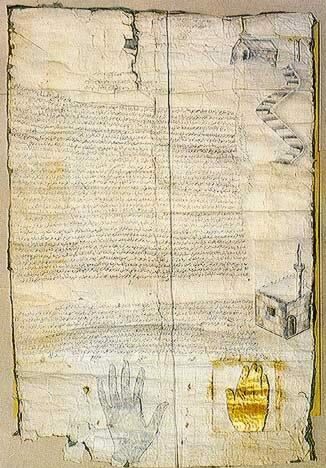
- Ascribed to: Ali (scribe), Muhammad (commissioner) 623 CE
- Manuscript(s): Copies at Saint Catherine's Monastery, and Simonopetra
- First printed edition: Shuqayr, Na‘um.(1916) Tarikh Sina al-qadim wa al-hadith wa jughrafiyatuha, ma‘a khulasat tarikh Misr wa al-Sham wa al-‘Iraq wa Jazirat al-‘Arab wa ma kana baynaha min al-‘ala’iq al-tijariyyah wa al-harbiyyah wa ghayriha ‘an tariq Sina’ min awwal ‘ahd al-tarikh il al-yawm. [al-Qahirah]: n.p., 1916.

The Ashtiname of Muhammad, also known as the Covenant or Testament of Muhammad, is a charter or writ granting protection and other privileges to Christians, given to the monks of Saint Catherine's Monastery in the Sinai Peninsula. It is sealed with an imprint representing Muhammad's hand.

Āshtīnāmeh (Persian pronunciation: [ɒʃtinɒme]) [آشتی نامه] is a Persian phrase meaning "Letter of Reconciliation", a term for a treaty or covenant.

== History ==
Arabic to Latin translation from 1630

According to the monks' tradition, Muhammad frequented the monastery and had great relationships and discussions with the Sinai fathers.

Several certified historical copies are displayed in the library of St Catherine. The monks claim that during the Ottoman conquest of Egypt in the Ottoman–Mamluk War (1516–17), the original document was seized from the monastery by Ottoman soldiers and taken to Sultan Selim I's palace in Istanbul for safekeeping. A copy was then made to compensate for its loss at the monastery. It also seems that the charter was renewed under the new rulers, as other documents in the archive suggest. Traditions about the tolerance shown towards the monastery were reported in governmental documents issued in Cairo and during the period of Ottoman rule (1517–1798), the Pasha of Egypt annually reaffirmed its protections.

In 1916, Na'um Shuqayr published the Arabic text of the Ashtiname in his Tarikh Sina al-qadim or History of Ancient Sinai. The Arabic text, along with its German translation, was published for a second time in 1918 in Bernhard Moritz's Beiträge zur Geschichte des Sinai-Klosters.

The Testamentum et pactiones inter Mohammedem et Christianae fidei cultores, which was published in Arabic and Latin by Gabriel Sionita in 1630 represents a covenant concluded between Muhammad and the Christians of the World. It is not a copy of the Ashtiname.

The origins of the Ashtiname has been the subject of a number of different traditions, best known through the accounts of European travellers who visited the monastery. These authors include the French knight Greffin Affagart (d. c. 1557), the French traveller Jean de Thévenot (d. 1667) and the English prelate Richard Peacocke, who included an English translation of the text.

== Document ==
=== English translation of the Ashtiname by Anton F. Haddad ===
This is a letter which was issued by Mohammed, Ibn Abdullah, the Messenger, the Prophet, the Faithful, who is sent to all the people as a trust on the part of God to all His creatures, that they may have no plea against God hereafter—Verily God is the Mighty, the Wise. This letter is directed to the embracers of Islam, as a Covenant given to the followers of Nazerene in the East and West, the far and the near, the Arabs and foreigners, the known and the unknown.

This letter contains the oath given unto them, and he who disobeys that which is therein, will be considered a disobeyor and a transgressor to that whereunto he is commanded. He will be regarded as one who has corrupted the oath of God, disbelieved His Testament, rejected His Authority, despised His Religion, and made himself deserving of His Curse, whether he is a Sultan or any other believer of Islam.

Whenever monks, devotees and pilgrims gather together, whether in a mountain or valley, or den, or frequented place, or plain, or church, or in houses of worship, Verily we are back of them and shall protect them, and their properties and their morals, by Myself, by My friends and by My assistants, for they are of My subjects and under My protection.

I shall exempt them from that which may disturb them; of the burdens which are paid by others as an oath of allegiance. They must not give anything of their income but that which pleases them—they must not be offended, or disturbed, or coerced or compelled. Their judges should not be changed or prevented from accomplishing their offices, nor the monks disturbed in exercising their religious order, or the people of seclusion be stopped from dwelling in their cells.

No one is allowed to plunder their pilgrims, or destroy or spoil any of their churches, or houses of worship, or take any of the things contained within these houses and bring it to the houses of Islam. And he who takes away anything therefrom, will be one who has corrupted the oath of God, and, in truth, disobeyed His messenger.

Poll-taxes should not be put upon their judges, monks, and those whose occupation is the worship of God; nor is any other thing to be taken from them, whether it be a fine, a tax or any unjust right. Verily I shall keep their compact, wherever they may be, in the sea or on the land, in the East or West, in the North or South, for they are under My protection and the testament of My safety, against all things which they abhor.

No taxes or tithes should be received from those who devote themselves to the worship of God in the mountains, or from those who cultivate the Holy Lands. No one has the right to interfere with their affairs, or bring any action against them—Verily this is for aught else and not for them; rather, in the seasons of crops, they should be given a Kadah for each Ardab of wheat (about five bushels and a half) as provision for them, and no one has the right to say to them this is too much, or ask them to pay any tax.

As to those who possess properties, the wealthy and merchants, the poll-tax to be taken from them must not exceed twelve Dirhams a head per year. (Note: A current price of 16.75 USD per year.)

They shall not be imposed upon by any one to undertake a journey, or to be forced to go to wars or to carry arms; for the Islams have to fight for them. Do not dispute or argue with them, but deal according to the verse recorded in the Koran, to wit: 'Do not dispute or argue with the people of the Book but in that which is best.' Thus they will live favored and protected from everything which may offend them by the Callers to religion (Islam), wherever they may be and in any place they may dwell.

Should any Christian woman be married to a Musluman, such marriage must not take place except after her consent, and she must not be prevented from going to her church for prayer. Their churches must be honored and they must not be withheld from building churches or repairing convents.

They must not be forced to carry arms or stones; but the Islams must protect them and defend them against others. It is positively incumbent upon every one of the Islam nation not to contradict or disobey this oath until the Day of Resurrection and the end of the world.

== Authenticity ==
Many early modern scholars accepted the authenticity of the work, including Franciscus Quaresmius, Balthasar de Monconys, and Kara Mustafa Pasha. The modern Muslim scholar John Andrew Morrow also believes in the authenticity of the document, pointing out that the document is replicated verbatim across numerous Islamic sources, including more than a thousand years of Caliphs and Sultans. However, since the 19th century several aspects of the Ashtiname, notably the list of witnesses, have been questioned by some scholars, with several noting the lack of any reference to such documents in classical Islamic texts. There are similarities to other documents granted to other religious communities in the Near East. One example is Muhammad's alleged letter to the Christians of Najran, which first came to light in 878 in a monastery in Iraq and whose text is preserved in the Chronicle of Seert.

== Modern influence ==
Some have argued that the Ashtiname is a resource for building bridges between Muslims and Christians. For example, in 2009, in the pages of The Washington Post, Muqtedar Khan translated the document in full, arguing:

Those who seek to foster discord among Muslims and Christians focus on issues that divide and emphasize areas of conflict. But when resources such as Muhammad's promise to Christians is invoked and highlighted it builds bridges. It inspires Muslims to rise above communal intolerance and engenders goodwill in Christians who might be nursing fear of Islam or Muslims.

In 2018, the final legal judgement in the Pakistani Asia Bibi blasphemy case cited the covenant. It said that one of Noreen's accusers violated the Ashtiname of Muhammad, a "covenant made by Muhammad with Christians in the seventh century but still valid today". In 2019, Imran Khan, former Prime Minister of Pakistan, cited the covenant in a speech delivered at the World Government Summit.

== See also ==
- Constitution of Medina
- Marrakesh Declaration
- Seal of Muhammad
