= Ibn Ishaq =

Muslim hagiographer and historian (704–767)

- ٱبْن إِسْحَاق
- Title: Ṣāḥib al-Sīra

Personal life
- Born: 699 AD Medina, Umayyad Caliphate
- Died: 767 AD Baghdad, Abbasid Caliphate
- Era: Umayyad and Abbasid
- Main interest: Prophetic biography
- Notable work: al-Sira al-nabawiyya ('Life of the Prophet')

Religious life
- Religion: Islam

Muslim leader
- Students: Al-Bakka'i; Salama ibn al-Fadl

Abu Abd Allah Muhammad ibn Ishaq ibn Yasar al-Muttalibi (Arabic: أَبُو عَبْدِ ٱلله مُحَمَّد ٱبْن إِسْحَاق ٱبْن يَسَار ٱلْمُطَّلِبيّ, romanized: Abū ʿAbd Allāh Muḥammad ibn ʾIsḥāq ibn Yasār al-Muṭṭalibī; c. 699–767), known simply as Ibn Ishaq, was an 8th-century Muslim historian and hagiographer who collected oral traditions that formed the basis of an important biography of the Islamic prophet Muhammad. His biography is known as the Sīrat Rasūl Allāh or Al-Sirah al-Nabawiyyah, and it has mainly survived through several recensions.

== Life ==
Born in Medina c. 704 AD (85 AH), ibn Isḥaq's grandfather was Yasār ibn Khiyar One of forty Christian or Jewish boys who had been held captive in a monastery at Ayn al-Tamr. After being found in one of Khalid ibn al-Walid's campaigns, Yasār was taken to Medina and enslaved to Qays ibn Makhrama ibn al-Muṭṭalib ibn ʿAbd Manāf ibn Quṣayy. On his conversion to Islam, he was manumitted as "mawlā" (client), thus acquiring the surname, or "nisbat", al-Muṭṭalibī. His three sons, Mūsā, ʿAbd al-Raḥmān, and Isḥāq, were transmitters of "akhbār", i.e. they collected and recounted written and oral testaments of the past. Isḥāq married the daughter of another mawlā and from this marriage Ibn Isḥāq was born.

No facts of Ibn Isḥāq's early life are known, but it is likely that he followed in the family tradition of transmission of early akhbār and hadith. He was influenced by the work of ibn Shihab al-Zuhri, who praised the young ibn Ishaq for his knowledge of "maghāzī" (stories of military expeditions). Around the age of 30, ibn Isḥaq arrived in Alexandria and studied under Yazīd ibn Abī Ḥabīb. After his return to Medina, based on one account, he was ordered out of Medina for attributing a hadith to a woman he had not met, Fāṭima bint al-Mundhir, the wife of Hishām ibn ʿUrwa. But those who defended him, like Sufyan ibn ʽUyaynah, stated that Ibn Ishaq told them that he did meet her. Also ibn Ishaq disputed with the young Malik ibn Anas, famous for the Maliki School of Fiqh. Leaving Medina (or forced to leave), he traveled eastwards towards "al-Irāq", stopping in Kufa, also al-Jazīra, and into Iran as far as Ray, before returning west. Eventually he settled in Baghdad. There, the new Abbasid dynasty, having overthrown the Umayyad dynasty, was establishing a new capital.

Ibn Isḥaq moved to the capital and found patrons in the new regime. He became a tutor employed by the Abbasid caliph Al-Mansur, who commissioned him to write an all-encompassing history book starting from the creation of Adam to the present day, known as "al-Mubtadaʾ wa al-Baʿth wa al-Maghāzī" (lit. "In the Beginning, the mission [of Muhammad], and the expeditions"). It was kept in the court library of Baghdad. Part of this work contains the Sîrah or biography of the Prophet, the rest was once considered a lost work, but substantial fragments of it survive. He died in Baghdad in 767.

== Biography of Muhammad ==
=== Original versions, survival ===
Ibn Isḥaq collected oral traditions about the life of the Islamic prophet Muhammad. These traditions, which he orally dictated to his pupils, are now known collectively as the Sīrat Rasūl Allāh (Arabic: سيرة رسول الله, "Life of the Messenger of God") and survive mainly in the following sources:

- An edited copy, or recension, of his work by his student al-Bakka'i, which was further edited by ibn Hisham and published as Al-Sīrah al-Nabawiyyah. Al-Bakka'i's work has perished and only ibn Hisham's has survived, in copies. Ibn Hisham edited out of his work "things which it is disgraceful to discuss; matters which would distress certain people; and such reports as al-Bakka'i told me he could not accept as trustworthy."
- An edited copy, or recension, prepared by his student Salamah ibn Fadl al-Ansari. This also has perished, and survives only in the copious extracts to be found in the voluminous History of the Prophets and Kings by Muhammad ibn Jarir al-Tabari.
- Fragments of several other recensions. Guillaume lists them on p. 30 of his preface, but regards most of them as so fragmentary as to be of little worth.

According to Donner, the material in ibn Hisham and al-Tabari is "virtually the same". However, there is some material to be found in al-Tabari that was not preserved by ibn Hisham. For example, al-Tabari includes the controversial episode of the Satanic Verses, while ibn Hisham does not.

Following the publication of previously unknown fragments of ibn Isḥaq's traditions, recent scholarship suggests that ibn Isḥaq did not commit to writing any of the traditions now extant, but they were narrated orally to his transmitters. These new texts, found in accounts by Salama al-Ḥarranī and Yūnus ibn Bukayr, were hitherto unknown and contain versions different from those found in other works.

==== Reconstruction of the text by Guillaume ====
The original text of the Sīrat Rasūl Allāh by Ibn Ishaq did not survive. However, much of the original text was copied over into a work of his own by Ibn Hisham (Basra; Fustat, died 833 AD).

Ibn Hisham also "abbreviated, annotated, and sometimes altered" the text of Ibn Ishaq, according to Guillaume (on p. 17). Interpolations made by Ibn Hisham are said to be recognizable and can be deleted, leaving as a remainder, a so-called "edited" version of Ibn Ishaq's original text (otherwise lost). In addition, Guillaume (on p. 31) points out that Ibn Hisham's version omits various narratives in the text which were given by al-Tabari in his History. In these passages al-Tabari expressly cites Ibn Ishaq as a source.

Thus can be reconstructed an 'improved' "edited" text, i.e., by distinguishing or removing Ibn Hisham's additions, and by adding from al-Tabari passages attributed to Ibn Ishaq. Yet the result's degree of approximation to Ibn Ishaq's original text can only be conjectured. Such a reconstruction is available, e.g., in Guillaume's translation. Here, Ibn Ishaq's introductory chapters describe pre-Islamic Arabia, before he then commences with the narratives surrounding the life of Muhammad (in Guillaume at pp. 109–690).

=== Reception ===
Notable scholars like the jurist Ahmad ibn Hanbal appreciated his efforts in collecting sīra narratives and accepted him on maghāzī, despite having reservations on his methods on matters of fiqh. Ibn Ishaq also influenced later sīra writers like Ibn Hishām and Ibn Sayyid al-Nās. Other scholars, like Ibn Qayyim Al-Jawziyya, made use of his chronological ordering of events.

The most widely discussed criticism of his sīra was that of his contemporary Mālik ibn Anas. Mālik rejected the stories of Muhammad and the Jews of Medina on the ground that they were taken solely based on accounts by sons of Jewish converts. These same stories have also been denounced as "odd tales" (gharāʾib) later by ibn Hajar al-Asqalani. Mālik and others also thought that ibn Isḥāq exhibited Qadari tendencies, had a preference for Ali (Guillaume also found evidence of this, pp. 22 &24), and relied too heavily on what were later called the Isrā'īlīyāt. Furthermore, early literary critics, like ibn Sallām al-Jumaḥī and ibn al-Nadīm, censured ibn Isḥāq for knowingly including forged poems in his biography, and for attributing poems to persons not known to have written any poetry. The 14th-century historian al-Dhahabī, using hadith terminology, noted that in addition to the forged (makdhūb) poetry, Ibn Isḥāq filled his sīra with munqaṭiʿ (broken chain of narration) and munkar (suspect narrator) reports.

Guillaume notices that Ibn Isḥāq frequently uses a number of expressions to convey his skepticism or caution. Beside a frequent note that only God knows whether a particular statement is true or not (p. 19), Guillaume suggests that Ibn Isḥāq deliberately substitutes the ordinary term "ḥaddathanī" (he narrated to me) by a word of suspicion "zaʿama" ("he alleged") to show his skepticism about certain traditions (p. 20).

=== Translations ===
In 1864 the Heidelberg professor Gustav Weil published an annotated German translation in two volumes. Several decades later the Hungarian scholar Edward Rehatsek prepared an English translation, but it was not published until over a half-century later.

The best-known translation in a Western language is Alfred Guillaume's 1955 English translation, but some have questioned the reliability of this translation. In it Guillaume combined ibn Hisham and those materials in al-Tabari cited as ibn Isḥaq's whenever they differed or added to ibn Hisham, believing that in so doing he was restoring a lost work. The extracts from al-Tabari are clearly marked, although sometimes it is difficult to distinguish them from the main text (only a capital "T" is used).

== Other works ==
Ibn Isḥaq wrote several works. His major work is al-Mubtadaʾ wa al-Baʿth wa al-Maghāzī—the Kitab al-Mubtada and Kitab al-Mab'ath both survive in part, particularly al-Mab'ath, and al-Mubtada otherwise in substantial fragments. He is also credited with the lost works Kitāb al-kh̲ulafāʾ, which al-Umawwī related to him (Fihrist, 92; Udabāʾ, VI, 401) and a book of Sunan (Ḥād̲j̲d̲j̲ī Ḵh̲alīfa, II, 1008).

== Reliability of his hadith ==
In hadith studies, ibn Isḥaq's hadith (considered separately from his prophetic biography) is generally thought to be "good" (ḥasan) (assuming an accurate and trustworthy isnad, or chain of transmission) and himself having a reputation of being "sincere" or "trustworthy" (ṣadūq). However, a general analysis of his isnads has given him the negative distinction of being a mudallis, meaning one who did not always name his teacher, claiming instead to narrate directly from his teacher's teacher.

Others, like Ahmad ibn Hanbal, rejected his narrations on all matters related to fiqh. Al-Dhahabī concluded that the soundness of his narrations regarding ahadith is hasan, except in hadith where he is the sole transmitter which should probably be considered as munkar. He added that some Imams mentioned him, including Muslim ibn al-Hajjaj, who cited five of Ibn Ishaq's ahadith in his Sahih.

== See also ==
- Ibn Sufi
- List of biographies of Muhammad
- List of Muslim historians

== Bibliography ==
=== Primary sources ===
- Alfred Guillaume, The Life of Muhammad. A Translation of Isḥaq's "Sirat Rasul Allah", with introduction [pp. xiii–xliii] and notes (Oxford University, 1955), xlvii + 815 pages. The Arabic text used by Guillaume was the Cairo edition of 1355/1937 by Mustafa al-Saqqa, Ibrahim al-Abyari and Abdul-Hafiz Shalabi, as well as another, that of F. Wustenfeld (Göttingen, 1858–1860). Ibn Hasham's "notes" are given at pages 691–798. digital scan
  - Ishaq, Ibn; Guillaume, A. (18 July 2002). The Life of Muhammad. United States: Oxford University Press. p. 860. ISBN 978-0196360331. OCLC 911693736.
- Gustav Weil, Das Leben Mohammed's nach Mohammed Ibn Ishak, bearbeitet von Abd el-Malik Ibn Hischam (Stuttgart: J.B. Metzler'schen Buchhandlung, 1864), 2 volumes. The Sirah Rasul Allah translated into German with annotations. digital edition
- Ibn Isḥaq, The Life of Muhammad. Apostle of Allah (London: The Folio Society, 1964), 177 pages. From a translation by Edward Rehatsek (Hungary 1819 – Mumbai [Bombay] 1891), abridged and introduced [at pp. 5–13] by Michael Edwards. Rehatsek completed his translation; in 1898 it was given to the Royal Asiatic Society of London by F.F. Arbuthnot.
- Ibn Isḥaq (2004). Al-Mazīdī, Aḥmad Farīd (ed.). Al-Sīrah al-Nabawiyah li-ibn Isḥāq (السيرة النبوية لابن إسحاق) (in Arabic). Bayrūt: Dār al-kutub al-ʻilmiyah. ISBN 978-2-7451-3982-5.
- Ibn Isḥaq (1976). Hamidullah, Muhammad (ed.). Sīrat ibn Isḥāq al-musammāh bi-kitāb al-Mubtadaʼ wa-al-Mabʻath wa-al-maghāzī (سيرة ابن اسحاق، المسماة بكتاب المبتدأ والمبعث والمغازي ) (in Arabic). Al-Rabāṭ al-Maghrib: Maʻhad al-Dirāsāt wa-al-Abḥāth lil-Taʻrīb.

=== Traditional biographies ===
- Ibn Sayyid al-Nās, ʿUyūn al-athar fī funūn al-maghāzī wa al-shamāʾil wa al-siyar.
- Al-Khaṭīb al-Baghdādī, Tārīkh Baghdād.
- Al-Dhahabī, Mīzān al-iʿtidāl fī naqd al-rijāl.
- Yāqūt al-Ḥamawī, Irshād al-arīb fī mʿrefat al-adīb.

=== Secondary sources ===
- Donner, Fred McGraw (1998). Narratives of Islamic origins: the beginnings of Islamic historical writing. Darwin Press. ISBN 978-0-87850-127-4.
- Robinson, Chase, Islamic Historiography, Cambridge University Press, 2003, ISBN 0-521-58813-8
- 'Arafat, W. (1958-01-01). "Early Critics of the Authenticity of the Poetry of the "Sīra"". Bulletin of the School of Oriental and African Studies, University of London. 21 (1/3): 453–463. doi:10.1017/s0041977x00060110. ISSN 0041-977X. JSTOR 610611. S2CID 194960198.
