= Mahomet and His Successors =

1850 book written by Washington Irving

- A French edition of Mahomet and His Successors
- Author: Washington Irving
- Language: English
- Genre: Biography History
- Publication date: 1850
- Publication place: New York and London

Mahomet and His Successors is a book written by American author Washington Irving, and published in 1850. It is in two parts, the first covering the life of Muhammad, the second and longer covering the lives of his immediate successors.

== Composition and publication history ==
Irving began writing notes for a book on Muhammad as early as 1827 while working on his biography of Christopher Columbus. He completed the first chapters of the book while simultaneously working on his Tales of the Alhambra. He offered The Life of Mahomet to Murray in England for 500 guineas. In a letter to the head of the firm, John Murray, dated October 8, 1827, Irving said: "In our conversation you will recollect it was agreed that I should receive 500 Gs. for the Legendary life of Mahomet ... I will thank you to have the work put to press as soon as possible". Irving later said The Life of Mahomet was set for inclusion in Murray's family library in 1831, but "circumstances prevented its publication at that time".

After returning to the United States from several years abroad and settling at his New York home Sunnyside, Irving revised The Life of Mahomet in 1849, and completed Lives of the Successors of Mahomet the following year. The two parts were published together as Mahomet and His Successors in 1850, with first editions appearing simultaneously in the United States (G. P. Putnam) and the United Kingdom (John Murray).

The work went through many editions in the nineteenth century, and the two parts were sometimes published separately. The first part, under the title of Mohammed, was reissued by Wordsworth in 2007.
