= Agreement =

Agreement and Agree may refer to:

== Agreements between people and organizations ==
- Gentlemen's agreement, not enforceable by law
- Trade agreement, between countries
- Consensus (disambiguation), a decision-making process
- Contract, enforceable in a court of law
  - Meeting of the minds (a.k.a. mutual agreement), a common understanding in the formation of a contract
- Pact, convention, or treaty between nations, sub-national entities, organizations, corporations

== Arts and media ==
- Agreement, a 1978 book of poetry by Peter Seaton
- Agreement (film), a 1980 Bollywood film
- Agreeee, 2025 video game

== Science and mathematics ==
- Agreement (linguistics) or concord, a change in the form of a word depending on grammatical features of another word
- Consistency, logical agreement between two or more propositions
- Reliability (statistics) in the sense of, for example, inter-rater agreement

== Other uses ==
- Agreement (political party), a Polish political party
- Zgoda (electoral alliance), a Polish electoral alliance
- Operation Agreement, a British 1942 military operation during the Western Desert Campaign

== See also ==
- Agree (surname)
- Argument
- Agrément, an agreement by a state to receive members of a diplomatic mission
