= Al-Sirah al-Nabawiyyah (Ibn Hisham) =

Early biography of Muhammad

Al-Sirah al-Nabawiyyah (Revised) Siraat-e Ibn Hisham
- Original title: السيرة النبوية
- Language: Arabic
- Genre: Early Islamic History, History of Muhammad
- Publication place: Caliphate

Al-Sīrah al-Nabawiyyah (السيرة النبوية, 'The Life of the Prophet') also known as Siraat-e Ibn Hisham and Sirat Al Nabi is a prophetic biography of the Islamic prophet Muhammad, written by Ibn Hisham. According to Islamic tradition, the book is an edited recension of Ibn Isḥāq's Sīratu Rasūli l-Lāh (سيرة رسول الله) 'The Life of God's Messenger'. The work of Ibn Hishām and al-Tabari work, along with fragments by several others, are the only surviving copies of the work traditionally attributed to Ibn Ishaq. Ibn Hishām and al-Tabarī share virtually the same material.

Ibn Hishām said in the preface that he chose from the original work of Ibn Isḥāq in the tradition of his disciple Ziyād al-Baqqāʾi (d. 799), omitting stories from Al-Sīrah that contain no mention of Muḥammad, certain poems, traditions whose accuracy Ziyād al-Baqqāʾi (Note: Ziyād al-Baqqāʾi (d. 183/799), lived mostly in Kufa. Ibn Hishām's knowledge of Ibn Isḥāq's biography derived from al-Baqqāʾi.) could not confirm, and offensive passages that could offend the reader. Al-Tabari includes controversial episodes of the Satanic Verses including an apocryphal story about Muḥammad's attempted suicide. Ibn Hishām gives more accurate versions of the poems he includes and supplies explanations of difficult terms and phrases of the Arabic language, additions of genealogical content to certain proper names, and brief descriptions of the places mentioned in Al-Sīrah. Ibn Hishām appends his notes to the corresponding passages of the original text with the words: "qāla Ibn Hishām" (Ibn Hishām says).

== History of compilation ==
According to Islamic tradition, the first biographers of Muhammad were Urwa ibn al-Zubayr (d. 714), Aban ibn Uthman (d. 727), Wahb ibn Munabbih (d. 732), Shurahbil ibn Sa'd (d. 745), Ibn Shihāb al-Zuhrī (d. 746), and Abu Bakr ibn Muhammad ibn Hazm (d. 757). None of these works exist today. Islamic tradition teaches that these biographers were followed by Musa ibn Uqba (d. 763), Mu'ammar ibn Rashid (d. 772), and Muhammad ibn Ishaq (d. 774). Only the biography of Musa ibn Uqba is extant today and has recently been published. Islamic tradition than posits a third generation of biographers Ziyad al-Bakka'i (d. 805), Al-Waqidi (d. 829), Ibn Hisham (d. 218), and Muhammad ibn Sa'd (d. 852). According to Islamic tradition Ibn Ishaq's biography from the early Abbasid period was the most renowned and highly documented, but no copies exist. Half a century later, Ibn Hisham rewrote the alleged biography of Ibn Ishaq as narrated to him by Ziyad al-Bakka'i. Two versions of the biography exist today. Both published by Ibn Hisham under the same title. The earlier edition has undergone less editing and censorship than the later edition.

== Reconstruction of text ==
According to Islamic tradition, Ibn Isḥaq collected oral traditions about the life of Muhammad. These traditions, which he orally dictated to his pupils, are now known collectively as Sīratu Rasūli l-Lāh (Arabic: سيرة رسول الله "Life of the Messenger of God"). The text of the Sīrat Rasūl Allāh by Ibn Ishaq exists. Two edited copies, or recension, of his work attributed to his student al-Bakka'i, which Islamic tradition teaches was further edited and published by Ibn Hisham do exist.

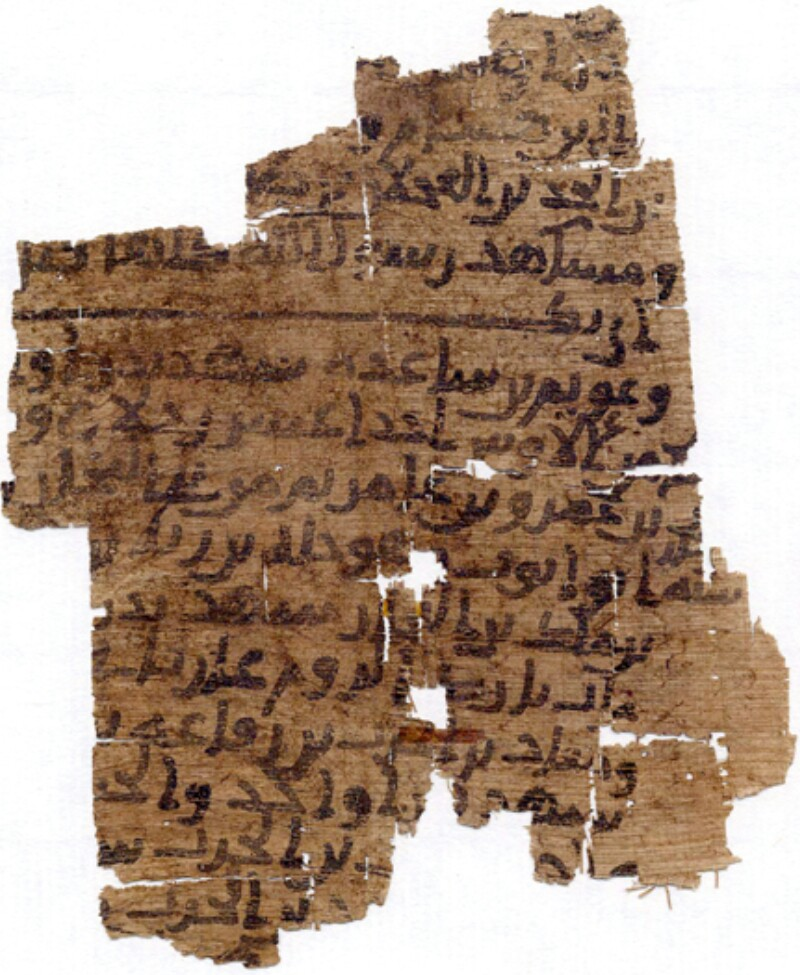
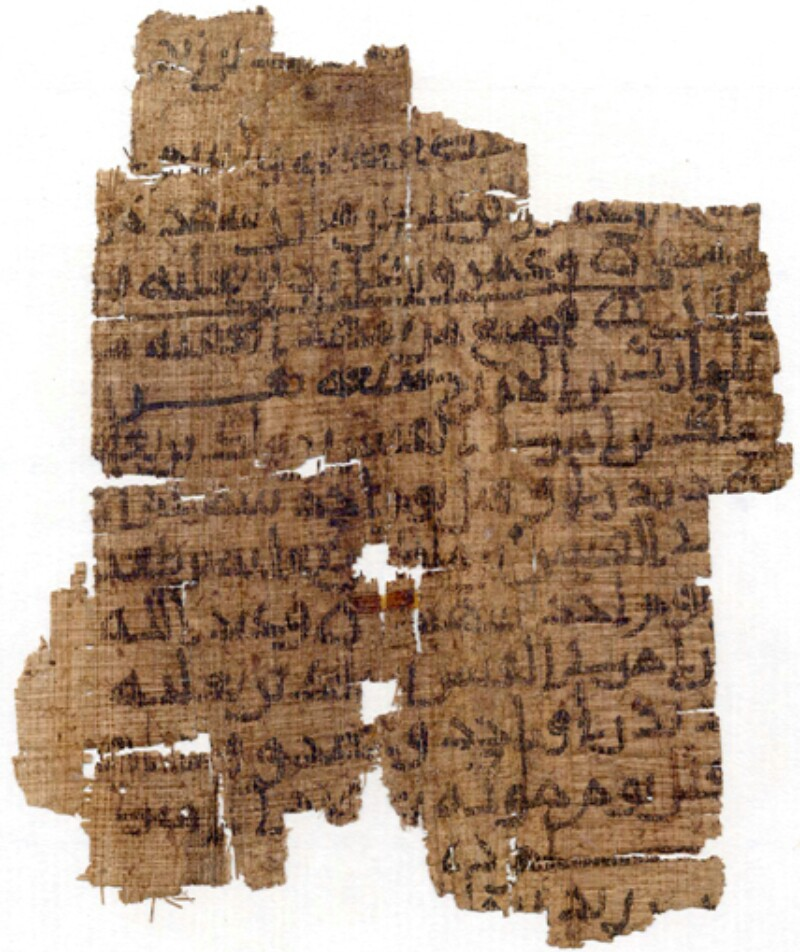
PERF No. 665: The earliest extant manuscript of The Sirah Of Prophet Muḥammad by Ibn Hishām. This manuscript is believed to be transmitted by students of Ibn Hishām (d. 218 AH /834 CE), perhaps soon after his death.

Ibn Hisham also "abbreviated, annotated, and sometimes altered" the text of Ibn Ishaq, according to Guillaume (at p. xvii). Interpolations made by Ibn Hisham are said to be recognizable and can be deleted, leaving as a remainder, a so-called "edited" version of Ibn Ishaq's original text (otherwise lost). In addition, Guillaume (at p. xxxi) points out that Ibn Hisham's version omits various narratives in the text which were given by al-Tabari in his History. In these passages al-Tabari expressly cites Ibn Ishaq as a source.

Thus can be reconstructed an 'improved' "edited" text, i.e., by distinguishing or removing Ibn Hisham's additions, and by adding from al-Tabari passages attributed to Ibn Ishaq. Yet the result's degree of approximation to Ibn Ishaq's original text can only be conjectured. Such a reconstruction is available, e.g., in Guillaume's translation. Here, Ibn Ishaq's introductory chapters describe pre-Islamic Arabia, before he then commences with the narratives surrounding the life of Muhammad (in Guillaume at pp. 109–690).

== Translations and editions ==
Later Ibn Hishām's As-Sira would chiefly be transmitted by his pupil, Ibn al-Barqī. This treatment of Ibn Ishāq's work was circulated to scholars in Cordoba in Islamic Spain by around 864. The first printed edition was published in Arabic by the German orientalist Ferdinand Wüstenfeld, in Göttingen (1858-1860). The Life of Moḥammad According to Moḥammed b. Ishāq, ed. 'Abd al-Malik b. Hisham. Gustav Weil (Stuttgart 1864) was the first published translation.

In the 20th century the book has been printed several times in the Middle East. The German orientalist Gernot Rotter produced an abridged (about one third) German translation of The Life of the Prophet. As-Sīra An-Nabawīya. (Spohr, Kandern in the Black Forest 1999). An English translation by the British orientalist Alfred Guillaume: The Life of Muhammad. A translation of Ishaq's Sirat Rasul Allah. (1955); 11th edition. (Oxford University Press, Karachi 1996).

== Influence ==
Ibn Ishaq's works had been referenced numerous times as a major source of information by future scholars who would delve into the biography of Muhammad. For a very long time, the biography by Ibn Ishaq was known amongst Islamic scholars as the biography by Ibn Hisham because Ibn Hisham narrated and edited it. Ibn Khallikan said, "Ibn Hisham is who compiled the biography of the Messenger of Allah from battles and stories narrated by Ibn Ishaq and it is the biography in the people's hands, known as the biography by Ibn Hisham". Abdul-Qasim Abdur-Rahman as-Suhayli (d. 581) presented an extensive annotation of the biography of his book, Ar-Rawd al-Anf. After this, Abu Dharr al-Khushayni (d. 604) addressed the parts that were unclear, as well as providing some criticism in his Sharh Al-Sirah al-Nabawiyyah.

== See also ==
- List of biographies of Muhammad
- List of Sunni books
