= History of the Prophets and Kings =

Arabic-language historical chronicle by al-Tabari

- 16-volume English edition of Tabari's history
- Author: al-Tabari
- Original title: تاريخ الأمم والملوك تاريخ الرسل والملوك تاریخ الطبري
- Language: Arabic
- Subject: History of the World, Islam and Arab Caliphates
- Genre: Historical biography of events
- Publication date: 10th century
- Pages: 16 volumes

The History of the Prophets and Kings (Arabic: تاريخ الرسل والملوك Tārīkh al-Rusul wa al-Mulūk), or The History of the Nations and Kings more commonly known as Tarikh al-Tabari (تاريخ الطبري) or Tarikh-i Tabari or The History of al-Tabari (Persian: تاریخ طبری) is an Arabic-language historical chronicle completed by the Muslim historian Muhammad ibn Jarir al-Tabari (225–310 AH, 838–923 AD) in 915 AD, presenting a history of the known world, from its creation to the Abbasid era, up until the time when the text was completed. Al-Tabari's Tarikh is considered one of the most important sources for early Islamic history, and it appeared during an intense period of canonization of Islamic history, representing a culminating prism through which subsequent Muslims read and learned about the past. According to Fred Donner, "it is reasonable to consider al-Ṭabarī's work as a representative product of the early Islamic historiographical tradition, if not, indeed, as the culmination and crowning glory of that tradition."

Al-Tabari arranges his material chronologically into annals (or, year after year), as opposed to biographically (i.e. narrating the life of one figure, then another, and so on), which makes his work useful for understanding broad historical themes. His work is also not sectarian, and is broadly representative of the mainstream Islamic view. Tabari also often cited conflicting versions of the same event when he is aware of them.

Al-Tabari focused on a limited number of themes relevant to his interests. Al-Tabari wrote extensively about the pre-Islamic history of Persia, but very little space about the histories of Ancient Greece or the Roman Empire. Likewise, significant space is devoted to recounting Old Testament history, but very little to the life of Jesus and narratives concerning the history of the Christian community. Much more attention is given to Iran and Iraq compared to Syria and Egypt. He devoted much more space to documenting political uprisings (even minor ones) and battles compared to more mundane but significant matters of everyday society such as taxation, commerce, industry, agriculture, and so forth. This selectivity is likely a product of a combination of al-Tabari's own interests as well as what sources of information were themselves able for access to al-Tabari as he composed his history.

Another feature of Al-Tabari's work was to introduce methods of hadith into it, meaning that he would supply isnads (chains of transmission) for the reports he mentions. This was important for the ta'rikh genre as it had, by then, been seen as lacking in rigor by Islamic scholars specialized in the hadith sciences (known as the muḥaddithūn). In one sense, Al-Tabari can be viewed as having combined the formats of khabar (report/account/narrative) and ḥadīth.

An appendix or continuation, was written by Abu Abdullah b. Ahmad b. Ja'far al-Farghani, a student of al-Tabari.

== Main episodes ==
Al-Tabari's history is presented as a master narrative or history from an Islamic point of view, ultimately dedicated to demonstrating that Islam is the true religion. The main episodes of Al-Tabari's master narrative are:

1. The creation of the world by God
2. The many prophets God sends to warn humanity
3. The history of the empires before Islam. Special focus on Iran.
4. Dedicated histories of the South Arabian kingdoms and northern Arabs pre-Islam. Focus on Mecca and the Quraysh.
5. A life of Muhammad.
6. The succession of caliphs (beginning with Abu Bakr) after the death of Muhammad.
7. The ridda wars (during the reign of Abu Bakr).
8. The early Islamic conquests during the reign of Umar and afterwards.
9. Early civil wars, especially those of Shiite and Khwarij groups.
10. The overthrow of the Rashidun Caliphate by the Umayyad Caliphate, followed by the overthrow of the Umayyad Caliphate by the Abbasid Caliphate
11. A history of Abbasid rule (including uprisings during this time)
12. The succession of governors, commanders, and other figures that represent the human embodiment of the Islamic tradition during this time

== Context ==
A number of other master narratives of pre-Islamic and Islamic history were written in the era of Al-Tabari. The most well-known is Ibn Ishaq's Al-Sirah al-Nabawiyyah, which largely focuses on the life of Muhammad. Another is the Kitab al-Maghazi of Al-Waqidi, the Kitab al-futuh (Book of Conquests) of Ibn A'tham al-Kufi, and the Futuh al-buldan of Al-Baladhuri. The Book of Idols of Ibn al-Kalbi focuses on the religious pre-Islamic history of Arabia. There was also one annalistic work predating that of Al-Tabari: the Ta'rikh Khalifa ibn Khayyat (d. 854). This work roughly uses the same outline/approach as does Al-Tabari, with the exception that it omits a discussion of pre-Islamic history. It is also much shorter in general than Al-Tabari's. Another known Ta'rikh is that of Al-Ya'qubi, which has a moderate Shiite orientation. Al-Ya'qubi covers some topics in more detail that are more briefly or not at all covered by Al-Tabari, including administration, and commentary on India, China, and Egypt. The Kitab al-ta'rikh of Ibn Habib (d. 852) covers early Islamic history with a focus on administrative matters. He also covers biographies of hadith scholars and the region of Al-Andalus. Other works to this effect were written as well.

== Sources ==
Tabari at times draws on the Syriac Julian Romance.

== List of books/volumes ==
- Vol. 01 General Introduction and from the Creation to the Flood (Franz Rosenthal)
- Vol. 02 Prophets and Patriarchs (William Brinner)
- Vol. 03 The Children of Israel (William Brinner)
- Vol. 04 The Ancient Kingdoms (Moshe Perlmann)
- Vol. 05 The Sassanids, the Byzantines, the Lakhmids, and Yemen (C. E. Bosworth)
- Vol. 06 Muhammad at Mecca (W. Montgomery Watt and M.V. McDonald)
- Vol. 07 The Foundation of the Community - Muhammad at al-Madina, A. D. 622-626 (M.V. McDonald)
- Vol. 08 The Victory of Islam (Michael Fishbein)
- Vol. 09 The Last Years of the Prophet: The Formation of the State, A.D. 630-632-A.H. 8-11 (Ismail Poonawala)
- Vol. 10 The Conquest of Arabia, A. D. 632-633 - A. H. 11 (Fred M. Donner)
- Vol. 11 The Challenge to the Empires (Khalid Blankinship)
- Vol. 12 The Battle of al-Qadisiyyah and the Conquest of Syria and Palestine (Yohanan Friedmann)
- Vol. 13 The Conquest of Iraq, Southwestern Persia, and Egypt: The Middle Years of 'Umar's Caliphate, A.D. 636-642-A.H. 15-21 (G.H.A. Juynboll)
- Vol. 14 The Conquest of Iran, A. D. 641-643 - A. H. 21-23 (G. Rex Smith)
- Vol. 15 The Crisis of the Early Caliphate: The Reign of Uthman, A. D. 644-656 - A. H. 24-35 (R. Stephen Humphreys)
- Vol. 16 The Community Divided: The Caliphate of Ali I, A. D. 656-657-A. H. 35-36 (Adrian Brockett)
- Vol. 17 The First Civil War: From the Battle of Siffin to the Death of Ali, A. D. 656-661-A. H. 36-40 (G. R. Hawting)
- Vol. 18 Between Civil Wars: The Caliphate of Mu'awiyah 40 A.H., 66 A.D.-60 A.H., 680 A.D. (Michael G. Morony)
- Vol. 19 The Caliphate of Yazid ibn Mu'awiyah, A. D. 680-683 - A. H. 60-64 (I. K. A. Howard)
- Vol. 20 The Collapse of Sufyanid Authority and the Coming of the Marwanids: The Caliphates of Mu'awiyah II and Marwan I (G. R. Hawting)
- Vol. 21 The Victory of the Marwanids, A. D. 685-693-A. H. 66-73 (Michael Fishbein)
- Vol. 22 The Marwanid Restoration: The Caliphate of 'Abd al-Malik: A.D. 693-701 - A.H. 74-81 (Everett K Rowson)
- Vol. 23 The Zenith of the Marwanid House: The Last Years of 'Abd al-Malik and the Caliphate of al-Walid A.D. 700-715-A.H. 81-95 (Martin Hinds)
- Vol. 24 The Empire in Transition: The Caliphates of Sulayman, 'Umar, and Yazid, A. D. 715-724-A. H. 96-105 (Stephan Powers)
- Vol. 25 The End of Expansion: The Caliphate of Hisham, A.D. 724-738-A.H. 105-120 (Khalid Blankinship)
- Vol. 26 The Waning of the Umayyad Caliphate: Prelude to Revolution, A.D. 738-744 - A.H. 121-126 (Carole Hillenbrand)
- Vol. 27 The Abbasid Revolution, A. D. 743-750 - A. H. 126-132 (John Alden Williams)
- Vol. 28 The Abbasid Authority Affirmed: The Early Years of al-Mansur (Jane Dammen McAuliffe)
- Vol. 29 Al-Mansur and al-Mahdi, A.D. 763-786-A.H. 146-169 (Hugh N. Kennedy)
- Vol. 30 The Abbasid Caliphate in Equilibrium: The Caliphates of Musa al-Hadi and Harun al-Rashid, A. D. 785-809 - A. H. 169-192 (C. E. Bosworth)
- Vol. 31 The War Between Brothers, A. D. 809-813 - A. H. 193-198 (Michael Fishbein)
- Vol. 32 The Absolutists in Power: The Caliphate of al-Ma'mun, A.D. 813-33 - A.H. 198-213 (C. E. Bosworth)
- Vol. 33 Storm and Stress Along the Northern Frontiers of the Abbasid Caliphate (C. E. Bosworth)
- Vol. 34 Incipient Decline: The Caliphates of al-Wathiq, al-Mutawakkil and al-Muntasir, A.D. 841-863-A.H. 227-248 (Joel L Kraemer)
- Vol. 35 The Crisis of the Abbasid Caliphate (George Saliba)
- Vol. 36 The Revolt of the Zanj, A. D. 869-879 - A. H. 255-265 (David Waines)
- Vol. 37 The Abbasid Recovery: The War Against the Zanj Ends (Philip M Fields)
- Vol. 38 The Return of the Caliphate to Baghdad: The Caliphate of al-Mu'tadid, al-Muktafi and al-Muqtadir, A.D. 892-915 (Franz Rosenthal)
- Vol. 39 Biographies of the Prophet's Companions and Their Successors: al-Tabari's Supplement to His History (Ella Landau-Tasseron)
- Vol. 40 Index (Prepared by Alex V Popovkin under the supervision of Everett K. Rowson)

== Editions ==
Editions include:

- An edition published under the editorship of M.J. de Goeje in three series comprising 13 volumes, with two extra volumes containing indices, introduction and glossary (Leiden, 1879–1901).
- An edition published under the editorship of Muhammad Abu al-Fadl Ibrahim (1905-1981) in 10 volumes (Cairo: Dar al-Ma'arif, 1960–1969.)
- A Persian digest of this work, made in 963 by the Samanid scholar al-Bal'ami, translated into French by Hermann Zotenberg (vols. i.-iv., Paris, 1867–1874).
- An English translation in 39 volumes (plus index), published by the State University of New York Press from 1985 through 2007. Various editors and 29 translators. ISBN 978-0-7914-7249-1 (hc), ISBN 978-0-7914-7250-7 (pb), Author: Tabari (various translators), Publisher: SUNY Press
- A recent abridged rendition of the entire work was published by Dr. Tahir Ridha Jaffer in 2025 in a single volume.

== See also ==
- Crowns from the Accounts of the Yemen and the Genealogies of Himyar
- The Book of Crowns on the Kings of Himyar
- History of al-Ya'qubi
- Jami' al-Tawarikh
- List of Muslim historians
- List of Sunni books
