= Gustav Weil =

German orientalist (1808-1889)

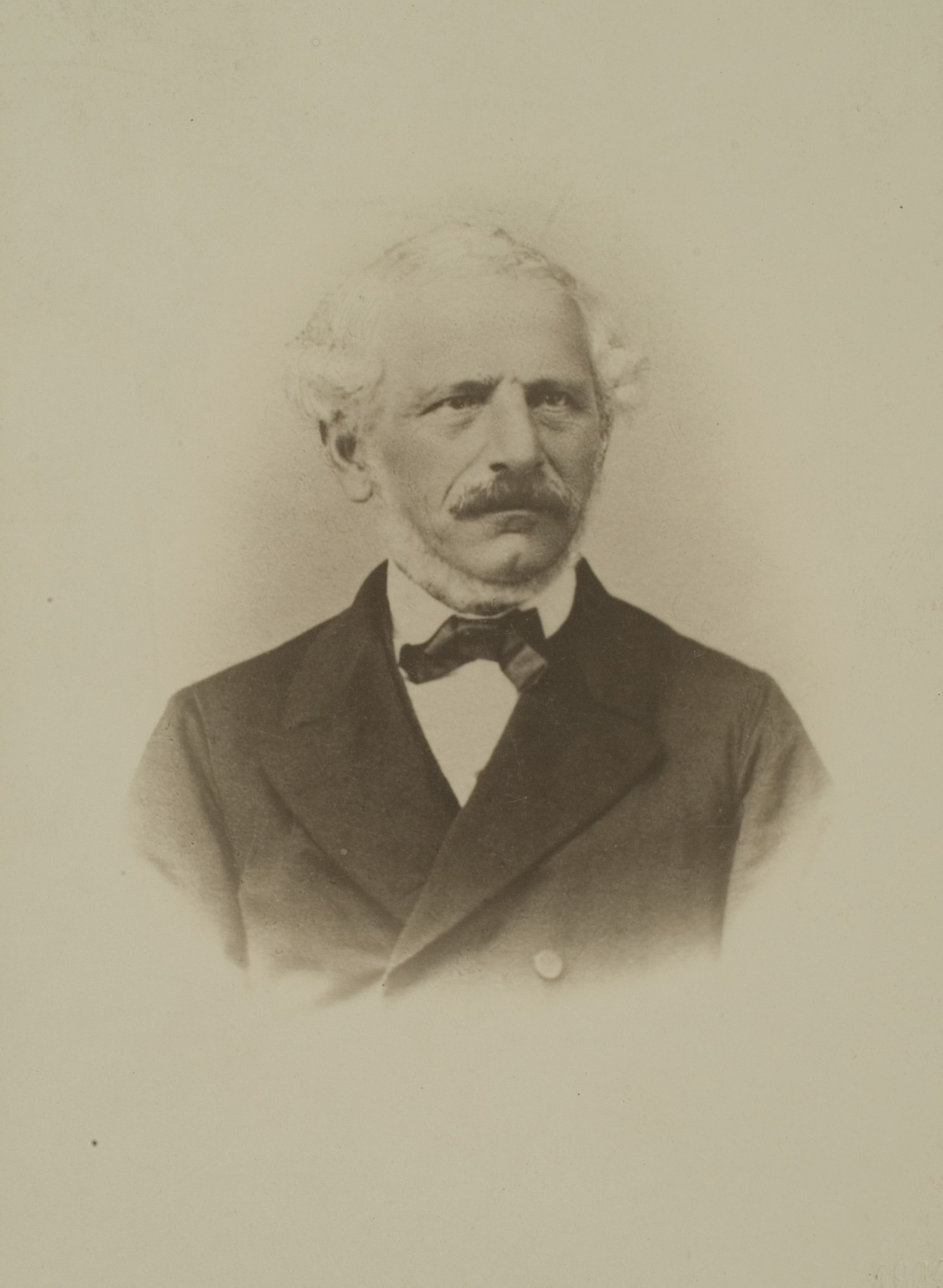
- Born: April 25, 1808; Sulzburg, Grand Duchy of Baden
- Died: August 29, 1889 (aged 81); Freiburg-im-Breisgau

Gustav Weil (25 April 1808 – 29 August 1889) was a German orientalist and one of the earliest academic practitioners of Quranic studies.

== Biography ==
Weil was born in Sulzburg, then part of the Grand Duchy of Baden.

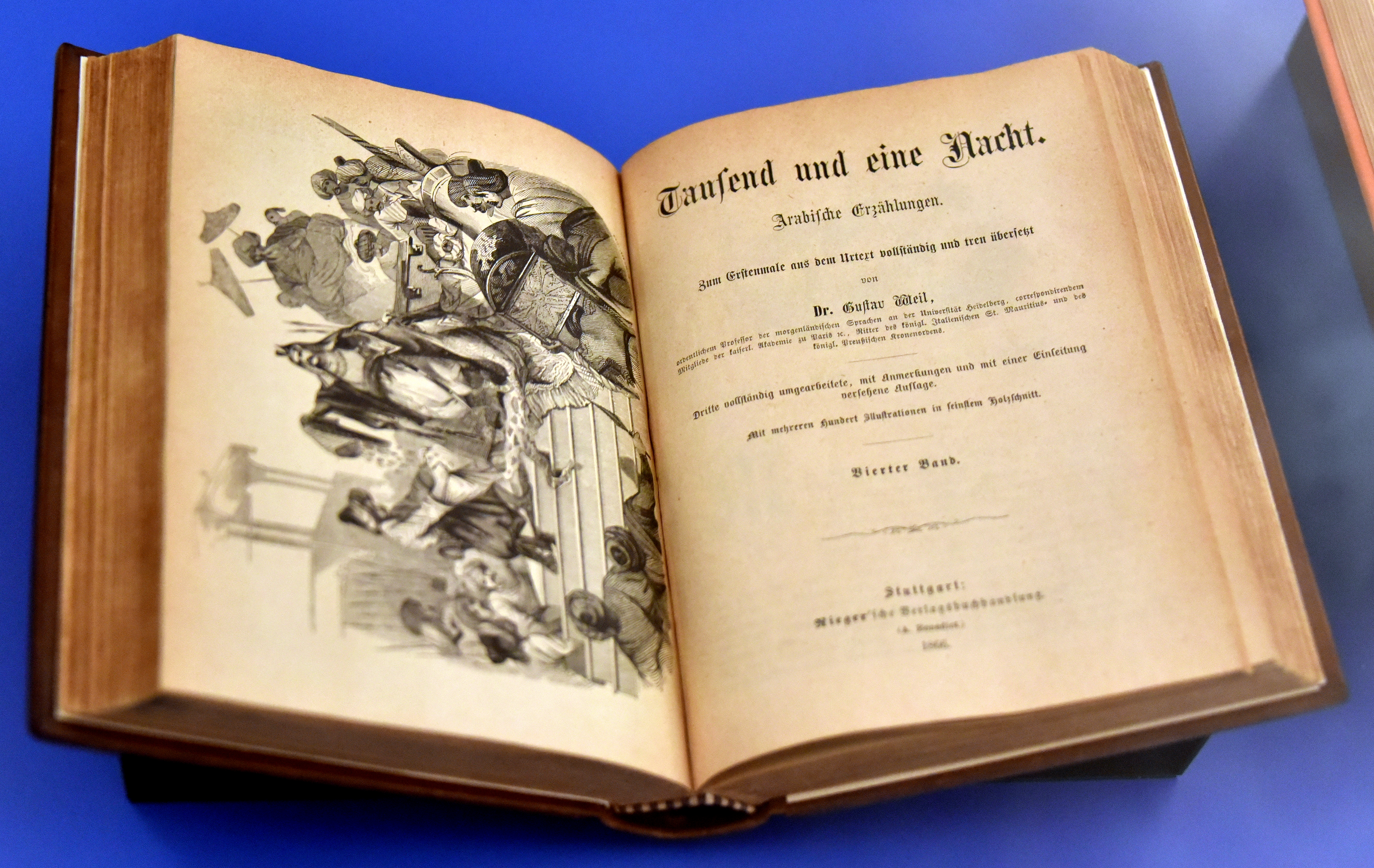
Arabian Nights, "Tausend und Eine Nacht, Arabische Erzählungen", translated into German by Gustav Weil, Vol .4, 1866 CE

Being destined for the rabbinate, he was taught Hebrew, as well as German and French; and he received instruction in Latin from the minister of his native town. At the age of twelve he went to Metz, where his grandfather was rabbi, to study the Talmud. For this, however, he developed very little taste, and he abandoned his original intention of entering upon a theological career. In 1828 he entered the University of Heidelberg, devoting himself to the study of philology and history; at the same time he studied Arabic under Umbreit. Though without means, he nevertheless went to study under De Sacy in Paris in 1830, and thence followed the French military expedition to Algiers, acting as correspondent at Algiers for the Augsburger Allgemeine Zeitung. He resigned from this position in January 1831 and journeyed to Cairo, where he was appointed instructor of French at the Egyptian Medical School of Abu-Zabel. He utilized the opportunity to study with the Arabic philologists Mohammed Ayyad al-Tantawi and Aḥmad al-Tunsi. Here also he acquired Neo-Persian and Turkish, and, save for a short interruption occasioned by a visit to Europe, he remained in Egypt till March 1835.

Weil returned to Europe by way of Constantinople, where he remained for some time pursuing Turkish studies. In Germany he sought permission to establish himself as privat-docent in the University of Heidelberg, receiving it, however, only after great difficulties. Weil had attacked Joseph von Hammer-Purgstall in a translation of Zamakhshari's Golden Necklaces (Stuttgart, 1836), and the faculty of Heidelberg, being unable to judge the matter, hesitated to appoint him docent because of Hammer-Purgstall's high reputation. De Sacy's recommendation opened the way to him, which, however, was destined to remain rough and rugged. He gained his livelihood as assistant librarian, and was appointed librarian in 1838, which position he retained till 1861; in that year he became professor.

At Stuttgart in 1837 Weil published Die Poetische Literatur der Araber, and later issued a translation of the Thousand and One Nights, the first complete translation from the original text into German (4 vols., 1837–41; 2d ed. 1866; 4th ed. 1871-72), which was, however, spoiled in the process of publication. Weil purposed to give a philologically exact version, which would have been highly desirable in many respects; but the Stuttgart publisher authorized August Lewald to change many objectionable passages, and thus made of it a popular and salable work. This perversion caused Weil much vexation. Weil's second great work was Mohammed, der Prophet (Stuttgart, 1843), a life of Mohammed, in the compilation of which he was the first to go back to the oldest accessible sources in Europe. It was not in his nature, however, to attempt a psychological reconstruction of the prophet's character, as was done later by Aloys Sprenger and Muir. Washington Irving in his Life of Mohammed used Weil's work as a source of information, and acknowledged his indebtedness to that author.

While pursuing these studies Weil published his Historisch-Kritische Einleitung in den Koran (Bielefeld and Leipsic, 1844 and 1878) as a supplement to Ullman's translation of the Koran, and the translation of one of the original sources of the biography of Mohammed, Leben Mohammed's nach Muhammed ibn Isḥaḳ, Bearbeitet von Abd el-Malik ibn Hischâm (Stuttgart, 2 vols., 1864). Three additional essays remain to be mentioned: one on Mohammed's epilepsy (Journal Asiatique, July, 1842); the second an investigation of a Supposed Lie of Mohammed (ib. May, 1849); and the third a discussion of the question whether Mohammed could read and write (Proceedings of the Congress of Orientalists at Florence, i. 357). To these must be added Biblische Legenden der Mohammedaner (Frankfurt, 1845), in which Weil argues the influence of the rabbinic legends upon the religion of Islam.

The most comprehensive work of Weil is his Geschichte der Chalifen (5 vols., Heidelberg and Stuttgart, 1846–51), which is virtually an elaboration of the original works of Muslim historians, whom he in large part studied from manuscripts; it treats also of the Egyptian and Spanish califates. This was followed by the Geschichte der Islamischen Völker von Mohammed bis zur Zeit des Sultans Selim. (Stuttgart, 1866), an introduction to the medieval history of the Orient. After 1866 Weil confined his literary activity to the publication of reviews in the Heidelberger Jahrbücher and in the Jenaische Litteratur-Zeitung. In later years he received honors from various states, including Baden and Prussia. Owing to continued illness he was pensioned in 1888. He was elected as a member to the American Philosophical Society in 1886.

Weil died at Freiburg-im-Breisgau in 1889. His collection of Arabic manuscripts was presented to the University of Heidelberg by his children.

== Works ==
=== English ===
- The Story of Ali Baba & the Forty Thieves: An Extract from Dr. Weil's German Translation of the Arabian Nights (1889)

=== German ===
- Die poetische Literatur der Araber vor und unmittelbar nach Mahommed (1837)
- Biblische Legenden der Muselmänner. Aus arabischen Quellen zusammengetragen und mit jüdischen Sagen verglichen (Frankfurt am Main: Rütten, 1845)
  - The Bible, the Koran, and the Talmud: or, Biblical Legends of the Mussulmans, Compiled from Arabic Sources, and Compared with Jewish Traditions (London: Longman, Brown, Green, and Longmans, 1846) (English translation)
  - Mohammedanernes Bibelske Legender, hendtede fra arabiske Kilder og sammenlignede med jødiske Sagn (1855) (Danish translation)
- Geschichte der islamitischen Völker von Mohammed bis zur Zeit des Sultan Selim (1866)
