= Sīrah =

Biographies of Muhammad

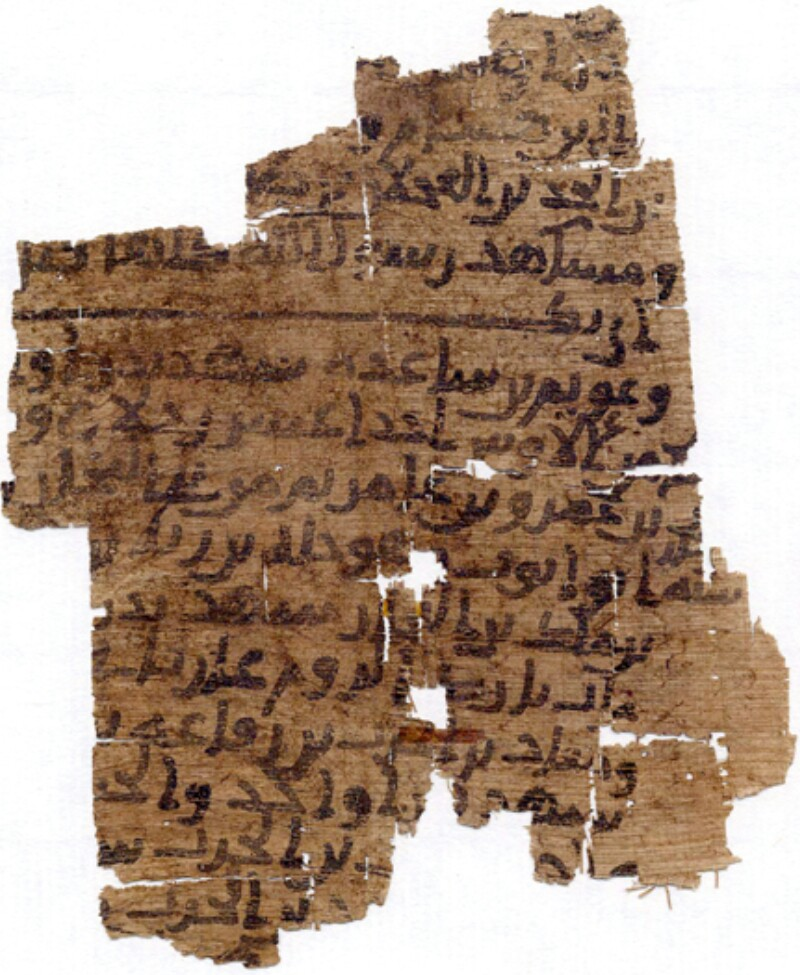
An early manuscript of Ibn Hisham's al-Sirah al-Nabawiyyah

Al-sīrah al-nabawiyya (Arabic: السيرة النبوية), commonly shortened to sīrah and translated as prophetic biography, are the traditional biographies of the Islamic prophet Muhammad written over centuries by Muslim historians, from which, in addition to the Quran and hadith literature, most historical information about his life and the early history of Islam is derived.

Early historiographic information in Islam emerged as the irregular products of storytellers (qass, pl. qussas)—they were quite prestigious then—without details. While the narratives were initially in the form of a kind of heroic epics called maghazi, details were added later, edited and transformed into sirah compilations. The stories were written in the form of "founding conquest stories" based on nostalgia for the golden age then. Humphrey, quoted by Antoine Borrut, explains that the stories related to this period were created according to a pact-betrayal-redemption principle. Western historians describe the purpose of these early biographies as largely to convey a message—of a hagiographic nature—rather than to strictly and accurately record history. Lawrence Conrad examines the early sirah books and sees that the dates of Muhammad's birth span a period of up to 85 years. Conrad defines this as: "the fluidity (evolutionary process) continued even in the written period." At the same time the study of the earliest periods in Islamic history is made difficult by a lack of sources.

From the very beginning, the process of creating the image of Muhammad as a warrior hero supported by divine help is seen as fitting the ideal hero typology and current needs during the military collapses experienced by the Umayyads. Muhammad's position gradually rose from his military stature to that of the sole and central figure in narratives who received divine assistance, in parallel with the rise in the value of the hadiths attributed to Muhammad in Islamic lawmaking although it was not like that in the beginning.

== Terminology ==
In the first two centuries of Islamic history, sīrah was more commonly known as maghāzī (literally, 'stories of military expeditions'), which is now considered to be only a subset of sīra—one that concerns the military campaigns of Muhammad. The phrase sīrat rasūl allāh, or as-sīra al-nabawiyya, refers to the study of the life of Muhammad. The term sīrah was first linked to the biography of Muhammad by Ibn Shihab al-Zuhri (d. 124/741–2), and later popularized by the work of Ibn Hisham (d. 833).

In the Arabic language the word sīrah or sīrat (Arabic: سيرة) comes from the verb sāra, which means "to travel" or "to be on a journey". A person's sīrah is that person's journey through life, or biography, encompassing their birth, events in their life, manners and characteristics, and their death. In modern usage it may also refer to a person's resume. It is sometimes written as "seerah", "sirah" or "sirat", all meaning "life" or "journey". In Islamic literature, the plural form, siyar, could also refer to the rules of war and dealing with non-Muslims.

Early works of sīrah consist of multiple historical reports called khabar. Sometimes the word tradition or hadith is used instead. In terms of structure, a hadith and a khabar are very similar; they both contain isnads (chains of transmission). The main difference between a hadith and a khabar is that a hadith is not concerned with an event as such, and normally does not specify a time or place. Rather the purpose of hadith is to record a religious doctrine as an authoritative source of Islamic law. By contrast, while a khabar may carry some legal or theological implications, its main aim is to convey information about a certain event. Some historians consider the sīrah and maghāzī literature to be a subset of Hadith.

== Evolution of content ==
The sīrah literature includes a variety of heterogeneous materials, containing mainly narratives of military expeditions undertaken by Muhammad and his companions. These stories are intended as historical accounts and are used for veneration. The sīrah also includes a number of written documents, such as political treaties (e.g., Treaty of Hudaybiyyah or Constitution of Medina), military enlistments, assignments of officials, letters to foreign rulers, and so forth. It also records some of the speeches and sermons made by Muhammad, like his speech at the Farewell Pilgrimage. Some of the sīrah accounts include verses of poetry commemorating certain events and battles.

Parts of sīrah were inspired by, or elaborate upon, events mentioned in the Quran. These parts were often used by writers of Tafsir and asbab al-nuzul to provide background information for events mentioned in certain ayat.

At a 2 to 3 hundred years later periods, certain type of stories included in sīrah developed into their own separate genres. One genre is concerned with stories of prophetic miracles, called aʿlām al-nubuwa (literally, "proofs of prophethood"—the first word is sometimes substituted for amārāt or dalāʾil). Another genre, called faḍāʾil wa mathālib—tales that show the merits and faults of individual companions, enemies, and other notable contemporaries of Muhammad. Some works of sīrah also positioned the story of Muhammad as part of a narrative that includes stories of earlier prophets, Persian Kings, pre-Islamic Arab tribes, and the Rashidun.

It can also be considered that the changes in the content of the Sira followed a course parallel to the replacement of the Sunnah (which initially meant only tradition), which was a valid argument for legitimacy in Islamic society, with the Sunnah of Muhammad and the Hadith of Muhammad which were considered more valuable, and the divine revelation of Muhammad becoming the most important source of Islamic lawsmaking.

== Reliability ==
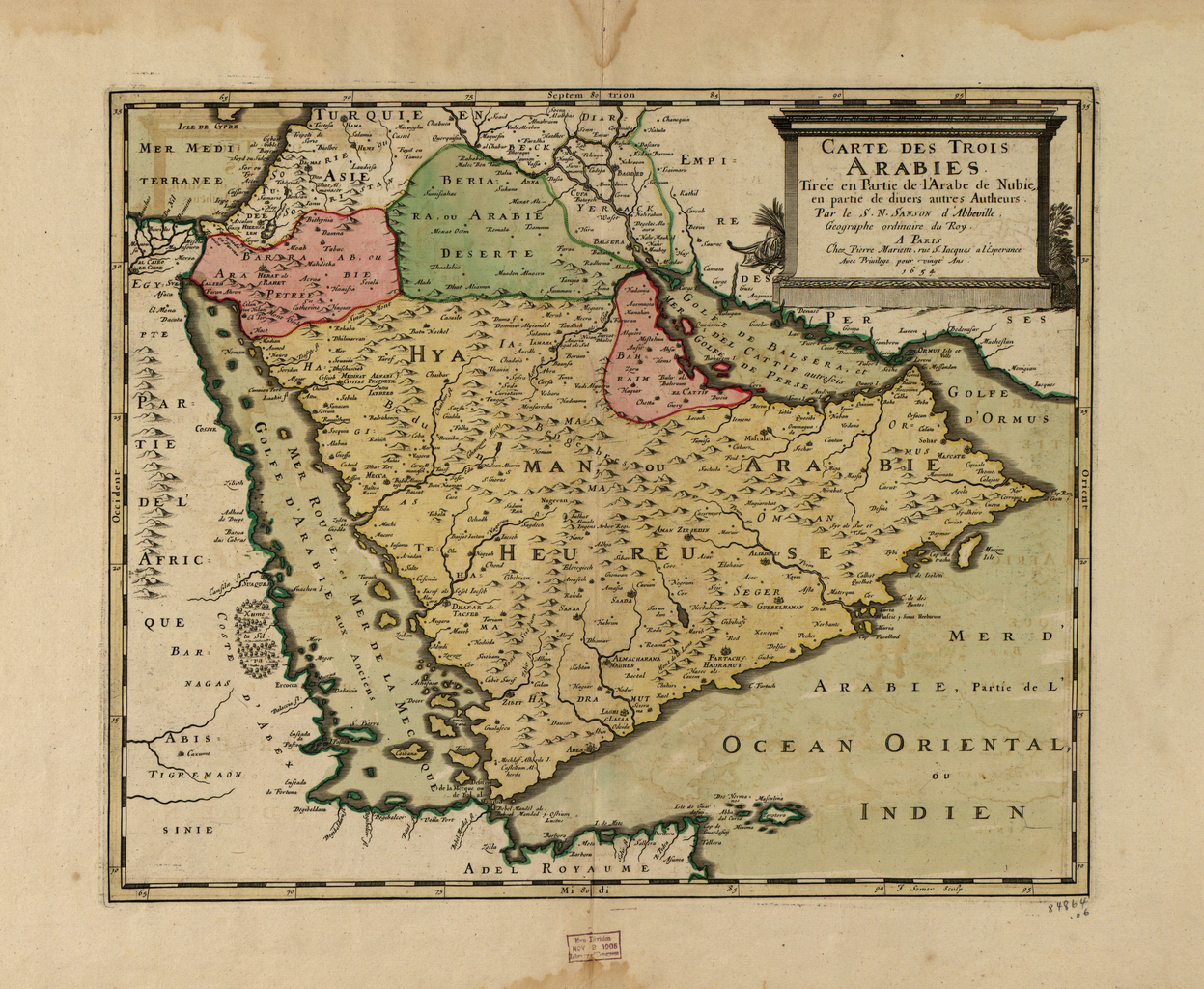
Non-Islamic testimonies about Muhammad's life describe him as the leader of the Saracens, believed to be descendants of Ishmael.

For centuries, Muslim scholars have recognized the problem of authenticity of hadith. Thus they have developed sophisticated methods (see Hadith studies) of evaluating isnāds (chains of transmission). This was done in order to classify each hadith into "sound" (ṣaḥīḥ) for authentic reports, as opposed to "weak" (ḍaʿīf) for ones that are probably fabricated, in addition to other categories. Since many sīrah reports also contain isnād information and some of the sīrah compilers (akhbārīs) were themselves practicing jurists and hadīth transmitters (muḥaddiths), it was possible to apply the same methods of hadīth criticism to the sīrah reports. However, some sīrah reports were written using an imprecise form of isnād, or what modern historians call the "collective isnād" or "combined reports". The use of collective isnād meant that a report may be related on the authority of multiple persons without distinguishing the words of one person from another. This lack of precision led some hadith scholars to take any report that used a collective isnād to be lacking in authenticity.

According to Wim Raven, it is often noted that a coherent image of Muhammad cannot be formed from the literature of sīra, whose authenticity and factual value have been questioned on a number of different grounds. He lists the following arguments against the authenticity of sīra, followed here by counter arguments:

1. Hardly any sīrah work was compiled during the first century of Islam. However, Fred Donner points out that the earliest historical writings about the origins of Islam first emerged in AH 60–70, well within the first century of Hijra (see list of biographies of Muhammad). Furthermore, the sources now extant, dating from the second, third, and fourth centuries AH, are mostly compilations of material derived from earlier sources.
2. The many discrepancies exhibited in different narrations found in sīrah works. Yet, despite the lack of a single orthodoxy in Islam, there is still a marked agreement on the most general features of the traditional origins story.
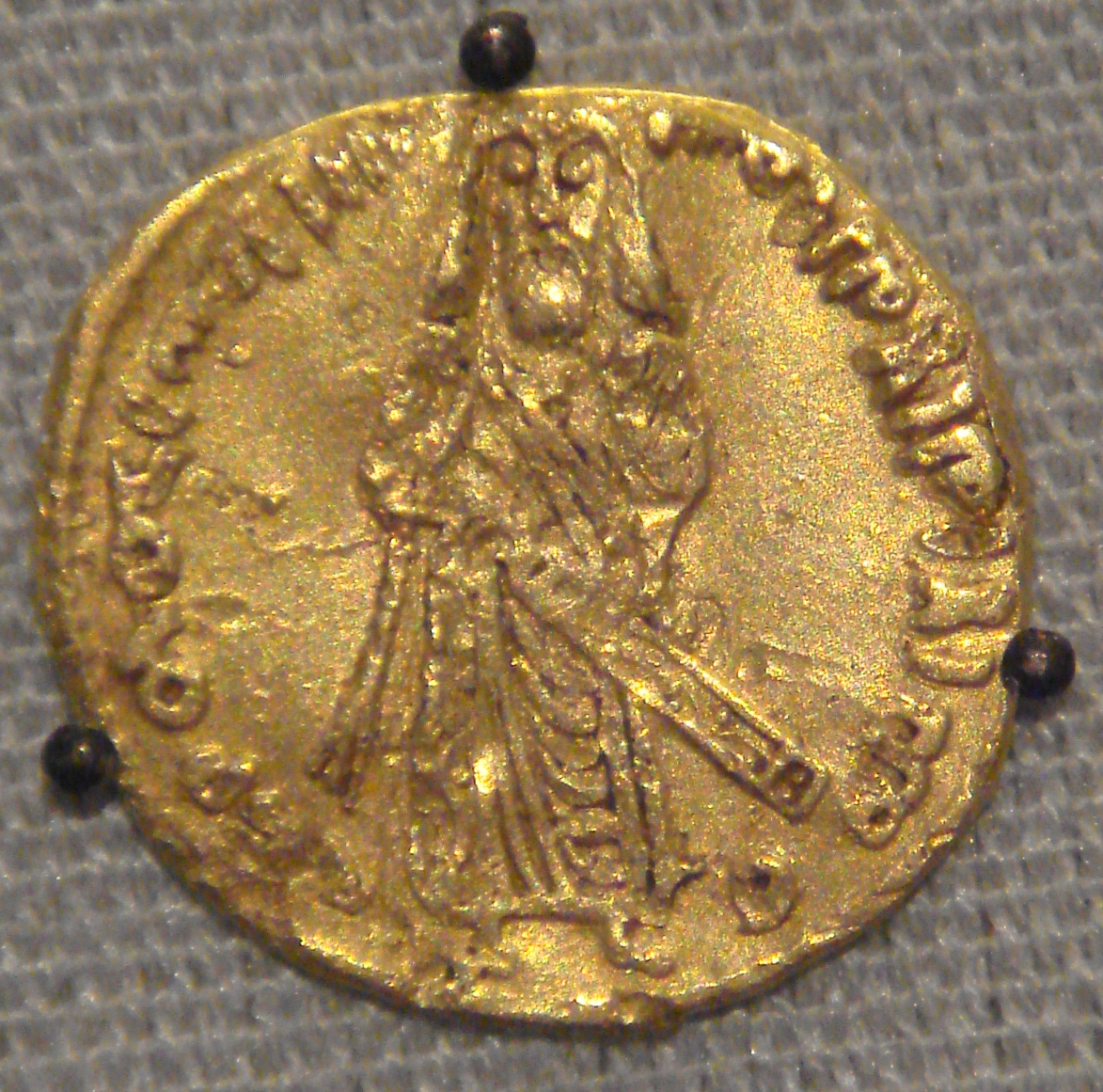
  Gold dinar minted by the Umayyads in 695, which likely depicts Abd al-Malik. (Note: The general view among historians and numismatists is that the human figure depicted in the coins minted by Abd al-Malik between 693 and 697, which have come to be known as the "standing caliph" issue, represent Abd al-Malik.) The historian Robert Hoyland, however, argues that this may be a near-contemporary depiction of Muhammad.
3. Later sources claiming to know more about the time of Muhammad than earlier ones. Scholar Patricia Crone found a pattern, where the farther a commentary was removed in time from the life of Muhammad and the events in the Quran, the more information it provided, despite the fact it depended on the earlier sources for its content. Crone attributed this phenomenon to storytellers' embellishment.
  If one storyteller should happen to mention a raid, the next storyteller would know the date of this raid, while the third would know everything that an audience might wish to hear about.
  In the case of Ibn Ishaq, there are no earlier sources we can consult to see if and how much embroidering was done by him and other earlier transmitters, but, Crone argues, "it is hard to avoid the conclusion that in the three generations between the Prophet and Ibn Ishaq" fictitious details were not also added.
4. Discrepancies compared to non-Muslim sources. But there are also similarities and agreements both in information specific to Muhammad, and concerning Muslim tradition at large.
5. Some parts or genres of sīra, namely those dealing with miracles, do not qualify as sources for scientific historiographical information about Muhammad, except for showing the beliefs and doctrines of his community.

Islamic tradition traces the lineage of the Islamic prophet Muhammad back to the Adnani branch of the Arabs, through the Hashim family and the Quraysh tribe. (Note: Wathilah ibn al-Asqa narrated that Muhammad said "Indeed Allah chose Isma'il from the progeny of Ibrahim, chose the Banu Kinanah over other tribes from the children of Isma'il; He chose the Banu Quraish over other tribes of Kinanah; He chose Banu Hashim over the other families of the Quraish; and He chose me from Banu Hashim.") And, Muhammad is believed to be descended from Ishmael, the son of Abraham, through the Hashim tribe who are considered prophets in Islam, a biblical figure; however, neither Abraham nor Ishmael's existence has been independently corroborated by historians. Modern historians don't take the Family tree as a fact. In the pre-Islamic (and early Islamic) period, genealogical trees were a product of the oral tradition of the Days of the Arabs, shaped according to social needs and the interests of the listeners. Contemporary historiography unveiled the lack of inner coherence of this genealogical system and demonstrated that it finds insufficient matching evidence; the distinction between Qahtanites and Adnanites is believed to be a product of the Umayyad Age, when the war of factions (al-niza al-hizbi) was raging in the young Islamic Empire.

Nevertheless, other content of sīra, like the Constitution of Medina, are generally considered to be authentic, the context, nature of the language, and other important details which reflect its validity often being cited.

=== Reception ===
During the early centuries of Islam, the sīrah literature was taken less seriously compared to the hadiths. Today, although the orthodox Islamic approach frequently uses sīrah material in its sermons, Quranism and the academic community approach this material with suspicion. While Yaşar Nuri Öztürk notes that the hadiths, which have now reached millions, were initially limited to a few hundred, Mehmet Özdemir draws attention to the almost non-existent number of miracles (dalāʾil al-nubuwwa) in the first records and the hundreds of additions made in later periods.

Many Western scholars suspect that there was widespread fabrication of hadith—either entirely or by the misattribution of the views of early Muslim religious and legal thinkers to Muhammad—in the early centuries of Islam to support certain theological and legal positions. In addition to fabrication, it is possible for the meaning of a hadith to have greatly drifted from its original telling through the different interpretations and biases of its varying transmitters, even if the chain of transmission is authentic. While some hadith may genuinely originate from firsthand observation of Muhammad (particularly personal traits that were not of theological interest, like his fondness for tharid and sweets), Western scholars suggest that it is extraordinarily difficult if not impossible to determine which hadith accurately reflect the historical Muhammad.

More recently, western historical criticism and debate concerning sīrah have elicited a defensive attitude from some Muslims who wrote apologetic literature defending its content.

== Early compilations of sīra ==
The following is a list of some of the early Hadith collectors who specialized in collecting and compiling sīrah and maghāzī reports:

- ʿUrwa ibn al-Zubayr (d. 713). He wrote letters replying to inquiries of the Umayyad caliphs, Abd al-Malik ibn Marwan and al-Walid I, involving questions about certain events that happened in the time of Muhammad. Since Abd al-Malik did not appreciate the maghāzī literature, these letters were not written in story form. He is not known to have written any books on the subject.
- Wahb ibn Munabbih (d. during 725 to 737). Several books were ascribed to him but none of them are now extant. Some of his works survive as quotations found in works by Ibn Ishaq, Ibn Hisham, Ibn Jarir al-Tabari, and Abū Nuʿaym al-Iṣfahānī.
- Ibn Shihāb al-Zuhrī (d. c. 737), a central figure in sīrah literature, who collected both ahadith and akhbār. His akhbār also contain chains of transmissions, or isnad. He was sponsored by the Umayyad court and asked to write two books, one on genealogy and another on maghāzī. The first was canceled and the one about maghāzī is either not extant or has never been written.
- Musa ibn ʿUqba, a student of al-Zuhrī, wrote Kitāb al-Maghāzī, a notebook used to teach his students. The work was lost but a manuscript of Kitab al-maghazi was recently rediscovered. Some of his traditions have been preserved, although their attribution to him is disputed.
- Muhammad ibn Ishaq (d. 767 or 761), another student of al-Zuhrī, who collected oral traditions that formed the basis of an important biography of Muhammad. His traditions survived through a number of sources, most notably Ibn Hisham and Ibn Jarir al-Tabari.

== Statistics ==
The sīrah literature is important: in the Urdu language alone, a scholar from Pakistan in 2024 produced a bibliography of more than 10,000 titles, counting multivolume works as a single book and without integrating articles, short essays and unpublished manuscripts, with the researcher also precising that the literature in Arabic is even more important.

== See also ==
- Glossary of Islam
- Outline of Islam
- Index of Islam-related articles
- Depictions of Muhammad
- Historiography of early Islam
- List of hadith collections
- Biographical evaluation (ʿIlm al-rijāl)
- Sunnah

== Bibliography ==
- Brown, Jonathan A.C. (2009). Hadith: Muhammad's Legacy in the Medieval and Modern World (Foundations of Islam). Oneworld Publications. ISBN 978-1851686636.
- Donner, Fred McGraw (May 1998). Narratives of Islamic Origins: The Beginnings of Islamic Historical Writing. Darwin Press, Incorporated. ISBN 0878501274.
- Donner, Fred M. (2010). "Modern approaches to early Islamic history". In Robinson, Chase F. (ed.). The New Cambridge History of Islam. Vol. 1: The Formation of the Islamic World, Sixth to Eleventh Centuries. Cambridge University Press. pp. 625–47. ISBN 978-0-521-83823-8.
- Humphreys, R. Stephen (1991). Islamic History: A framework for Inquiry (Revised ed.). Princeton University Press. ISBN 0-691-00856-6.
- Toral-Niehoff, Isabel (2021). "Talking about Arab Origins: The Transmission of the ayyām al-ʿarab in Kūfa, Baṣra and Baghdād" (PDF). In Scheiner, J.; Janos, D. (eds.). The Place to Go Contexts of Learning in Baghdād, 750-1000 C.E. Darwin Press. pp. 43–69.
- Vansina, Jan (1985). Oral Tradition as History. James Currey Publishers. ISBN 978-0852550076.
