= Ibn Hisham =

Muslim scholar and historian (died 833)

- بن هشام

Personal life
- Died: 7 May 833/13 Rabīʿ II 218
- Era: Abbasid era
- Region: Basra and Egypt
- Main interest: Prophetic biography
- Notable work: The Life of the Prophet

Religious life
- Religion: Islam

Muslim leader
- Influenced by: Ibn Ishaq

Abū Muḥammad ʿAbd al-Malik ibn Hishām ibn Ayyūb al-Ḥimyarī (Arabic: أبو محمد عبد الملك ابن هشام بن أيوب الحميري; died 7 May 833), known simply as Ibn Hisham, was a 9th-century Abbasid historian and scholar, known for authoring the Al-Sirah al-Nabawiyyah. He grew up in Basra, in modern-day Iraq and later moved to Egypt.

== Life ==
Ibn Hisham has been said to have grown up in Basra and moved afterwards to Egypt. His family was native to Basra but he himself was born in Old Cairo. He gained a name as a grammarian and student of language and history in Egypt. His family was of Himyarite origin and belonged to Banu Ma‘afir tribe of Yemen.

== Biography of Muḥammad ==
As-Sīrah an-Nabawiyyah (السيرة النبوية), 'The Life of the Prophet'; is an edited recension of Ibn Isḥāq's classic Sīratu Rasūli l-Lāh (سيرة رسول الله) 'The Life of God's Messenger'. Ibn Isḥāq's now lost work survives only in Ibn Hishām's and al-Tabari's recensions, although fragments of several others survive, and Ibn Hishām and al-Tabarī share virtually the same material.

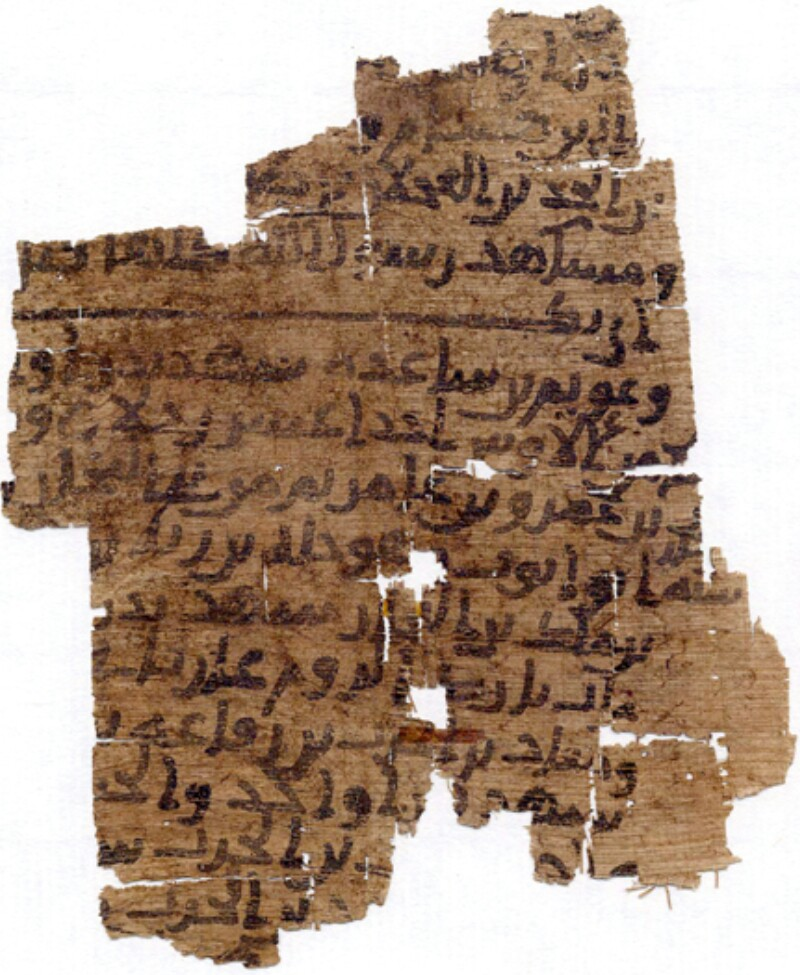
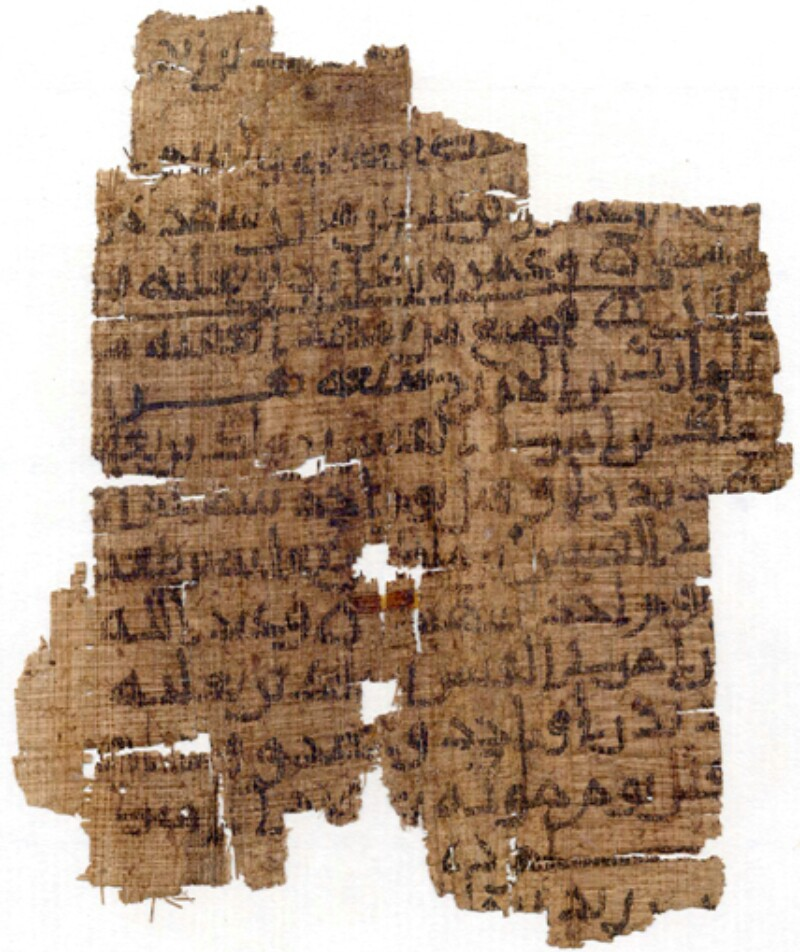
PERF No. 665: The earliest extant manuscript of The Sirah Of Prophet Muḥammad by Ibn Hishām. This manuscript is believed to be transmitted by students of Ibn Hishām (d. 218 AH /834 CE), perhaps soon after his death.

Ibn Hishām explains in the preface of the work, the criteria by which he made his choice from the original work of Ibn Isḥāq in the tradition of his disciple Ziyād al-Baqqāʾi (d. 799). Accordingly, Ibn Hishām omits stories from Al-Sīrah that contain no mention of Muḥammad, certain poems, traditions whose accuracy Ziyād al-Baqqāʾi (Note: Ziyād al-Baqqāʾi (d. 183/799), lived mostly in Kufa. Ibn Hishām's knowledge of Ibn Isḥāq's biography derived from al-Baqqāʾi.) could not confirm, and offensive passages that could offend the reader. Al-Tabari includes controversial episodes of the Satanic Verses including an apocryphal story about Muḥammad's attempted suicide. Ibn Hishām gives more accurate versions of the poems he includes and supplies explanations of difficult terms and phrases of the Arabic language, additions of genealogical content to certain proper names, and brief descriptions of the places mentioned in Al-Sīrah. Ibn Hishām appends his notes to the corresponding passages of the original text with the words: "qāla Ibn Hishām" (Ibn Hishām says).

=== Translations and editions ===
Later Ibn Hishām's As-Sira would chiefly be transmitted by his pupil, Ibn al-Barqī. This treatment of Ibn Ishāq's work was circulated to scholars in Cordoba in Islamic Spain by around 864. The first printed edition was published in Arabic by the German orientalist Ferdinand Wüstenfeld, in Göttingen (1858-1860). The Life of Moḥammad According to Moḥammed b. Ishāq, ed. 'Abd al-Malik b. Hisham. Gustav Weil (Stuttgart 1864) was the first published translation.

In the 20th century the book has been printed several times in the Middle East. The German orientalist Gernot Rotter produced an abridged (about one third) German translation of The life of the Prophet. As-Sīra An-Nabawīya. (Spohr, Kandern in the Black Forest 1999). In 1955, the British orientalist Alfred Guillaume published an English translation with Oxford University Press titled The Life of Muhammad: A Translation of Isḥāq's Sīrat Rasūl Allāh.

== Other works ==
Ibn Hisham also known as the author of the commentaries of The Book of Crowns on the Kings of Himyar. Ibn Hisham reported that he acquired the book narrative from 'Abd al-Mun'im Idris. (Note: ‘Abd al-Mun’im ibn Idris ibn Sinan were acknowledged as author of Hadith chain traditions and lores. He gained notoriety for being trustworthy that various Hadith scholars such as Ahmad ibn Hanbal, al-Daraqutni, Ali ibn al-Madini and Abu Zur’ah deemed him as liar and weak as narrator.) Ibn Hisham, who authored the commentaries of this book, also gave his own analysis that the Yemen region name were given from their primordial founder, Ya'rub (son of Qahtan), who also known by his other name, "Yaman".

== Published editions ==
=== English ===
- Al falah foundation. Cairo, Egypt. online link

=== Arabic ===
- online link

== Other works ==
- Kitab al-Tijan li ma'rifati muluk al-zamān fi akhbar Qahtān (كتاب التيجان لمعرفة ملوك الزمان في أخبار قحطان) 'The Book of Crowns, on the kings of yesteryear in the accounts of the Qahtān' (in Arabic); a genealogical work with historico-legendary accounts of the southern Arabs and their monuments in pre-Islamic times.

== See also ==
- Prophetic biography
- List of biographies of Muhammad
- List of Islamic scholars

=== External links ===
- Biodata from Arees Institute
- The earliest biography of Muhammad, by ibn Ishaq in English
- Bibliography at Goodreads
