= The Book of Crowns on the Kings of Himyar =

Biography of the kings of the Himyarite Kingdom

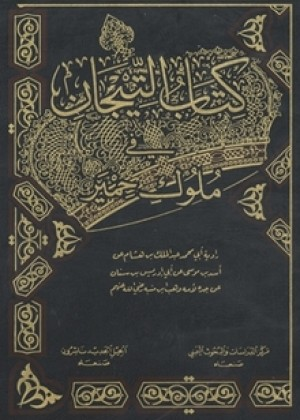
- Cover of the book
- Author: Ibn Hisham and Wahb ibn Munabbih
- Original title: التيجان في ملوك حمير
- Language: Arabic
- Genre: Early Islamic history, Arabian Jewish History, Biographical works
- Publication date: First Edition published in 1929
- Original text: التيجان في ملوك حمير at Arabic Wikisource
- Translation: The Book of Crowns on the Kings of Himyar at Wikisource

Kitāb al-Tījān (Arabic: كتاب التيجان) also known more commonly as The Book of Crowns on the Kings of Himyar, is a historical and biographical work created in its current form by Ibn Hisham, who also worked on the famous biography of Muhammad. Ibn Hisham attributes the work to the earlier Yemeni historian Wahb ibn Munabbih, an 8th AD century Israʼiliyyat author, and reports that he acquired the book's narratives from 'Abd al-Mun'im ibn Idris. (Note: ‘Abd al-Mun’im ibn Idris ibn Sinan were acknowledged as author of Hadith chain traditions and lores. he is gained notoriety for being untrustworthy that various Hadith scholars such as Ahmad ibn Hanbal, al-Daraqutni, Ali ibn al-Madini and Abu Zur’ah deemed him as liar and weak as narrator.)

The book is also known as Kitāb al-Tījān li ma'rifati muluk al-zamān fi akhbar Qahtān (The Book of Crowns, on the kings of yesteryear in the accounts of the Qahtānites).

== Manuscripts and editions ==
The only published edition of the Kitab al-Tijan was published in 1928 by Zayn al-ʿĀbidīn al-Mūsawī and it was later improved by Fritz Krenkow. At the time, only three manuscripts of the text were known from Sanaa, Yemen, all of which were imperfect copies of a common and earlier, but lost, manuscript. Later, another three manuscripts were found, but they differ significantly from earlier manuscripts and the published edition.

The earliest complete manuscript was produced in 1233 CE.

== Content ==
The book focuses on biographies, as well as the genealogy and ancestry of the rulers of the Himyarite Kingdom.

Included in the book is a study of the genealogy of the descendants of Ham, son of Biblical Noah, which the book describe as progenitor of Habesha peoples or Ethiopian peoples. In this topic, Wahb also narrated the story of how the South Arabian king Sayf ibn Dhi Yazan had fought against the presence of Habesha peoples in the Arabian peninsula since the 6th century AD.

The book also discusses the identity of Dhu al-Qarnayn, whom is identified as being of Byzantine ancestry. However, Ibn Hisham also gives his own personal commentary stating that Dhu al-Qarnayn was one of the Tababi'ah (plural of Tubba', the ruling title of the Himyarites), with the name of Sa'b ibn al-Harith (otherwise known as Sa'b Dhu Marathid). Dhu al-Qarnayn is also attributed with the action of conquering parts of the Iberian Peninsula.

=== Commentaries ===
Ibn Hisham, who authored the commentaries of this book, also gave his own analysis that the name of Yemen were given from their primordial founder, Ya'rub ibn Qahtan, who is also known by his other name, "Yaman".

Modern historian Jan Retsö has suggested that the commentaries of Ibn Hisham have shown that there was interest from Muslim orthodoxy in his era to preserve the historiography of Yemeni tradition.

Modern historians have said that some entries and stories in the book, are, however, legendary in nature and may not reflect reality.

=== List of kings mentioned in the book ===
The book structures mainly examines the descendants of South Arabian patriarch Qahtan. Below is a list of kings mentioned in the book, in order:

1. Malik al-Himyar, the son of Sheba
2. Wa'il ibn Himyar
3. Saksak ibn Wa'il
4. Ya'fur ibn Saksak
5. 'Amir Dhu Ra'ish
6. Al-Ma'afir ibn Ya'fur
7. Shaddad ibn Aad
8. Luqman ibn Aad
9. Dhu Shaddad al-Himaal ibn Aad
10. Al-Harith ibn al-Himaal
11. Sa'b Dhu Marathid (Dhul Qarnayn)
12. Abrahah Dhu'l Manar
13. 'Abd ibn Abrahah ibn Ra'ish
14. 'Amr ibn Abrahah ibn Ra'ish
15. Shurahil
16. Al-Hudhad ibn Shurahil
17. Queen of Sheba
18. Rehoboam
19. Malik ibn 'Amr ibn Ya'fur
20. Shammar Yahri'sh
21. Safi' ibn Shammar, the king of the Nabataeans
22. 'Amr ibn 'Amr Mazikiyah
23. The first king of the Ghassanids
24. Rabia ibn Nasr
25. Abu Karib
26. Hassan Yuha'min
27. Sharhabil Yafar (known here as 'Amr ibn Tubba' al-As'ad)
28. 'Abd-Kulal
29. Sharhabil Yakkuf (known here as Tubba' bin Hassan)
30. Rabia, son of Marthad ibn 'Abd-Kulal
31. Hassan ibn 'Amr ibn Tubba'
32. Abraha, son of Al-Sabbah (not Abraha al-Ashram)
33. Dhu Shanatir
34. Dhu Nuwas
35. Abraha
36. Yaksum ibn Abraha
37. Sayf ibn Dhi Yazan

== See also ==
- Al-Sirah al-Nabawiyyah (Ibn Ishaq)
- Book of Idols
- Book of the Himyarites, a Syriac Christian biographical work about the Himyarite Kingdom and its adoption of Judaism
- Crowns from the Accounts of the Yemen and the Genealogies of Himyar (Al-Hamdani)
- History of the Prophets and Kings
- Tarikh al-Tabari
