= Dhu Shanatir =

Hemyarite king

- King of Himyar
- Reign: 490–517
- Predecessor: Sharhabil Ya'fur
- Successor: Dhu Nuwas
- Died: c. 517
Names
- Arabic: لخنيعة ينوف ذو شناتر, romanized: Lakhniʿah Yanuf Dhu Shanatir
Regnal name
- Ma'dikarib Ya'fur (disputed)
- Religion: South Arabian polytheism

Dhu Shanatir, full name Lakhni'ah Yanuf Dhu Shanatir (Arabic: لخنيعة ينوف ذو شناتر) was a semi-legendary Himyarite king who ruled Yemen for at least 27 years. A usurper to the throne who was unrelated to the royal family of Himyar, Dhu Shanatir has sometimes been identified with the Aksumite vassal over Yemen, Ma'dikarib Ya'fur.

== Names ==
His epithet Dhu Shanatir means "The Man with Earrings" in Arabic. However, Ibn Hisham disagreed and stated that the word Shanatir means "fingers" in the Himyaritic language. Dhu Shanatir is sometimes romanized as Zu Shenatir. The name Lakhni'ah Yanuf is a common name amongst the Himyarite kings; a Himyarite prince and son of the king Sharhabil Yakkuf held the same name. A second Lakhni'ah Yanuf is also visible in inscriptions from the court during the reign of Marthad'ilan Yanuf.

== Reign ==
According to the Arab historians, Lakhni'ah Yanuf Dhu Shanatir took power in at least 490 CE following a period of internal dissent caused by the death of the last Himyarite king Sharhabil Ya'fur. His rule was described as cruel and oppressive, earning him the hatred of the local population. Dhu Shanatir was known to have been extremely rude and vile mannered towards the remaining Himyarite princes. His rule ended around 517 CE when Zur'ah (the real name of Dhu Nuwas, according to the Arab historians) stabbed him to death.

=== Death ===
Ibn Ishaq narrates that Lakhni'ah Yanuf Dhu Shanatir had a habit of inviting younger boys to his palace before sodomizing them. This dishonoured his victims, ensuring they would not rule after him. Dhu Shanatir then came to the last of the Himyarite princes, Zur'ah, and invited him to his castle. Zur'ah, who knew of Dhu Shanatir's exploits, hid a dagger in his shoe and set off to the palace; as Dhu Shanatir pounced upon him in the bedroom of the palace, Zur'ah stabbed Dhu Shanatir to death with the dagger. Zur'ah then cut off Dhu Shanatir's head and displayed it from the palace balcony. As the people of Himyar saw this, they cheered for Zur'ah and appointed him as leader as a reward for getting rid of the tyrannical leader who oppressed them, a move which the guards of Dhu Shanatir themselves supported. Zur'ah would take the title of Dhu Nuwas and then ascend the Himyarite throne for a few more years.

== Historicity ==
The historicity of Lakhni'ah Yanuf Dhu Shanatir was questioned by some historians including Ehsan Yar-Shater. Furthermore, historical inscriptions attest that a king named Ma'dikarib Ya'fur (who was also not from the royal family of Himyar and was appointed by the Aksumite Empire) took the throne directly before Dhu Nuwas. The historians Franz Altheim and Ruth Stehl, in their work Die Araber in der alten Welt, resolved this issue by proposing the theory that Ma'dikarib Ya'fur was merely a regnal name Lakhni'ah Yanuf Dhu Shanatir took up when he usurped the throne.

== See also ==
- Sa'b Dhu Marathid
- Abrahah Dhu'l Manar
- Sharhabil Ya'fur
- List of rulers of Saba and Himyar
