= 'Abd-Kulal =

Regent and governor of Himyar (died c. 500)

'Abd-Kulāl al-Ḥimyarī
- Maqawil (prince)
- Reign: c. 457
- Born: c. Late 4th century Yemen
- Died: c. 500–504
Names
- 'Abd-Kulāl ibn Muthāwwīb al-Ḥimyarī
- Religion: Christianity (non-trinitarian)

'Abd-Kulāl al-Ḥimyarī (Arabic: عبد كلال الحميري), or simply 'Abdkulāl or 'Abd-kalal, was a governor of Himyar who lived in the 5th century CE. He was a convert to Nontrinitarianism, but kept his religious beliefs confidential. 'Abd-Kulal also held the power of regent rule temporarily during his time in office.

== Name ==
The historians attested his name as 'Abd-Kulāl ibn Muthāwwīb al-Ḥimyarī. The first part of his name is sometimes romanized as 'Abdkulāl or 'Abd-kalal. As for his epithet, he was said to have been from the Dhu Harith tribe, rendering his full name as 'Abd-Kulāl ibn Muthāwwīb Dhū Harīth al-Ḥimyarī. However, he has also been attributed to being from the tribe of Dhū Rūayn. Ibn Hisham narrates that he was named 'Abd-Kulal ibn Yanuf.

== Reign ==
After the death of Sharhabil Ya'fur, the royal power was unstable as all the Himyarite princes were too young to rule except for Sharhabil Yakkuf who was suffering from mental issues. 'Abd-Kulal took the royal power out of fear that it would be usurped by outsiders of non-royal lineage. His reign was generally a peaceful one, and he was not fond of leading invasions and conquests.

'Abd-Kulal also built a residence for himself and his wife around the year 463 CE, which is attested in archaeological inscriptions dating to approximately that year.

== Family ==
Based on the inscriptions, 'Abd-Kulal had two sons named Hanim and Ha'll (attested in inscriptions as Hn'm and Hʿll). The first Christian ruler of Himyar, Marthad'ilan Yanuf is also identified as being one of his sons, with the full name Marthad ibn 'Abd-Kulal al-Himyari.

== Religion ==
In the inscriptions, 'Abd-Kulal can be seen praising the god Rahmanan, which shows he believed in a form of monotheism. Muslim historians like al-Tabari and Jawad Ali stated that 'Abd-Kulal was a convert to a form of non-trinitarian Christianity. He concealed his faith; Tabari states that it was because his teacher had been killed for being a Christian while Said al-Andalusi narrates that it was to prevent Yemen from being invaded by Shapur II, who had raided some Byzantine cities out of hatred for Christianity.

== See also ==
- Marthad'ilan Yanuf
- List of rulers of Saba' and Himyar
