= Charibael =

1st-century South Arabian ruler

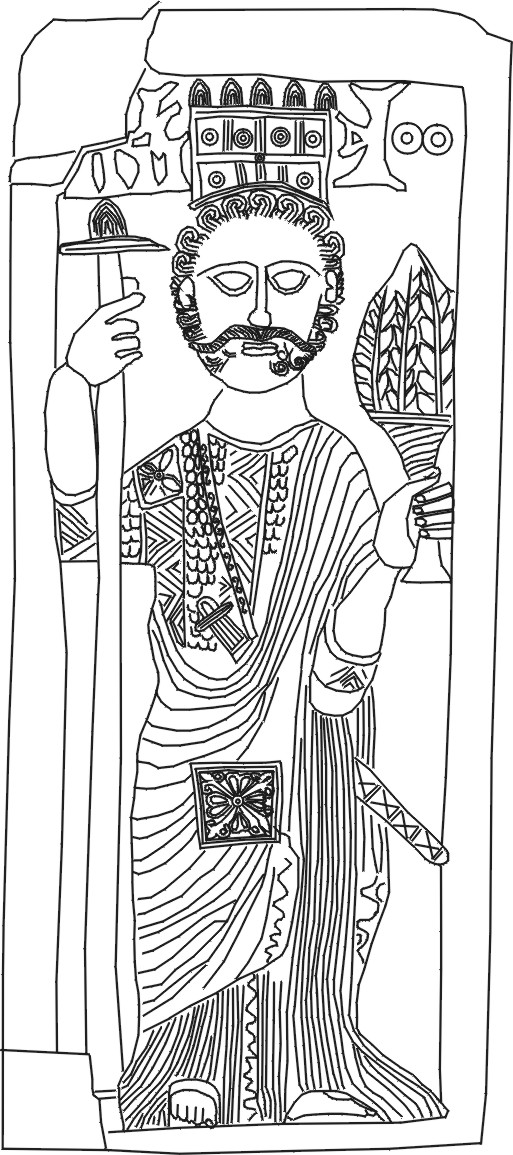
A relief of an armed, armored, and crowned figure from the ruins of Zafar, Yemen, described as the seat of the kingdom of Charibael in the Periplus of the Erythraean Sea.

Charibael (Sabaean: 𐩫𐩧𐩨𐩱𐩡, romanized: Karibʾīl, "Blessed by God", or "Following God") was a South Arabian ruler described in and contemporary with the first-century Periplus of the Erythraean Sea.

== Name ==
The two Greek manuscripts of the Periplus give two variations of the name:

- Koinē Greek: Χαριβαήλ, romanized: Kharibaḗl
- Koinē Greek: Χαριβαήλα, romanized: Kharibaḗla,

This name was latinized as Charibael or Charibaël. There is now widespread agreement that this name represents a transcription of the Sabaic name KRBʾL (Sabaean: 𐩫𐩧𐩨𐩱𐩡). Pace Glaser & Schoff, this was not a title but was a regnal name shared by numerous other South Arabian rulers.

== Description ==
A map reconstructing the trade routes and kingdoms described in the 1st-century Periplus. Charibael's kingdom is described as controlling the Himyarites, Sabaeans, and the major ports of Azania on the Swahili coast.

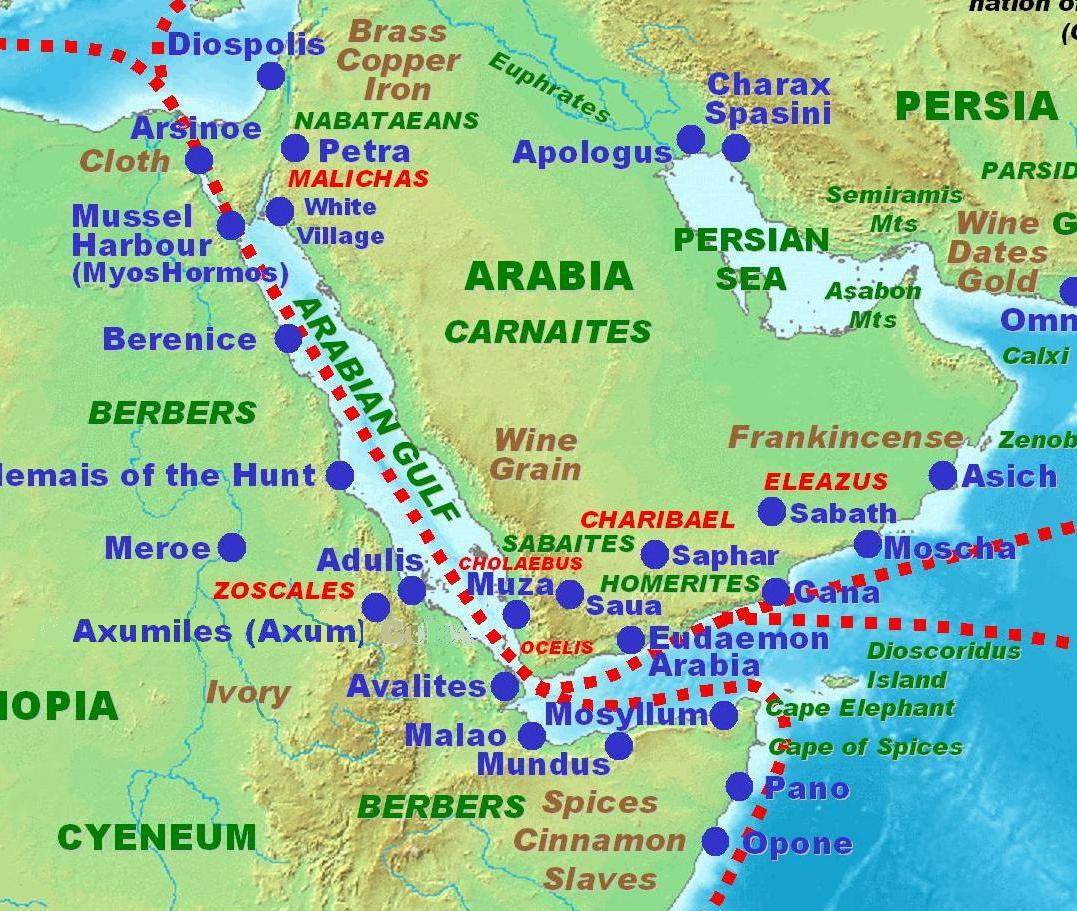
A detail of the places in the Periplus located around the Red and Arabian Seas.

The Periplus calls Charibael the "lawful king" of the "Homerites" and "those living next to them called the Sabaites". He is said to dwell in Saphar and to maintain friendship with the Roman emperors by means of "continual embassies and gifts". He is said to exercise control over the towns of "Muza" (Mocha) and "Saua" (Taiz) in "Mapharitis" through a "vassal-chief" named "Cholaebus" (Kula'ib). From the Roman merchants calling at Mocha, he required tribute of "horses and sumpter-mules, vessels of gold and polished silver, finely woven clothing and copper vessels". His realm included "Ocelis" at the Bab-el-Mandeb and the ruins at "Eudaemon Arabia" but to exert little control beyond it, with the rest of the coast of the Arabian Sea peopled by nomads and fishermen, the "Frankincense Country" of "Eleazus", and the Parthian Empire's recent conquests in what is now Oman. The Periplus credits Charibael with indirect dominion over the major ports of Azania, the present-day Somali and Swahili coasts, through his vassals at Mocha.

He is also probably the monarch responsible for the destruction of the port of Eudaemon Arabia (Aden) This was likely in service to his allies at Mocha, who would have been Aden's commercial rivals. Attributing the attack to Charibael, however, requires revision of the text, whose manuscripts attribute the attack to "a Caesar". In the 19th century, Müller and Dittrich emended "Caesar" to "Elisar", whom they identified with the King Eleazus mentioned elsewhere in the text. This has not been supported by inscriptions in South Arabia and is far less likely on geographical grounds as well. Other researchers have maintained that the reference is to the invasion of Arabia by the Egyptian prefect G. Aelius Gallus in 26 BC. Apart from the many decades separating that campaign from the Periplus, the detailed description of the campaign in Strabo shows that the army proceeded overland and was successfully misled and sabotaged by the Nabataean patriot Syllaeus before reaching any of the southern ports. Pliny explicitly names the furthest point reached as "Caripeta", usually taken after Forster as a scribal error for a previously mentioned "Cariata", the Qaryatayn near Ibb in the Yemeni highlands. Pliny further explicitly states in the same passage that no other Roman force had reached so far into Arabia as late as the time of his composition of the Natural History, now usually placed well after the Periplus.

== Identification ==
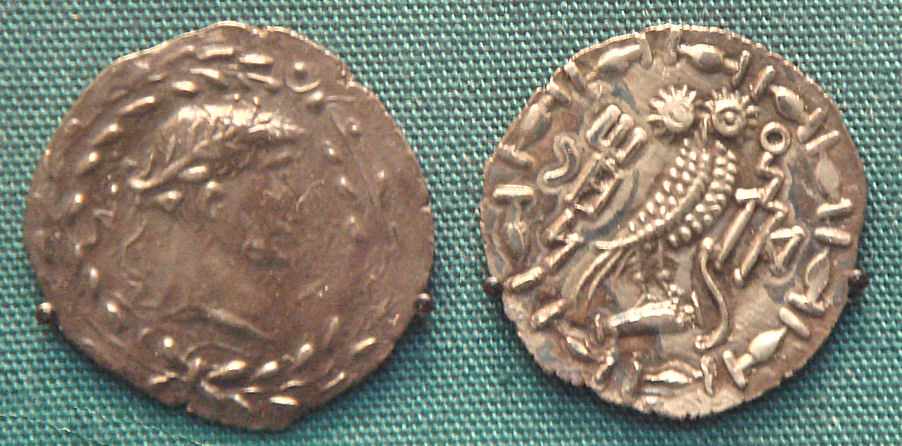
A Roman-influenced coin from 1st-century Yemen

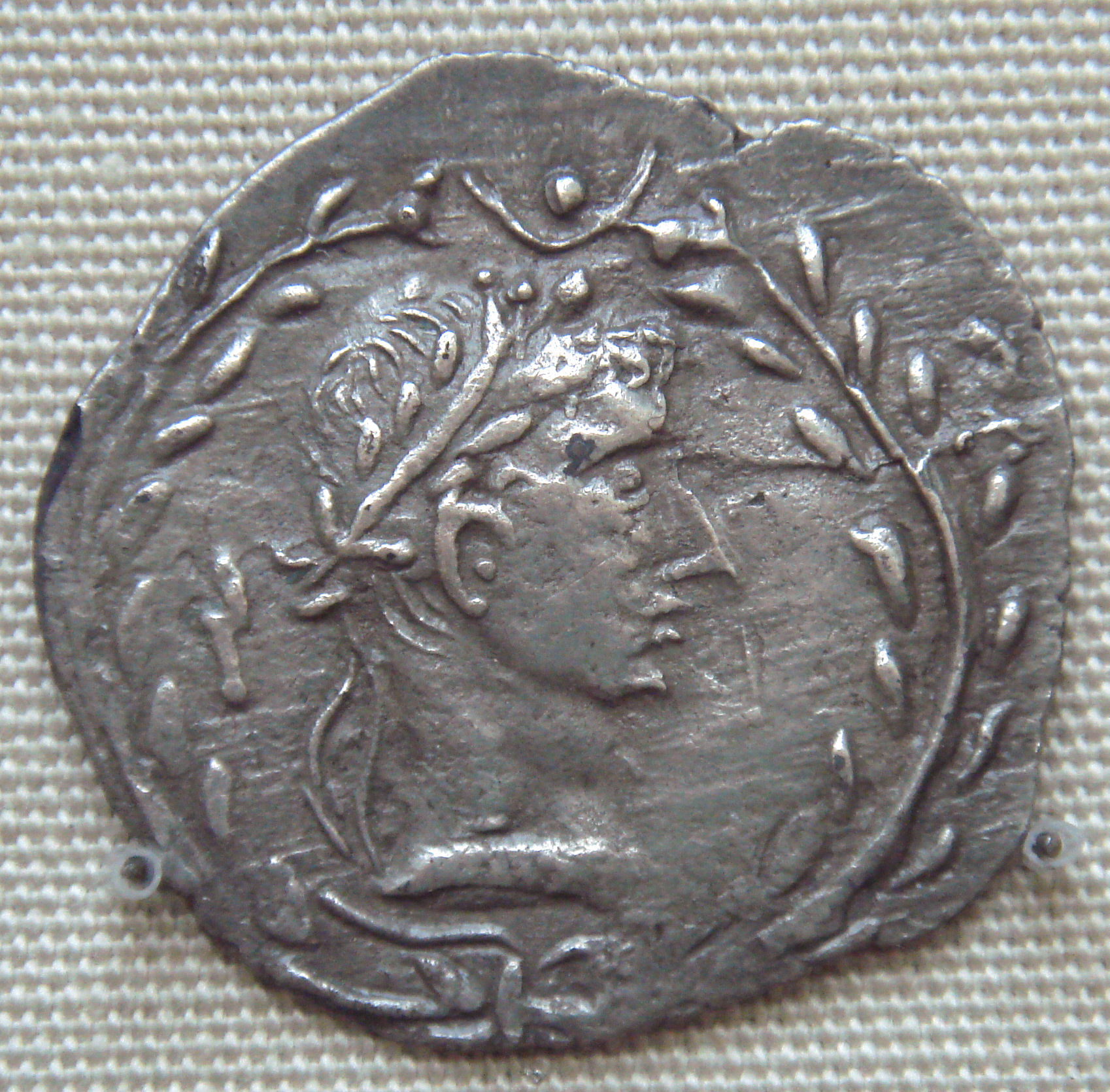
A counterfeit Roman coin from 1st-century Yemen

Since Glaser's 19th-century work with Arabian inscriptions, Charibael is usually identified with the Karibʾīl Watar Yuhan'im who ruled Himyar sometime between AD 40 and 70. The issue is muddied by two factors. First, the rulers of Himyar and Sabaʾ both employed the title "king of Sabaʾ and Dhu Raydan"; the title was also assumed by Hadhramauti invaders around the time. The existence of such competing claims is even implied by the phrasing of the Periplus that calls Charibael the "lawful" king, in probable distinction to less powerful rivals. Second, the inscriptions have revealed five different Karibʾīls during the 1st century. Thus, the Periplus’s "Charibael" is sometimes identified as Karibʾīl Bayān, son of Dhamarʿalī Dharib and king of Sabaʾ during the 80s.

== See also ==
- List of rulers of Saba and Himyar
