= YM 1200 =

Sabaic inscription in Yemen

YM 1200 is one of the pre-Islamic Arabian inscriptions discovered in South Arabia, now housed within the National Museum of Yemen. This inscription is composed in the Sabaic language and dates back to the 5th century CE. It is also a monumental inscription. YM 1200 was first translated by Iwona Gajda in the year 1998.

== Content ==
The inscription is eight lines long, and it reads:

Mrṯdʾln Ynʿm m↯[lk S¹bʾ w-ḏ-Rydn w-Ḥḍrmwt w-Ymnt w-ʾʿrb-h]mw Ṭwdm w-Th(m)↯[t bn Lḥyʿt Ynf mlk S¹bʾ w-ḏ-Rydn w-Ḥḍ]—rmwt w-Ymnt w-↯[ʾʿrb-hmw Ṭwdm w-Thmt bn S²rḥbʾl Yk]—f mlk S¹(b)↯[ʾ w-ḏ-Rydn w-Ḥḍrmwt w-Ymnt w-ʾ]—ʿrb-hmw Ṭ↯[wdm w-Thmt brʾw w-hqs²bn w-]ṯwbn mk(r)↯[bn ... ...]-hw w-rḥbn kns¹t↯[... ...]kl s²yʾ-hw qs²bm ↯[... ...]

An English-language transliteration, first edited and interpreted by Iwona Gajda, reads:

Marthad'ilan Yu'nim, King of Saba', Dhu Raydan, Hadhramaut, Yamnat, and their Arabs on Tawdum and Tihamat, the son of Lakhni'ah Yanuf the King of Saba', Dhu Raydan, Hadhramaut, Yamnat, and their Arabs on Tawdum and Tihamat, the son of Sharhabil Yakkuf, the King of Saba', Dhu Raydan, Hadhramaut, Yamnat, and their Arabs on Tawdum and Tihamat, has constructed, begun and achieved the place of worship (? Attested to as Knst) and enlarged the mikrab (synagogue) [...] All of his possession [...]

== Dating ==
Christian J. Robin dates the inscription to the late 5th century CE, between the years 480–485 CE.

== Interpretation and significance ==
The inscription is considered a monumental inscription and details the construction projects of the king Marthad'ilan Yu'nim which involve religious structures. The text describes the king as ordering the construction of a synagogue as well as the reparation of a monotheistic place of worship. Al Jazeera Press writer, Muammar Al Sharjabi, identifies this monotheistic place of worship as a church, but at the same time also interpreted the name of the king as Marthad'ilan Yanuf instead of Marthad'ilan Yu'nim. According to him, this inscription does show that the kings before Dhu Nuwas were tolerant of other religions in their realm.

== See also ==
- Judaism in pre-Islamic Arabia
- Christianity in pre-Islamic Arabia
- CIH 6
- Jabal Dabub inscription
- Ri al-Zallalah inscription
