= Rabia ibn Nasr =

Rabia ibn Nasr (Arabic: ربيعة بن نصر) also known as Rabia ibn Mudhar was a legendary Yemeni king who purportedly existed between 460 CE and 470 CE. He was one of the kings of Himyar, hence he received the title Tubba' (plural:Tababi'ah), but he was from a family of Sabaean ancestry, therefore, he was one of the Adhaaf al-Tababi'ah (Arabic: أضعاف التبابعة). No archaeological inscriptions for him or his rule have been found yet.

== Biography ==
According to Al-Suhayli, al-Lakhmi, and Ibn Ishaq, his name is "Rabia ibn Nasr ibn Abu Haritha ibn 'Amru ibn 'Amir". Al-Suhayli, quoting the genealogists of Yemen, says his full name is "Nasr ibn Rabia ibn Nasr ibn al-Harithah ibn Nimarah ibn Lakhm". (Note: Lakhm's real name is Malik ibn 'Udayy ibn al-Harith ibn Murrah ibn 'Ad ibn Zayd ibn 'Amru ibn 'Awrib ibn Zayd ibn Kahlan ibn Saba') Al-Zubayr ibn Bakkar says his name is "Nasr ibn Rabiah ibn Nasr ibn Malik ibn Sha'wuth ibn Malik ibn Ajam ibn 'Amru ibn Nimarah ibn Lakhm".

== Time period ==
His time period and reign is not attested to in the Arabian legends, but he is placed as reigning before Hassan Yuha'min, presumably at the same time as Abu Karib.

== The dream of Rabia ibn Nasr ==
Arabian legends tell of Rabia ibn Nasr having a dream which foretold the coming of Muhammad. The story was recorded by historians like Ibn Ishaq and Ibn Hisham in their books on the prophetic biography.

Rabiah ibn Nasr had a dream that terrified him, he sent to all the soothsayers, magicians, drawers of omens from the flight of birds and astrologers to interpret his dream. He refused to tell them what had happened in the dream, saying that the person who would know the correct interpretation would be able to know the dream without the need to recount it. Rabiah was advised to visit the two famous soothsayers, Shaq and Satih.

When Rabiahl asked Satih what was his dream, he replied, "You dreamed that there was a skull that came out of the darkness to the Tihamah that started to eat the heads of the people". Rabia told him he was correct, and asked him how he would interpret the dream. Satih replied that the Abyssinians (referring to the Axumite Empire) would invade Yemen and rule it. Scared and panicked, Rabia asked Satih when this event would happen, to with Satih replied that it would be approximately sixty to seventy years later. Satih reassured Rabia that a king from the people of the Dhu Yazan family (referring to Sayf ibn Dhi Yazan) would expel the Abyssinians and rule Yemen. Rabia then asked if the rule of the king would be forever, and Satih replied that it would be cut shortly, and afterwards a Prophet would come whose dominion would last until the end of time. Rabia asked if what Satih was saying was true, and Satih swore that he was not a liar.

Shaqiq soon arrived, and told Rabia a similar interpretation. When Rabia saw that both Shaqiq and Satih had given the same interpretations of his dream, he sent his family to Al-Hirah, and wrote to a Persian king called Shabur ibn Khorramzad (Note: Probably Shapur I) on their behalf to allow them to settle there.

== Descendants ==
The first king of the Lakhmids, Amr ibn Adi, was a descendant of Rabia ibn Nasr.

== See also ==
- Amr ibn Adi
- Abu Karib
- Hassan Yuha'min
