= Qawm Tubba' =

People in pre-Islamic Yemen

The People of Tubba' (Arabic: قوم تبع, Qawm Tubba) are a group of people mentioned in the Qur'an. They are only mentioned twice; first in the chapter Ad-Dukhan and next in Qaf. They are citizens of pre-Islamic Yemen, whom were given divine punishments for their misdeeds and rejection of the divine messengers sent by God.

== Islamic literature ==
The word Tubba' was in fact a title which was used by the Himyarites to refer to their rulers. The identity of the Tubba' here is unknown, however scholars including Ibn Kathir, Ibn Ishaq, Ibn Hisham, Ibn al-Kalbi and Tabari have identified him as the Himyarite king Abu Karib. Ibn al-Jawzi also has a narration which cites the Tubba' as being Malikikarib Yuhamin, Abu Karib's father and predecessor.

There is a Hadith of disputed authenticity, which affirms that Tubba' was a believer in a "correct" faith that preceded Islam. However, another narration states that it was not known whether Tubba' was accursed or not. Arab traditions cite that Tubba' converted to Judaism after he was warned by two rabbis at Medina to stay away from the city, as a Prophet would migrate there in future.

== Qur'anic references ==
The people of Tubba' are mentioned twice in the Qu'ran:

- ۝ Are they better or the people of Tubba' and those who went before them? We destroyed them [for] indeed, they were a criminal people.
  ۝ And the companions of the thicket and the people of Tubba'. All denied the messengers, so My threat was justly fulfilled.

== See also ==
- Pharaoh in the Qu'ran
