= Ubayd bin Sharia =

Arab historian

'Ubayd bin Shari'a

Personal life
- Born: 'Ubayd bin Shari'a al-Jurhami
- Died: 686 CE (67 Hijri)
- Occupation: Historian

Religious life
- Religion: Islam
- Denomination: Sunni Islam

'Ubayd bin Shari'a al-Jurhami (Arabic: عبيد بن شرية الجرهمي, died 686) also known as 'Ubayd bin Suriyah was an early Arab historian who lived during the rule of the Umayyad Caliphate in the 7th century CE. He specialized in Yemeni history. Some narrations from him are present in The Book of Crowns on the Kings of Himyar, a semi-legendary book about the rulers of the Himyarite Kingdom.

== Life ==
The birth date of 'Ubayd bin Shari'a al-Jurhami is unknown. However, he was a contemporary of Muawiyah and also met him in the year 660. He died in 686 during the rule of Abd al-Malik ibn Marwan, the fourth Umayyad Caliph. His age is disputed upon amongst historians; 'Ubayd told Muawiyah that he was 240 years old, something which the latter refused to believe, while 'Ubayd himself has also said that he is 150 years old in some of his works. Another narrative also states that he lived for at least three hundred years. Zarif Marzouk denied the ages stated in the narratives, and came to the conclusion that 'Ubayd died much lesser than what had been stated previously.

== Historicity ==
=== Existence ===
Some scholars have disputed whether 'Ubayd bin Shari'a was a real person. Qarunqu denied his existence, and instead concluded that he was a character invented by the historian Ibn al-Nadim, the author of the Fihrist.

=== Authenticity ===
Hamilton Gebb mentioned that 'Ubayd did provide the Arabs with early historical information that lacked historical senses. Jawad Ali, on the other hand, accused 'Ubayd of taking stories from Arabian Jewish tales and folklore.

Abdul Aziz al-Douri regarded any narrations of 'Ubayd as mere folktales and poetic imaginary stories of Yemeni history.

== Works ==
The book Kitab al-Muluk wa al-Akhbar al-Madhi was attributed to 'Ubayd bin Shari'a, and a more recent copy was first printed in Hyderabad in 1928, while another older copy still exists in the British Museum. This book, however, is disputed in terms of its authenticity.

== See also ==
- Wahb ibn Munabbih
- Al-Tabari
- Ibn Kathir
