= Sharhabil Ya'fur =

- King of Saba', Dhu Raydan, Hadramawt, Yamnat and their Arabs, on Tawdum and Tihamat
- Reign: 450–465 CE
- Predecessor: Hassan Yuha'min
- Successor: Sharhabil Yakkuf: Succeeded by Dhu Shanatir in the Arabian folklore
- Died: c. 465; Yemen
- Issue: Hassan
Names
- Sharhabil Ya'fur ibn Abu Karib As'ad ibn Hassan Malikikarib Yuha'min
- Father: Abu Karib
- Religion: Judaism

Sharhabil Ya'fur (Arabic: شرحبيل يعفر), also known as 'Amr ibn Tubba' al-Himyari, was a Himyarite king who ruled in the 5th century CE. His rule was unique, as he was the only ruler descended from Dhamar Ali Yahbur II who ruled by himself and did not have a co-regent.

== Reign ==
Sharhabil Ya'fur was co-regent with his father Abu Karib As'ad and brother Hassan Yuha'min in 433 CE. After Abu Karib As'ad had died, Sharhabil Ya'fur and Hassan Yuha'min jointly ruled over Yemen. In 450 CE, only Sharhabil's name was visible in inscriptions, implying that Hassan Yuha'min was no longer in power. Sharhabil Ya'fur then ruled alone, a style which was different from the other rulers descended from Dhamar Ali Yahbur, as he did not have a co-regent throughout the rest of his life. The last inscription mentioning his name is dated to 465 CE however Christian J. Robin believed that he remained in power until 468 CE. The similarly-named Sharhabil Yakkuf succeeded him.

== Construction projects ==
In 454 CE, cracks appeared on the Ma'rib Dam, causing it to leak. Sharhabil Ya'fur, using a huge sum of money, hired a lot of builders to help restore the dam to its original state. Construction was completed a year later in 455 CE. According to Tabari, Sharhabil Ya'fur also constructed a large monument commemorating himself at Dhofar.

== Sharhabil Ya'fur in Arabian legends ==
According to the Arabian folklore, the tribal chiefs who were tired of Hassan's rule incited his brother Sharhabil Ya'fur (known here as 'Amr ibn Tubba' al-Himyari) against him. So, despite pleas from Hassan and advice from a chief who disagreed with the rebellion, 'Amr killed Hassan and was installed as the new ruler on the throne of Himyar. Historians believe this story may have preserved a historical fact that Sharhabil Ya'fur killed his predecessor; which explains how he did not have a co-regent at all.

Arabian legends also narrate that 'Amr had a son named Hassan, who reigned after Marthad'ilan Yanuf.

== See also ==
- List of rulers of Saba and Himyar
