= Tharan Yaub Yuhanim =

Tha'ran Ya'ub Yuhan'im
- King of Sabaʾ and ḏu-Raydān
- Reign: c. 155 – 214
- Predecessor: Dhamar Ali Yahbur
- Successor: Lazm Yanuf Yuhasd'iq
- Died: c. 214; South Arabia
- Religion: South Arabian polytheism

Tha'ran Ya'ub Yuhan'im (Arabic: ثأران يعب يهنعم) was a ruler of the ancient Kingdoms of Saba' and Dhu-Raydan, which was located in present-day Yemen. The earliest mention of Tha'ran is in inscriptions from 155 CE as part of a co-regency with his father, Dhamar Ali Yahbur. He succeeded his father around 175 and ruled alone until 214.

== Reign ==
=== Co-regency ===
Tha'ran entered power firstly as a co-regent under his father, Dhamar Ali Yahbur. There are two inscriptions regarding the Sabaeans pledging allegiance to Tha'ran and Dhamar Ali found at the important Sabean religious site, the Temple of Awwam. Father and son ordered repairs for the Ma'rib Dam during their co-reign.

=== Single reign ===
Tha'ran took power as a single ruler around 175. Eventually, he stylized his throne name as Tha'ran Ya'ub Yuhan'im. He also became affiliated with the tribe of Himyar. In 180–185 CE, the rebel prince Rabb Shams Nimran launched war on Himyar's lands as a retaliation against the actions of Tha'ran Ya'ub Yuhan'im. In 212, Tha'ran sent a diplomatic delegation to the Kingdom of Hadhramaut to congratulate its new ruler, Il'azz Yalit II. His rule ended in 214; Lazm Yanuf Yuhasd'iq taking the throne in the same year.

== Legacy ==
Life-sized statues of Dhamar Ali Yahbur and Tha'ran Ya'ub Yuhan'im made out of bronze.

The later Himyarite ruler, Abu Karib, once lamented Tha'ran: "Tha'ran Yahbur has been mine to follow, the virtues of the covenant and mastery."

== See also ==
- List of rulers of Saba' and Himyar
