= Marthad'ilan Yu'nim =

- King of Saba', Dhu Raydan, Hadramawt, Yamnat and their Arabs, on Tawdum and Tihamat
- Reign: 480–485 CE (High chronology); 480–504 CE (Low chronology)
- Predecessor: Sharhabil Yakkuf and Lakhni'ah Yanuf
- Successor: Marthad'ilan Yanuf
- Died: c. 504; Yemen
Names
- Marthad ibn Lakhni'ah Yanuf al-Himyari
Regnal name
- Marthad'ilan Yu'nim
- Father: Lakhni'ah Yanuf
- Religion: Judaism

Marthad'ilan Yu'nim (Arabic: مرثد ألن ينعم) also known as Marthad al-Khayr, was a Himyarite king who primarily reigned in the late 5th century CE. He is known for his involvement in the Basus War.

== Name ==
As attested in inscriptions, his name is Marthad'ilan Yu'nim; his full name being Marthad ibn Lakhni'ah Yanuf al-Himyari. In the books of Arab heritage, his name is Marthad al-Khayr ibn Dhi Jadan. The word Yun'im is Himyaritic for "blessed" which is al-Khayr in Arabic.

== Reign ==
Marthad'ilan Yu'nim started his reign in the year 480. According to the inscription YM 1200, he constructed a synagogue and repaired an unknown monotheistic place of worship known as a Kenesit. Christian J. Robin believed his reign ended in the year 485 CE however there is an inscription dated to 502 CE which does mention his name along with his siblings; the inscription also does not mention him with royal titles. According to the Arabian traditions, Marthad'ilan Yu'nim was succeeded by a king named Qarmal.

== Military campaigns ==
Marthad'ilan Yu'nim sent a force of five hundred soldiers to assist Imru' al-Qays in his mission to reunite the Taghlib and Banu Bakr tribes in the Basus War in order to defeat the Banu Asad.

== See also ==
- List of rulers of Saba' and Himyar
