= Basilis (writer) =

Ancient Greek writer

Basilis (Ancient Greek: Βάσιλις) was a writer (or possibly multiple writers) of ancient Greece. Several ancient authors describe a writer named "Basilis" who wrote on geographical subjects, and it is generally assumed these are all the same person. There is not unanimous consensus about his date, but several scholars say he probably lived in the 2nd or 3rd century BCE.

Pliny the Elder wrote that in the reign of Ptolemy II Philadelphus (that is, the 3rd century BCE), a Basilis traveled the Upper Nile river. According to Pliny, he also seems to have written on Aethiopia, as he gave an account of the size of the country. The 2nd-century grammarian Athenaeus quotes the second book of a work on India (Ἰνδικά) by a "Basilis". A "Basilis" is also mentioned by the 2nd-century BCE geographer Agatharchides among the writers on the east.

We also possess some fragments of his, in which he describes Pygmy peoples in wildly mythological terms, as being small enough to ride on the back of a partridge.

The 19th century Arabist and archaeologist Eduard Glaser identified Basilis as the author of the Periplus of the Erythraean Sea, but other scholars, such as Wilfred Harvey Schoff, disagreed strongly.
