= Sa'b Dhu Marathid =

Mythical South Arabian king

Ṣaʿb Dhu Marāthid (also al-Ṣaʿb b. Dhī Marāthid) was a mythical world-conqueror figure (Note: Islamic tradition also describes other pre-Islamic Yemeni world-conquerors, including Abu Karib, among others.) described in the medieval Islamic tradition as the tenth South Arabian king of the Himyarite Kingdom. Early in life, Sa'b repeatedly receives prophetic dreams that foreshadow his future as the ruler of the world. To understand these visions, the interpreters and religious leaders in his circle send him to Jerusalem to meet a mysterious figure named Moses al-Khidr. Al-Khidr establishes Sa'b's future as the world-conqueror, and endows him with the title Dhu al-Qarnayn. From then on, Sa'b gathers an army and he conquers all kingdoms, among them the great civilizations of India, China, and Iran. During his travels, he also experiences epic journeys and quests, such as constructing a wall against the barbarian tribes Gog and Magog or meeting Israfil, the angel of death. Spiritual encounters with God enable him to continue on. Ultimately, he decides to return to his home after completing all he had sought to do, but dies on the way back in Babylon after a brief illness.

The biography of Sa'b is largely borrowed from that of Alexander the Great as it occurs in the legendary Alexander Romance tradition. Following Alexander, South Arabian tradition identified him as Dhu al-Qarnayn, a character in the Quran appearing in Surah Al-Kahf. The main source for traditions about Sa'b is The Book of Crowns on the Kings of Himyar by Ibn Hisham.

== Etymology ==
The word saʿb may variously mean "headstrong" or "obstinate" whereas marāthid might refer to "a generous man".

== Key texts and inspiration ==
The primary source for the life of Sa'b Dhu Marathid is Ibn Hisham (d. 833) in his Book of Crowns on the Kings of Himyar. One chapter of this work is dedicated to this figure, and it presently exists in two editions: one was published in Hyderabad in 1347 AH (1928 AD) in a larger volume also containing the Akhbar 'Ubayd bin Shari'a al-Jurhami (The Histories of 'Ubayd bin Shari'a al-Jurhami), and a second is available from Lidzbarski in his German volume Zu den arabischen Alexandergeschichten. Ibn Hisham claims to draw on the lost writings of the Yemeni traditionalist Wahb ibn Munabbih in his descriptions. However, it is unlikely that Wahb's original text contained a South Arabian identification of Dhu al-Qarnayn especially given that Al-Tabari's tafsir on Wahb's use of Dhu al-Qarnayn legends lacks any hint of Himyarite elements, and that other exegetical traditions transmitted on Wahb's authority connects Dhu al-Qarnayn to Alexander. One proposal is that the South Arabian image of Dhu al-Qarnayn emerged among South Arabians living in eighth-century Egypt.

The other important sources for traditions about Sa'b Dhu Marathid include al-Hamdani (d. 947) in his encyclopedia Kitab al-Iklīl (known as The Antiquities of South Arabia in English translation), and Nashwan al-Himyari (d. 1178) in his Khulāṣa (short for the Khulāṣat al-sīra al-jāmiʾa li-ʿajāʾib akhbār al-mulūk al-tabābiʿa, or "Quintessence of the comprehensive history concerning the wondrous reports of the Tubbaʿ kings").

Traditions about the life of Sa'b Dhu Marathid are derivative from the biography of Alexander in the tradition of Pseudo-Callisthenes including those from recensions of Alexander legends in Greek, Syriac, Ethiopic, and Persian. Others think that Ibn Hisham's biography of Sa'b primarily reflects the weaving of traditions found in the Syriac Alexander Legend and the Quran. The majority of stories about Sa'b in Ibn Hisham's al-Tijān are found in earlier romances/novels about Alexander. Examples include his search for the Fountain of Life, his defeat of Gog and Magog, his construction of a wall, and his reign over the Earth from East to West. His visit to Jerusalem may reflect Alexander's supplication to place his throne in Jerusalem in anticipation of the coming of the Messiah. The figure known as "Moses al-Khidr" reflects a conflation of the figures of Moses and the old man (identified as al-Khidr by commentators) in Quran 18:60–82, and his association with the life of Dhu al-Qarnayn is reflected by the subsequent immediate appearance of that figure in Q 18:83–102. Although Ibn Hisham depicts Dhu al-Qarnayn as Sa'b in the Al-Tijān, his recension of the sīrah of Ibn Ishaq identifies Dhu al-Qarnayn with Alexander instead.

== Biography ==
=== Genealogy and chronology ===
Ibn Hisham's account which serves to praise the history of South Arabia begins by describing the creation and the prophetic genealogy. The rulers of the Himyarite Kingdom are described as having descended from the prophet Hud, who is a descendant of Shem, the son of Noah. The first Himyarite king is the mythical Waʾil b. Himyar, and the final one listed is Sayf ibn Dhi Yazan who helped bring about an end of Axumite rule over South Arabia with the help of the Sasanian Empire. According to Ibn Hisham, Sa'b was the tenth king of Himyar. Ibn Hisham spends forty-five pages in the standard editions of the text on the reign of Sa'b, whereas he spends at most six on any of the others. Sa'b is chronologically placed in the time of Abraham to distinguish him from Alexander the Great who is said to have lived closer to the time of Jesus.

=== Dreams and guidance ===
The narration of Sa'b's life in the description of Ibn Hisham begins with him already as an adult ruler who begins to have apparitions of hell and divine power. He encounters dreams over the course of four nights. Entire mountains are held by his hands in the first. In the second, he holds the sun in his right hand and the moon in his left hand. In the third, he eats the worlds mountains and drinks the worlds seas. In the fourth, all the creatures of the world come seated in between his hands. Sa'b seeks guidance by the religious leaders and astrologers to interpret his dreams: the dreams have convinced him to give up his lofty life, and the visions give him an overwhelming desire for world domination. Instead of interpreting his dreams, they send him to a prophet and a descendant of Abraham known as Moses al-Khidr (whose full name is given as: Mūsā al-Khiḍr b. Khiḍrūn b. ʿUmūm b. Yahūdhā b. Yaʿqūb b. Isḥāq b. Ibrāhīm al-Khalīl), sometimes described as the 'Green Man', located in Jerusalem, a prophetic figure described as a traveler and timeless. Sa'b gathers the worlds largest army and travels to Jerusalem. Before reaching Jerusalem, he stops by Mecca where he circumambulates the Kaaba. Following his pilgrimage, he makes his way to Jerusalem where he meets al-Khidr. Al-Khidr addresses him as Dhu al-Qarnayn, a title that al-Khidr explains to mean that he is the possessor of the two horns of the sun. Al-Khidr then interprets his dreams and confirms his understanding that he is to conquer the world, but that he should also remain faithful to God in doing so.

=== Conquests ===
From there, he begins to journey back and forth across the Earth and reached its ends including the places where the sun sets and rises, conquering or converting the peoples that he encountered along the way as God had given him dominion over the Earth. He reached China, India, Iran, and eventually died in Iraq (Babylonia) after a brief illness. Al-Khidr is said to have never visited anyone again after the death of Sa'b. It was said that Sa'b had built a wall against Gog and Magog, met with Israfil, an angel of death, and the story of him in the Land of Rubies. Furthermore, Sa'b is said to experience sabab, which Ibn Hisham takes to refer to spiritual encounters with God that allowed Sa'b to continue his journeys. Ibn Hisham describes one of these encounters as follows:

Dhū ʾl-Qarnayn was sleeping when he saw a sabab. It was as if night had covered the whole world until the sun rose white and clear from the West. Dhū ʾl-Qarnayn continued to approach the sun and follow its light until he reached a land decorated with the stars of the sky and he walked over them. Then he awoke and told al-Khiḍr about this sabab. Al-Khiḍr told him: 'You have been ordered to go to the West and reach the Valley of Diamonds: Al-Khiḍr received a revelation (waḥy) and he informed Dhū ʾl-Qarnayn about this. The true sababs came to Dhū ʾl-Qarnayn who told al-Khiḍr about them.

For Ibn Hisham, the description of the life of Sa'b bears various similarities to his understanding of the life of Muhammad, including disturbing and frightening experiences with the divine alienating them from their contemporaries, leading them to interact with someone associated previously with monotheism to enable the validation of their visions.

=== Historicity ===
Academics consider the Sa'b story to be an appropriation of the Syriac Alexander Legend. Ibn Hisham attributed his material about Sa'b to Wahb ibn Munabbih, but Tilman Nagel doubts that Wahb's text included this particular story given Ibn Hisham's sceptical attitude to the claims of Southern Arabians, and notes that al-Tabari relied on Wahb's Alexander story yet included no Himyarite (South Arabian) elements. Following a detailed analysis, Nagel instead defines the milieu in which this version emerged as that of South Arabians in early eighth-century Egypt, and observes that Southern Arabs were one of two factions who vied for power in the Umayyad empire.

Richard Stoneman notes that Wahb was known for the composition of qisas, in which folklore is served up as history. According to Stoneman, the South Arabian legend of Sa'b's life was composed within the context of the division between the South Arabs and North Arabs that began with the Battle of Marj Rahit in 684 AD and consolidated over two centuries. He too dates the story to the 8th century CE, intended to give a parallel for, and to justify, the Islamic conquests in the west, representing a glorification of the South Arabian traditions and their conquests in Egypt. Anna Akasoy agrees with Alfred Beeston that Sa'b's entire existence is fictional and a product of Yemeni chauvinism, noting that later Yemeni Kings whose existence is confirmed were assigned similar exploits borrowed from legends of Alexander.

== Connection with Dhu al-Qarnayn ==
Though most believed Dhu al-Qarnayn to be Alexander the Great, some authors sympathetic to the South Arabian (Yemeni) cause would come to assimilate his identity into that of a South Arabian, often a Himyarite king that they called Sa'b Dhu Marathid; these authors argued that 'Dhū' was a typical Himyarite onomasticon. Al-Hisham presents himself as recording traditions from the Yemeni traditionalist Wahb ibn Munabbih in supporting this identification. In one example of Ibn Hisham's record, Wahb had asked one of Muhammad's companions, Ibn Abbas, about the identity of Dhu al-Qarnayn. Ibn Abbas responded by identifying him with Sa'b on the basis of the exploits attributed to his life. Wahb then asks Ibn Abbas about the relevance or place that Alexander has with respect to these figures, to which Ibn Abbas asserts that Alexander was a distinct yet pious figure, a Greek rather than a South Arabian whose reputation was having built two lighthouses. Ibn Hisham wrote:

[...] he (ʿAbdallāh b. (al-)ʿAbbās) was asked about dhū l-qarnayn, who he was. He said: 'He was from Ḥimyar, and he was al-Ṣaʾb b. dhī Marāthid, and he was the one whom God made strong on earth, and he gave him means for everything. He reached the two extremities of the sun and he trod the earth and built the dam against Gog and Magog.' He (Wahb b. Munabbih) asked: 'And Alexander the Rūmī [Byzantine]?' He (ʿAbdallāh b. (al-)ʿAbbās) answered: 'Alexander the Rūmī was a virtuous and wise man. He built on the sea of Ifrīqīs two lighthouses, one in the land of Babylon, the other in the Land of Rome.'

Later, Himyari, who believed that non-Arabs were responsible for the Alexandrian identification, would elaborate on Ibn Hisham's account by outlining the full genealogy:

Kaʾb al-Aḥbār was asked about dhū l-qarnayn, and he said: 'We hold it to be correct from the knowledge of our [Jewish] religious authorities (aḥbār) and our ancestors that he was from Ḥimyar and that he was al-Ṣaʿb b. dhī Marāthid. Alexander was from the Banū Yūnān [the Greeks] b. ʿĪṣ b. Isḥāq b. Ibrāhīm [Abraham], the friend of God, and his men saw ʿĪsā b. Maryam [Jesus, son of Mary], among them Galenos, Aristoteles and Daniel. Galenos and Aristoteles were from the Rūm [Byzantines] of the Banū Yūnān [Greeks], and Daniel was from the Banū Isrāʾīl, one of the prophets of God.'

To further support his contention that the reader should identify Dhu al-Qarnayn with the Himyarite king as opposed to Alexander the Great, he claims that the pre-Islamic poet Imru' al-Qais wrote about Sa'b:

And he built a barrier where the sun rises against Gog and Magog among the mountains.

Traditions identifying Dhu al-Qarnayn with a South Arabian king have also been attributed to Hassan ibn Thabit, a poet of the time of Muhammad. Others, however, would reject this tradition. For instance, Ibn Abd al-Hakam attributed a quote to Muhammad authoritatively identifying Dhu al-Qarnayn with Alexander the Great as a response to those who identify him as a South Arabian king, and a version of this report is also found in the chronicles of al-Tabari.
