= Karibi-ilu =

Karibi-ilu was a Mukarrib of Saba' who reigned from 700 BC to 680 BC. The name Karibi-ilu in Akkadian matches "Karab-El Bayin" in Sabaean, combined of "KRB-El" which means one who carries out the instructions of El and "BYN" one who removes punishment.

== History ==
Karibi-ilu is the son of Itamru (Yatha' Amar Watar II) who was mentioned by Sargon II in 715 BC.

An Assyrian text which dates back to c. 685 BC talks about the gifts sent to Sennacherib from Karibi-ilu. The gifts consisted of silver, gold, types of the most exquisite perfume called "Rikke Tabutu" and precious gem stones which have traditionally been exported from South Arabia. Karibi-ilu built a house or a temple called "Bit-Akitu", to celebrate the New Year's and other holidays.

== See also ==
- List of rulers of Saba and Himyar
