= Hjalmar Frisk =

Swedish linguist and etymologist (1900–1984)

Hjalmar Frisk (4 August 1900, in Gothenburg – 1 August 1984, in Gothenburg) was a Swedish linguist and etymologist in Indo-European studies. He was also rector of the University of Gothenburg from 1951 to 1966.

Early on, he became interested in Indo-European studies. Thus, as early as 1927, he published a translation of the historical account The Periplus of the Erythraean Sea, written in Greek under the title Περίπλους τῆς Ἐρυθρᾶς θαλάσσης.

His most noted work was the three-volume Griechisches etymologisches Wörterbuch (Greek Etymological Dictionary) published in Heidelberg, Germany. The first fascicle of the first volume was published in 1954, the first volume was completed in 1960. The third volume was completed in 1972.

In 1968, he became a member of the Royal Swedish Academy of Sciences.

== Works ==
- Griechisches Etymologisches Wörterbuch (in German). 3 volumes. Heidelberg. 1954–1972.
