= Eleazus =

Hadramaut king of the 1st century

Eleazus, also Eleazar or Iliazz Yalit I, was the Hadramaut king of the southern tip of the Arabian Peninsula, the "Frankincense kingdom", in the 1st century CE. The main harbour of the kingdom was Cana (Kanê). His capital was the city of Sabat.

It is thought that Khor Rawri, anciently the biblical port of Sumhuram, was founded by King Eleazus.

Eleazus is described in the Periplus of the Erythraean Sea:

"27. After Eudaemon Arabia there is a continuous length of coast, and a bay extending two thousand stadia or more, along which there are Nomads and Fish-Eaters living in villages; just beyond the cape projecting from this bay there is another market-town by the shore, Cana, of the Kingdom of Eleazus, the Frankincense Country; and facing it there are two desert islands, one called Island of Birds, the other Dome Island, one hundred and twenty stadia from Cana. Inland from this place lies the metropolis Sabbatha, in which the King lives. All the frankincense produced in the country is brought by camels to that place to be stored, and to Cana on rafts held up by inflated skins after the manner of the country, and in boats. And this place has a trade also with the far-side ports, with Barygaza and Scythia and Ommana and the neighboring coast of Persia."

— Periplus of the Erythraean Sea, Chap 27

== See also ==
- List of rulers of Saba and Himyar
