= List of rulers of Saba and Himyar =

This is a list of rulers of Saba' and Himyar, ancient Arabian kingdoms which are now part of present-day Yemen. The kingdom of Saba' became part of the Himyarite Kingdom in the late 3rd century CE.

The title Mukarrib (Old South Arabian: 𐩣𐩫𐩧𐩨, romanized: mkrb) was used by the rulers of Saba' along the title Malik (Old South Arabian: 𐩣𐩡𐩫, romanized: mlk). The title of Mukarrib might have been used as a formal title for the head of a commonwealth of different šaʿb (community) groups until it eventually disappeared by the start of the first millennium AD. On the other hand, Malik was used as a title for the head of a šaʿb with various legal obligations. Later, the title of Malik transformed to imply territorial rule. After the fall of Dhu Nuwas around 530 CE to the Aksumite Empire, Yemen was open for foreign domination by the Aksumites and later the Sasanian Empire, both of whom installed local vassal rulers over the Yemeni people.

== Mukarribs of Saba' (1000–620 BCE) ==
	Mukarrib	Reigned	Notes
1	Yatha' 'Amr Bayin	circa 1000–950 BC	
2	Yada'il Bayin		
3	Samah'ali Yanuf		
4	Yatha' 'Amar Watar		
5	Yakrib Malek Dzarah		
6	Yakrib Malik Watar		
7	Samah'ali Yanuf II		
8	Yada'il Bayin II		
9	Yatha' 'Amar Watar II		He was a contemporary of Sargon II.
10	Yada' Ab		
11	Yada'il Bayin III		
12	Yakrib Malik Watar II		
13	Yatha' 'Amar Bayin II		
14	Karib'il Watar		He was a contemporary with Sennacherib. Not to be confused with the later king Karib'il Watar.
15	Yada' Ab II		
16	Akh Karib		
17	Samah'ali Watar		
18	Yada'il Dharih		Son of Samah'ali Watar (17).
19	Samah'ali Yanuf III		Son of Yada'il Dharih (18).
20	Yatha' 'Amar Watar III		Son of Yada'il Dharih (18) and the brother of Samah'ali Yanuf III (19).
21	Yada'il Bayin IV		Son of Yatha' 'Amar Watar III (20).
22	Yada'il Watar		Son of Yatha' 'Amar Watar III (20) and is the brother of Yada'il Bayin IV (21).
23	Dhamar Ali Dharih		Son of Yada'il Bayin IV (21).
24	Yatha' 'Amar Watar IV		Son of Samah'ali Yanuf III (19).
25	Karib'il Bayin		Son of Yatha' 'Amar Watar IV (24).
26	Samah'ali Yanuf IV		Son of Yatha' 'Amar Watar IV (24) and brother of Karabil Bayin (25).
27	Dhamar Ali Watar		Son of Samah'ali Yanuf IV (26).
28	Samah'ali Yanuf V		Son of Dhamar Ali Watar (27).
29	Yatha' 'Amar Bayin III		Son of Samah'ali Yanuf V (28).
30	Yakrib Malik Watar III		
31	Dhamar Ali Yanuf		Son of Yakrib Malik Watar III (30).

== Kings of Saba' ==
	King	Reigned	Notes
32	Karib'il Watar II	620–600 BC	Son of (31).
33	Sumuh'ali Dharih	600–580 BC	Son of (32).
34	Karib'il Watar III	580–570 BC	Son of (33).
35	Ilīsharaḥ I	570–560 BC	Son of (33).
36	Yada'il Bayin V	560–540 BC	Son of (34).
37	Yakrib Malik Watar IV	540–520 BC	Son of (36).
38	Yatha' Amar Bayin IV	520–500 BC	Son of (37).
39	Karib'il Watar IV	500–480 BC	Son of (38).
40	Sumuh'ali Yanuf VI	480–460 BC	Son of (39).
41	Yada'il Bayin VI		Son of (39).
42	Yatha' 'Amar Watar V		Son of (39).
43	Ilsharih II	460–445 BC	Son of 41
44	Zamir Ali Bayin I	445–430 BC	Son of 41
45	Yada'il Watar II	430–410 BC	Son of 44
46	Zamir Ali Bayin II	410–390 BC	Son of 45
47	Samah'ali Yanuf VII		Son of (46)
48	Karib'il Watar V	390–370 BC	Unknown parentage, probably the son of (46)
—	Unknown	370–350 BC	A period of time without any inscriptions dedicated to a ruler.
49	Karib Yuhan'im	350–330 BC	Son of an uncertain "Ham 'Athat"
50	Karib'il Watar VI	330–310 BC	Son of (49)
51	Wahhab Shamsam/Al-Yahiz	310–290 BC	Son of an unspecified "Halik 'Amar" although he has also been identified as the son of another unspecified personality named "Saraw"
52	Anmar Yuha'min I	290–270 BC	Son of (51)
53	Dhamar Ali Dharih II	270–250 BC	Son of (52)
54	Nasha'karib Yuha'min	250–230 BC	Son of (53)
—	Unknown	230–200 BC	A period of the time without any inscriptions dedicated to a ruler.
55	Nasir Yuhan'em	200–180 BC	
56	Dhamar Ali Bayin III		
57	Wahhab/Al-Yahiz II	180–160 BC	
58	Karib'il Watar Yuhan'im	160–145 BC	Son of (57).
59	Anmar Yuha'min II		Son of (57).
60	Yarim 'Aymin	145–115 BC	Son of an unspecified "Awsalat Rafshan" and he usurped the throne with his son
61	Alhan Nahfan		Son of (60) who usurped the throne alongside his father.
62	Far'am Yanhab	130–125 BC	Regained the legitimate throne of Saba'.

== Kings of Saba' & Dhu Raydan ==
	King	Reigned	Notes
63	Sha'ram Awtar		Son of (61).
64	Ilisharih Yahdhib		Son of (62). He was probably Strabo's "Ilasarus". Contemporary with Sha'ram Awtar, see (63).
65	Yazil Bayin		Son of (62). He allied with his brother see (64) against Sha'ram Awtar (63).
67	Hayu Athtar Yazi'		
68	Karib'il Watar Yuhan'im II		Son of (56). Probably the king Charibael of the Periplus of the Erythraean Sea, said to have dominion over the major ports of Azania (the Swahili coast) through a vassal located at Saba'.
69	Watar Yuha'min		Son of (64).
70	Dhamar Ali Dharih III		Son of (68).
71	Nasha'karib Yuha'min Yuhar'ib		Son of (64).
72	Karib'il Bayin II		Son of (68).
73	Yasir Yuhasdiq		
74	Sa'd Shams 'Asri		Son of (64).
75	Murthid Yuhahm'id		Son of (74).
76	Dhamar Ali Yahbur	135–175	Son of 73. His statue made by the Greek sculptors is well preserved and on display at the National Museum of Yemen.
77	Tha'ran Ya'ub Yuhan'im		Son of (76). Has a statue preserved in the National Museum of Yemen.
78	Dhamar Ali Yahbur II		Son of (77).
79	Shamdar Yuhan'im		
80	Amdan Bayin Yuhaqbiz		
81	Hutar Athat Yafish		
82	Karab Athat Yuhaqbiz		
83	Shahar Aymin		
84	Rabb Shams Nimran		
85	Al-Izz Nawfan Yuhasd'iq		
86	Sa'd Um Nimran		
87	Yasir Yuhan'im		

== Kings of Saba' & Dhu Raydan & Hadhramaut & Yamnat (2nd Himyarite Kingdom) ==
	King	Reigned	Notes
88	Shammar Yahr'ish	AD 275–300	Son of 87
89	Yarim Yuharhib		Son of 88
90	Yasir Yuhan'im III		Son of 88
91	Tharin Ayfi'		Son of 90
92	Dhara'amar Ayman I		Son of 90
93	Karabil Watar Yuhan'em III		
94	Tharin Yakrib		Son of 88
95	Dhamar Ali Yahbur II	321–324	Son of 94
96	Tharan Yuhanim	324–375	Son of 95

== King of Saba', Dhu Raydan, Hadramawt, Yamnat and their Arabs, on Tawdum (the high plateau) and Tihamat ==
This period of time is most famously featured in Arabian legends. This is also the last period of native Yemeni rule.

	King	Reigned	Notes
97	Malkikarib Yuhamin	375–400	Son of (96). He is the first king to officially convert to Judaism and remove previous polytheistic invocations from records and inscriptions. He also replaced the Great Temple of the pagan god Almaqah with a mikrāb for Jewish organization. Later tradition ascribes the conversion to Judaism to his son, Abu Karib.
98	Abu Karib As'ad	390–440	Son of (97). Judaism was made the state religion during his rule. Some Arab traditions relate that he was the first ruler to put a covering over the Kaaba during his attempted invasion of Mecca.
99	Hassan Yuha'min	440–450	Son of (98). He shared kingship with his brother Sharhabil Yafar for a while.
100	Sharhabil Yafar	450–465	Son of (98). Known as 'Amr in the Arabian folklore and traditions.
101	Sharhabil Yakkuf	465–480	He is believed to have started a new dynasty, as his patronymic is not mentioned in any inscription. Sharhabil Yakkuf is also featured in Ethiopian folklore as being a king who accepted Judaism and persecuted the Christians living in Arabia.
102	Lakhni'ah Yanuf	480–502	He is the son of (101) and did start off his political career by sharing the royal power with his father and other two brothers, Abu Shamir Nawaf and Ma'dikarib Yun'im. Some inscriptions also cite him as being from the Dhu Hasbah/Dhu Asbah tribe.
103	Marthad'ilan Yu'nim	502–504	He is the son of (102) and helped to build a synagogue for the local Jewish community, as well as repaired a local place of worship as stated in Inscription YM 1200.
104	Marthad'ilan Yanuf	504–515	A Christian, he engaged in diplomatic relations with the Kingdom of Aksum.
105	Ma'dikarib Ya'fur	515–517	He was appointed as a king by the Aksumite Empire. In the Arabian folklore, Ma'dikarib Ya'fur does not exist, and is instead replaced by an unknown Dhu Shanatir.
106	Dhu Nuwas	517–530	The last of the native Himyarite kings, he rose to power in 517 after assassinating (104). His real name was Yusuf As'ar Yathar and his father was an unknown Sharhabil, thought to have been Sharhabil Yakkuf (101). He was known for his persecutions of Christians. He was killed in the year 530 during the Aksumite conquest of Yemen by King Kaleb.

== Aksumite rulers of Saba' and Himyar ==
After the Aksumites successfully invaded and subsequently took control of Yemen, they appointed a native Christian as the vassal ruler of Saba' and Himyar. However, later on actual Abyssinians would rule Saba' and Himyar temporarily until the Sasanian Empire conquered Yemen under request from the native Yemenis.

	King	Reigned	Notes
107	Sumyafa Ashwa	530–535	A native from Himyar who had converted to Christianity, Sumyafa Ashwa was appointed by Kaleb as the ruler of Saba' and Himyar. He was deposed and overthrown in 535 by Abraha, who usurped the throne from him.
108	Abraha	535–570	A usurper to the throne, he deposed Sumyafa Ashwa by force and imprisoned him. He also turned against Kaleb, but they later reconciled and he was allowed to keep his throne. He is best known for his attempted invasion of Mecca, a famous story in Islamic literature and exegesis.
109	Yaksum ibn Abraha	570–571	Son of Abraha, he ruled for no more than one year, as he ascended the throne in 570, but died the following year.
110	Masruq ibn Abraha	571–572	Son of Abraha and the brother of Yaksum. After his brother's death, he took the throne. During this time period, the native Yemenis revolted against him and later on, they were assisted by forces from the Persian Sasanian Empire. Masruq was ultimately killed in the attack by the invading Persian army, ending Aksumite rule over Himyar.

== Vassal rulers of the Sasanian Empire ==
	King	Reigned	Notes
111	Ma'adi Yakrib ibn Abi Murrah	572–575	Appointed as a vassal king by the Sasanian Empire. He until he was stabbed to death by an Abyssinian servant whom he had hired. After his death, his son Ma'dikarib was made a temporary ruler of Yemen, according to Encyclopaedia Iranica

== See also ==
- List of pre-Islamic Arabian deities
- List of wars and battles in pre-Islamic Arabia
