= Tharan Yuhanim =

Thaʾrān Yuhanʿim
- King of the Himyarite Kingdom
- Reign: 324–375 CE
- Predecessor: Dhamar Ali Yahbur II
- Successor: Malkikarib Yuhamin
- Died: c. 375; Yemen
- Father: Dhamar Ali Yuhabirr

Thaʾrān Yuhanʿim (c. 324–375) was a king (Tubba', Arabic: تُبَّع) of the Himyarite Kingdom (in modern-day Yemen), and was the second king of the new dynasty founded by his father Dhamar Ali Yahbur II. He had an unusually long reign, on the order of fifty to fifty-five years and his son, Malkikarib Yuhamin, appears to have entered the throne at an advanced age.

Iwona Gajda has proposed that the oldest known monotheistic Himyarite inscription (YM 1950), dating either to 363 or 373, comes from his reign. More recently, Christian Julien Robin has identified an earlier monotheistic inscription from his reign that dates earlier than 355.

Byzantine historians more prominently know of a conversion to Judaism during the reign of his son and successor, Malkikarib.

He is known to the Islamic-era Yemeni traditionalist al-Hasan al-Hamdani as Yunʿim Tārān, and was conceived by this author to be the founder of a dynasty. He is also known to Muhammad ibn Habib al-Baghdadi as Bārān Yuhanʿim in his al-Muḥabbar.

== Inscriptions ==
Tharan Yuhanim is known from the following inscriptions (though he authors none of them):

- Maṣnaʿat Māriya 1
  - This inscription invokes Tharan as sole ruler, though it is possible he had a coregent.
- ʿAbadān 1
  - Commemorates military achievements of a prominent family from eastern Yemen that were made over the course of three generations.
- YM 1950
  - This inscription provides evidence that some high-ranking officials already adhered to monotheism. The king is invoked here with more than one, and so this inscription likely dates to the latter part of the reign of Tharan.
- JA 669
- JA 670
- JA 671 + 788
- DhM 201
- DhM 204
- MQ Minkath 1
- Khaldūn Balās 1.

== See also ==
- Constantius II
- Dhu Nuwas
- Judaism in pre-Islamic Arabia
