= Dhamar Ali Yahbur =

Dhamarʿalī Yuhabirr
- king of Sabaʾ and ḏu-Raydān
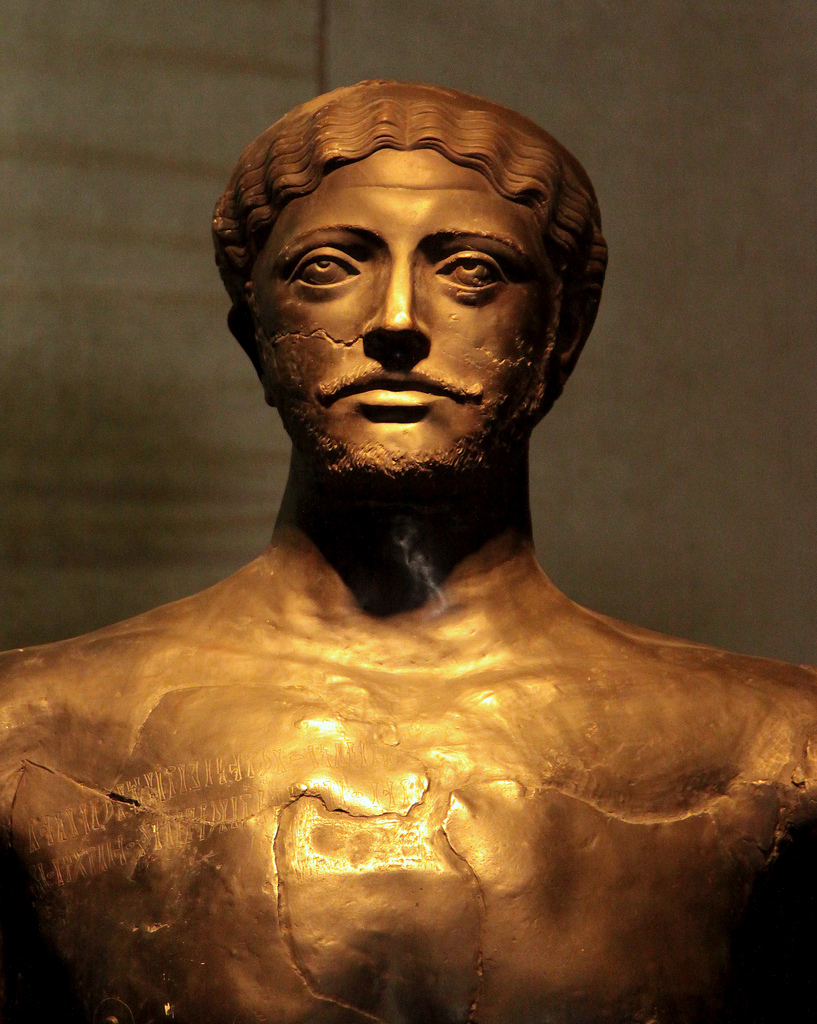
- A bronze statue of Dhamar Ali Yahbur, displayed in the National Museum of Yemen
- Reign: c. 135 – 175
- Predecessor: Yāsir Yuhaṣdiq
- Successor: Tharan Yaub Yuhanim
- Died: c. 175; South Arabian
- Religion: South Arabian polytheism

Dhamarʿalī Yuhabirr bin Yāsir Yuhaṣdiq (Ḏmrʿly Yhbr), was the king of Saba' and ḏu-Raydān from c. 135 to 175 CE. He ascended the Himyarite throne amidst clashes between Sabaʾ and Ḥimyar. The earliest mention of Dhamarʿalī Yuhabirr appears in an inscription dated to 137. He ascends to the throne no later than 159.

In the middle of the 2nd century, Dhamarʿalī Yuhabirr and his son Tharan Yaub Yuhanim controlled Kingdom of Saba. During his rule, reports show repairs were made to the irrigation-works (dam) at Marib. Dhamarʿalī Yuhabirr handed his throne down to his son Thaʾrān Yaʿub, who succeeded him around 175.

Bronze statues of the king Dhamar'alî Yuhabirr and Tha'rân were found in an-Nakhla al-Hamrâ in the Dhamar Governorate of Yemen. Sabaic inscriptions on Dhamar Ali's statue reads "the two kings of Sabaʾ and ḏu-Raydān, placed what they granted to their vassals" and "S²rḥs¹myd and Mgdm, of the family Ḏrnḥ, in the hall of their palace".
