= Lakhni'ah Yanuf =

Lakhni'ah Yanuf al-Himyari
- King of Saba', Dhu Raydan, Hadramawt, Yamnat and their Arabs, on Tawdum and Tihamat
- Reign: 480–502 CE
- Predecessor: Sharhabil Yakkuf
- Successor: Marthad'ilan Yu'nim
- Died: c. 502; Yemen
- Issue: Marthad'ilan Yu'nim
Names
- Lakhni'ah ibn Sharhabil Yakkuf al-Himyari
- Father: Sharhabil Yakkuf
- Religion: Judaism

Lakhni'ah Yanuf al-Himyari (Arabic: لحيعة ينوف الحميري) was a Himyarite prince who lived in the late fifth century. He first entered leadership as part of a co-regency with his father, Sharhabil Yakkuf, and his two brothers, Abu Shamir Nawaf and Ma'dikarib Yun'im.

== Reign ==
Lakhni'ah Yanuf, the son of Sharhabil Yakkuf, shared the royal title King of Saba', Dhu Raydan, Hadramawt, Yamnat and their Arabs, on Tawdum and Tihamat with his father and two brothers, Abu Shamir Nawaf and Ma'dikarib Yun'im. Eventually, the name of Abu Shamir Nawaf disappears from the royal title, leaving only Lakhni'ah Yanuf and Ma'dikarib Yun'im; the former is given more precedence over the other hence making him the legal heir of the throne. The last inscription mentioning Lakhni'ah Yanuf is dated to 502 CE and does not mention him as a king, implying that he is retired from leadership.

Lakhni'ah Yanuf is the second ruler in Sharhabil Yakkuf's dynasty. He would eventually be succeeded by his son, Marthad'ilan Yu'nim.

== Military campaigns ==
In the year 474 CE, alongside his father and two brothers, Lakhni'ah Yanuf participated in a campaign against rebellious Arab tribes which included branches of the Tayy and Abd al-Qays, as well as a double attack against the Lakhmid king 'Amr ibn al-Aswad. Four hundred camels were taken from the rebellious tribes as war booty.

== See also ==
- List of rulers of Saba' and Himyar
