= Periplus of the Erythraean Sea =

1st-century Greco-Roman document

The Periplus of the Erythraean Sea (Koine Greek: Περίπλους τῆς Ἐρυθρᾶς Θαλάσσης, romanized: Períplous tē̂s Erythrâs Thalássēs), also known by its Latin name as the Periplus Maris Erythraei, is a Greco-Roman periplus written in Koine Greek, in the first century, that describes navigation and trading opportunities from Roman Egyptian ports like Berenice Troglodytica along the coast of the Red Sea and others along the Horn of Africa, the Persian Gulf, Arabian Sea and the Indian Ocean, including the modern-day Sindh region of Pakistan and southwestern regions of India.

The text has been ascribed to different dates between the first and third centuries, but a mid-first-century date is now the most commonly accepted. According to orientalist writer William Mac Guckin Slane, the Periplus was likely written by an Egyptian Greek sailor. Classical scholar Wilfred Harvey Schoff and historian Dionisius Agius both date it to around AD 60. It was first translated by Wilfred Harvey Schoff in 1912.

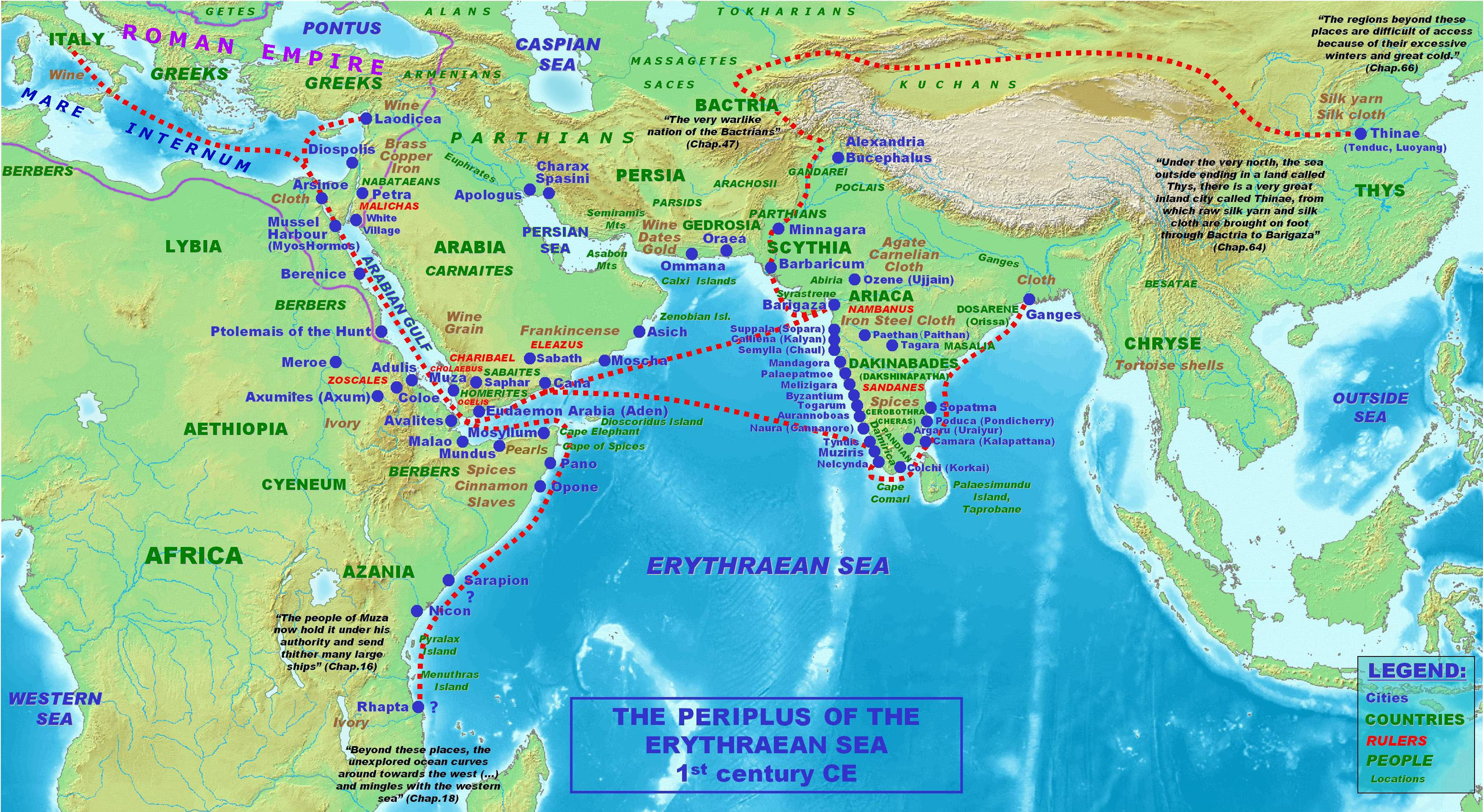
Names, routes and locations of the Periplus of the Erythraean Sea

== Name ==
A periplus (Koine Greek: περίπλους, romanized: períplous, lit. 'a sailing-around') is a logbook recording sailing itineraries and commercial, political, and ethnological details about the ports visited. In an era before maps were in general use, it functioned as a combination of atlas and traveller's handbook.

The Erythraean Sea (Koine Greek: Ἐρυθρὰ Θάλασσα, romanized: Erythrà Thálassa, lit. 'Red Sea') was an ancient geographical designation that always included the Gulf of Aden between Arabia Felix and the Horn of Africa and was often extended (as in this periplus) to include the present-day Red Sea, Persian Gulf, and Indian Ocean as a single maritime area.

== Date and authorship ==
The 10th-century Byzantine manuscript which forms the basis of present knowledge of the Periplus attributes the work to Arrian, but apparently for no better reason than its position beside Arrian's much later Periplus of the Euxine Sea.

One historical analysis, published by Wilfred Harvey Schoff in 1912, narrowed the date of the text to AD 59–62, in agreement with present-day estimates of the middle of the 1st century. Schoff additionally provides a historical analysis as to the text's original authorship, and arrives at the conclusion that the author was a "Greek in Egypt, a Roman subject". By Schoff's calculations, this would have been during the time of Tiberius Claudius Balbilus, who coincidentally also was an Egyptian Greek.

Schoff continues by noting that the author could not have been "a highly educated man" as "is evident from his frequent confusion of Greek and Latin words and his clumsy and sometimes ungrammatical constructions". Because of "the absence of any account of the journey up the Nile and across the desert from Coptos", Schoff prefers to pinpoint the author's residence to "Berenice rather than Alexandria".

The 19th century Arabist and archaeologist Eduard Glaser identified the obscure Greek writer Basilis as the author. Schoff disagreed strongly with this.

John Hill maintains that "the Periplus can now be confidently dated to between AD 40 and 70 and, probably, between AD 40 and 50." This dating corresponds with the argumentation of L. Casson ("between A.D. 40 and 70") in his key book The Periplus Maris Erythraei: Text with Introduction, Translation and Commentary.

== Synopsis ==
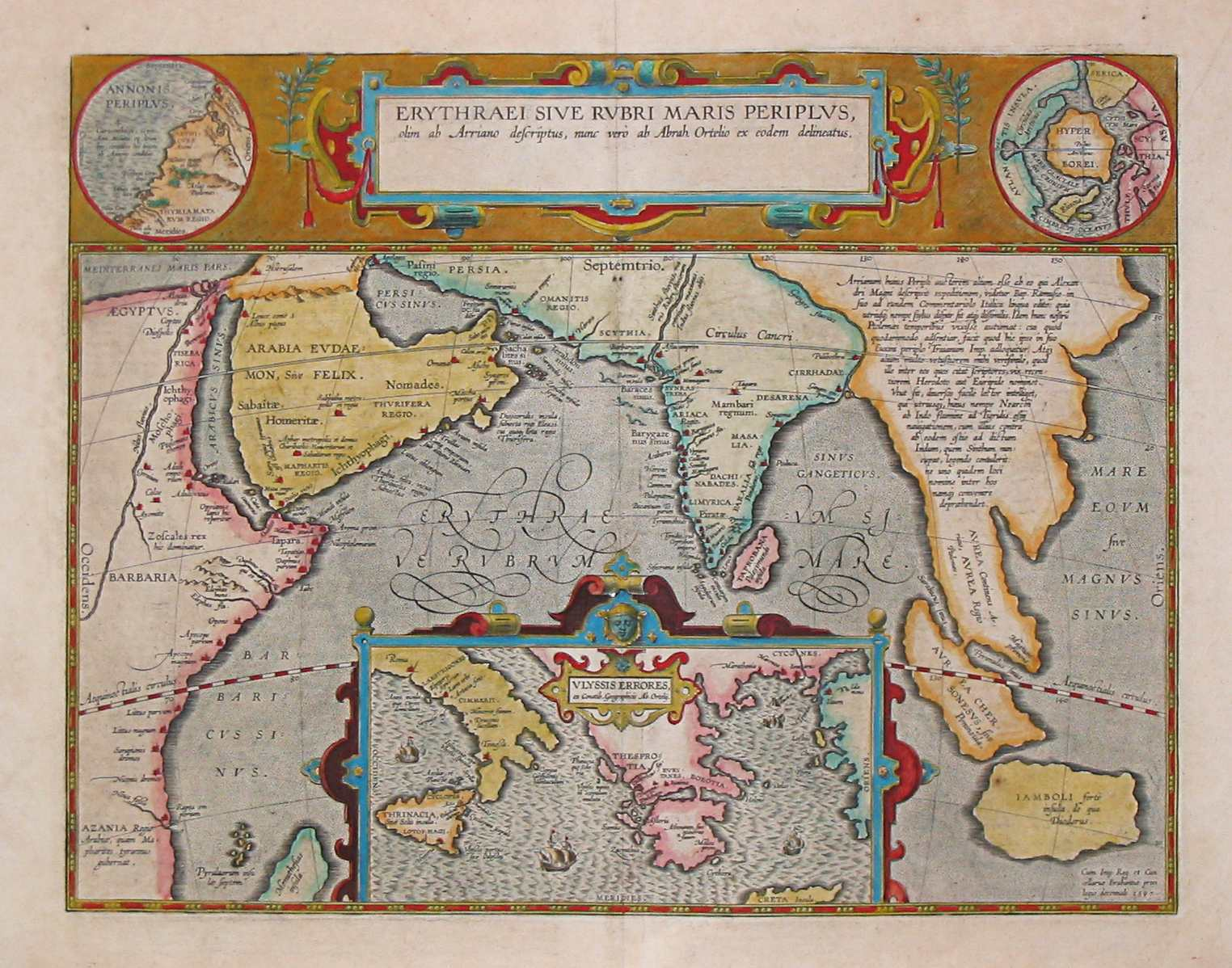
1597 map depicting the locations of the Periplus of the Erythraean Sea

The work consists of 66 sections, most of them about the length of a long paragraph. For instance, the short section 9 reads in its entirety:

From Malao (Berbera) it is two courses to the mart of Moundou, where ships anchor more safely by an island lying very close to the land. The imports to this are as aforesaid [Chapter 8 mentions iron, gold, silver, drinking cups, etc.], and from it likewise are exported the same goods [Chapter 8 mentions myrrh, douaka, makeir, and slaves], and fragrant gum called mokrotou (cf. Sanskrit makaranda). The inhabitants who trade here are more stubborn.

In many cases, the description of places is sufficiently accurate to identify their present locations; for others, there is considerable debate. For instance, "Rhapta" is mentioned as the farthest market down the African coast of "Azania", but there are at least five locations matching the description, ranging from Tanga to south of the Rufiji River delta. The description of the Indian coast mentions the Ganges River clearly, yet after that it is ambiguous, describing China as a "great inland city Thina" that is a source of raw silk.

The Periplus says that a direct sailing route from the Red Sea to the Indian peninsula across the open ocean was discovered by Hippalus (1st century BC).

Many trade goods are mentioned in the Periplus, but some of the words naming trade goods are found nowhere else in ancient literature, leading to guesswork as to what they might be. For example, one trade good mentioned is "lakkos chromatinos". The name lakkos appears nowhere else in ancient Greek or Roman literature. The name re-surfaces in late medieval Latin as lacca, borrowed from medieval Arabic lakk in turn borrowed from Sanskritic lakh, meaning lac i.e. a red-coloured resin native to India used as a lacquer and used also as a red colourant. Some other named trade goods remain obscure.

=== Himyarite kingdom and Saba ===
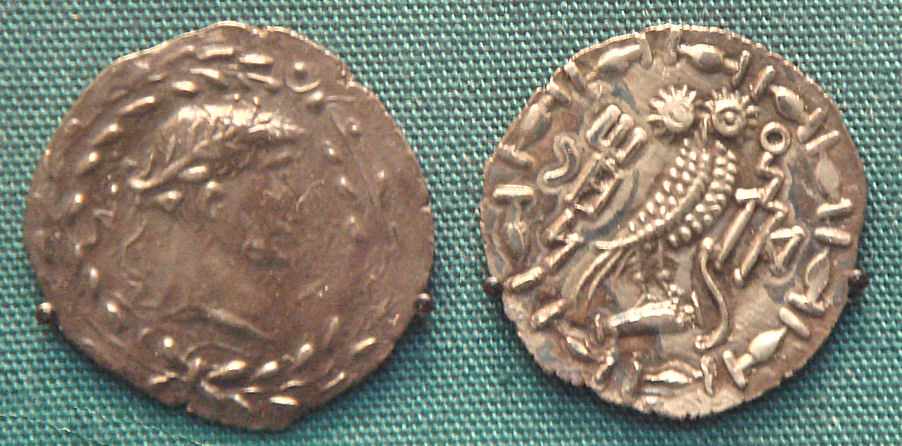
Coin of the Himyarite Kingdom, southern coast of the Arabian Peninsula, in which ships stopped when passing between Egypt and India. This is an imitation of a coin of Augustus, 1st century

Ships from Himyar regularly travelled the East African coast. The Periplus of the Erythraean Sea describes the trading empire of Himyar and Saba, regrouped under a single ruler, "Charibael" (probably Karab'il Watar Yuhan'em II), who is said to have been on friendly terms with Rome:

23. And after nine days more there is Saphar, the metropolis, in which lives Charibael, lawful king of two tribes, the Homerites and those living next to them, called the Sabaites; through continual embassies and gifts, he is a friend of the Emperors.

— Periplus of the Erythraean Sea, §23.

=== Frankincense kingdom ===
The Frankincense kingdom is described further east along the southern coast of the Arabian Peninsula, with the harbour of Cana (South Arabic Qana, modern Bi'r Ali in Hadramaut). The ruler of this kingdom is named Eleazus, or Eleazar, thought to correspond to King Iliazz Yalit I:

27. After Eudaemon Arabia there is a continuous length of coast, and a bay extending two thousand stadia or more, along which there are Nomads and Fish-Eaters living in villages; just beyond the cape projecting from this bay there is another market-town by the shore, Cana, of the Kingdom of Eleazus, the Frankincense Country; and facing it there are two desert islands, one called Island of Birds, the other Dome Island, one hundred and twenty stadia from Cana. Inland from this place lies the metropolis Sabbatha, in which the King lives. All the frankincense produced in the country is brought by camels to that place to be stored, and to Cana on rafts held up by inflated skins after the manner of the country, and in boats. And this place has a trade also with the far-side ports, with Barygaza and Scythia and Ommana and the neighboring coast of Persia.

— Periplus of the Erythraean Sea, §27

=== Somalia ===
Ras Hafun in northern Somalia is believed to be the location of the ancient trade centre of Opōnē. Ancient Egyptian, Roman and Persian Gulf pottery has been recovered from the site by an archaeological team from the University of Michigan. Opōnē is in the thirteenth entry of the Periplus of the Erythraean Sea, which in part states:

And then, after sailing four hundred stadia along a promontory, toward which place the current also draws you, there is another market-town called Opone, into which the same things are imported as those already mentioned, and in it the greatest quantity of cinnamon is produced, (the arebo and moto), and slaves of the better sort, which are brought to Egypt in increasing numbers; and a great quantity of tortoiseshell, better than that found elsewhere.

— Periplus of the Erythraean Sea, §13

In ancient times, Opōnē operated as a port of call for merchants from Phoenicia, ancient Egypt, ancient Greece, Persia, Yemen, Nabataea, Azania, the Roman Empire, and elsewhere, as it possessed a strategic location along the coastal route from Azania to the Red Sea. Merchants from as far afield as Indonesia and Malaysia passed through Opōnē, trading spices, silks and other goods, before departing south for Azania or north to South Arabia or Egypt on the trade routes that spanned the length of the Indian Ocean's rim. As early as AD 50, Opōnē was well known as a center for the cinnamon trade, along with the trading of cloves and other spices, ivory, exotic animal skins and incense.

The ancient port city of Malao, situated in present-day Berbera in northern Somalia, is also mentioned in the Periplus:

After Avalites there is another market-town, better than this, called Malao, distant a sail of about eight hundred stadia. The anchorage is an open roadstead, sheltered by a spit running out from the east. Here the natives are more peaceable. There are imported into this place the things already mentioned, and many tunics, cloaks from Arsinoe, dressed and dyed; drinking-cups, sheets of soft copper in small quantity, iron, and gold and silver coin, not much. There are exported from these places myrrh, a little frankincense, (that known as far-side), the harder cinnamon, duaca, Indian copal and macir, which are imported into Arabia; and slaves, but rarely.

— Periplus of the Erythraean Sea, §8

=== Aksum Empire ===
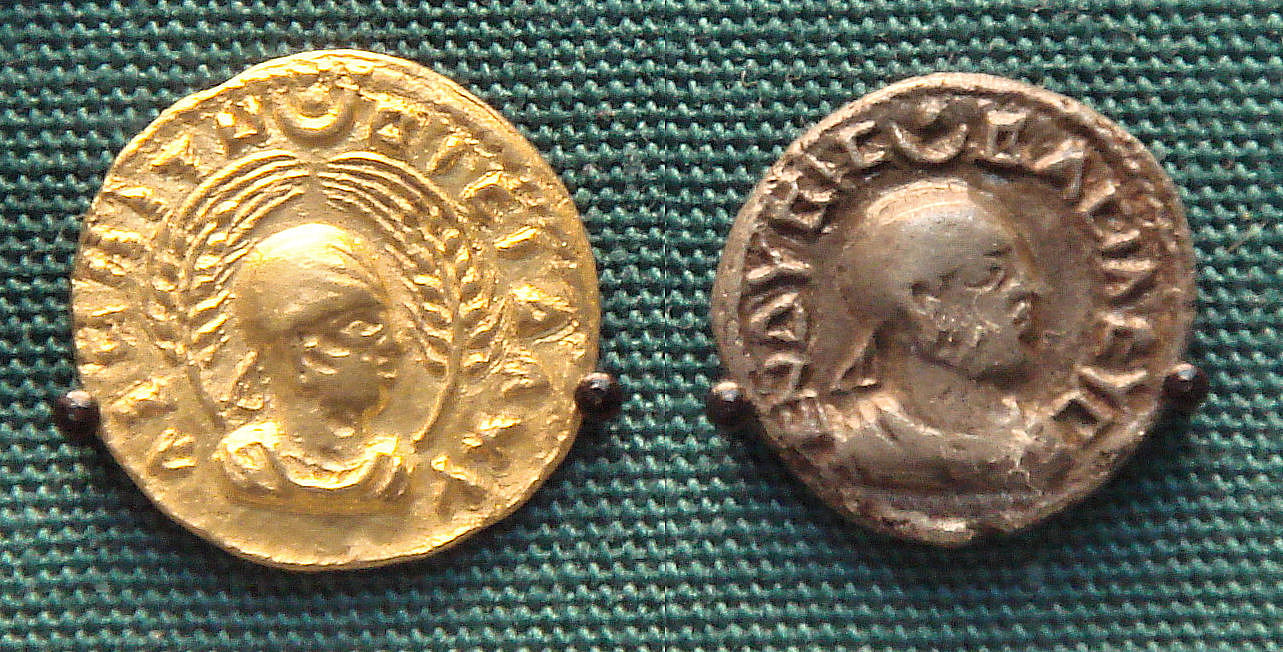
Coins of king Endybis, AD 227–235. British Museum. The left one reads in Greek "ΑΞΩΜΙΤΩ ΒΑϹΙΛΕΥϹ", "King of Axum". The right one reads in Greek: "ΕΝΔΥΒΙϹ ΒΑϹΙΛΕΥϹ", "King Endybis".

Aksum is mentioned in the Periplus as an important market place for ivory, which was exported throughout the ancient world:

From that place to the city of the people called Auxumites there is a five days' journey more; to that place all the ivory is brought from the country beyond the Nile through the district called Cyeneum, and thence to Adulis.

— Periplus of the Erythraean Sea, §4

According to the Periplus, the ruler of Aksum was Zoscales, who, besides ruling in Aksum also held under his sway two harbours on the Red Sea: Adulis (near Massawa) and Avalites (Assab). He is also said to have been familiar with Greek literature:

These places, from the Calf-Eaters to the other Berber country, are governed by Zoscales; who is miserly in his ways and always striving for more, but otherwise upright, and acquainted with Greek literature.

— Periplus of the Erythraean Sea, §5

=== Rhapta ===
==== Rufiji (Tanzania) theory ====
One possible location of Rhapta in Africa

Research by the Tanzanian archaeologist Felix A. Chami has uncovered remains of Roman trade items near the mouth of the Rufiji River and the nearby Mafia Island, and makes a case that the ancient port of Rhapta was situated on the banks of the Rufiji River just south of Dar es Salaam.

The Periplus informs us that:

Two runs beyond this island [Menuthias = Zanzibar?] comes the very last port of trade on the coast of Azania, called Rhapta ["sewn"], a name derived from the aforementioned sewn boats, where there are great quantities of ivory and tortoise shell.

Chami summarizes the evidence for Rhapta's location as follows:

The actual location of the Azanian capital, Rhapta, remains unknown. However, archaeological indicators reported above suggest that it was located on the coast of Tanzania, in the region of the Rufiji River and Mafia Island. It is in this region where the concentration of Panchaea/Azanian period settlements has been discovered. If the island of Menuthias mentioned in the Periplus was Zanzibar, a short voyage south would land one in the Rufiji region. The 2nd-century geographer Ptolemy locates Rhapta at latitude 8° south, which is the exact latitude of the Rufiji Delta and Mafia Island. The metropolis was on the mainland about one degree west of the coast near a large river and a bay with the same name. While the river should be regarded as the modern Rufiji River, the bay should definitely be identified with the calm waters between the island of Mafia and the Rufiji area. The peninsula east of Rhapta would have been the northern tip of Mafia Island. The southern part of the bay is protected from the deep sea by numerous deltaic small islets separated from Mafia Island by shallow and narrow channels. To the north the bay is open to the sea and any sailor entering the waters from that direction would feel as if he were entering a bay. Even today the residents identify these waters as a bay, referring to it as a 'female sea', as opposed to the more violent open sea on the other side of the island of Mafia.

Felix Chami has found archaeological evidence for extensive Roman trade on Mafia Island and, not far away, on the mainland, near the mouth of the Rufiji River, which he dated to the first few centuries. Furthermore, J. Innes Miller points out that Roman coins have been found on Pemba Island, just north of Rhapta.

==== Quelimane (Mozambique) theory ====
Carl Peters has argued that Rhapta was near modern-day Quelimane in Mozambique, citing the fact that (according to the Periplus) the coastline there ran down towards the southwest. Peters also suggests that the description of the "Pyralaoi" (i.e., the "Fire people") – "situated at the entry to the [Mozambique] Channel" – indicates that they were the inhabitants of the volcanic Comoro Islands. He also maintains that Menuthias (with its abundance of rivers and crocodiles) cannot have been Zanzibar; i.e., Madagascar seems more likely.

==== Himyaro-Sabaean suzerainty ====
The Periplus informs us that Rhapta was under the firm control of a governor appointed by Arabian king of Musa, taxes were collected, and it was serviced by "merchant craft that they staff mostly with Arab skippers and agents who, through continual intercourse and intermarriage, are familiar with the area and its language".

The Periplus explicitly states that Azania (which included Rhapta) was subject to "Charibael", the king of both the Sabaeans and Homerites in the southwest corner of Arabia. The kingdom is known to have been a Roman ally at this period. Charibael is stated in the Periplus to be "a friend of the (Roman) emperors, thanks to continuous embassies and gifts" and, therefore, Azania could fairly be described as a vassal or dependency of Rome, just as Zesan is described in the 3rd-century Chinese history, the Weilüe.

=== Bharuch ===
Location of Barygaza in India

Trade with the Indian harbour of Barygaza is described extensively in the Periplus. Nahapana, ruler of the Indo-Scythian Western Satraps is mentioned under the name Nambanus, as ruler of the area around Barigaza:

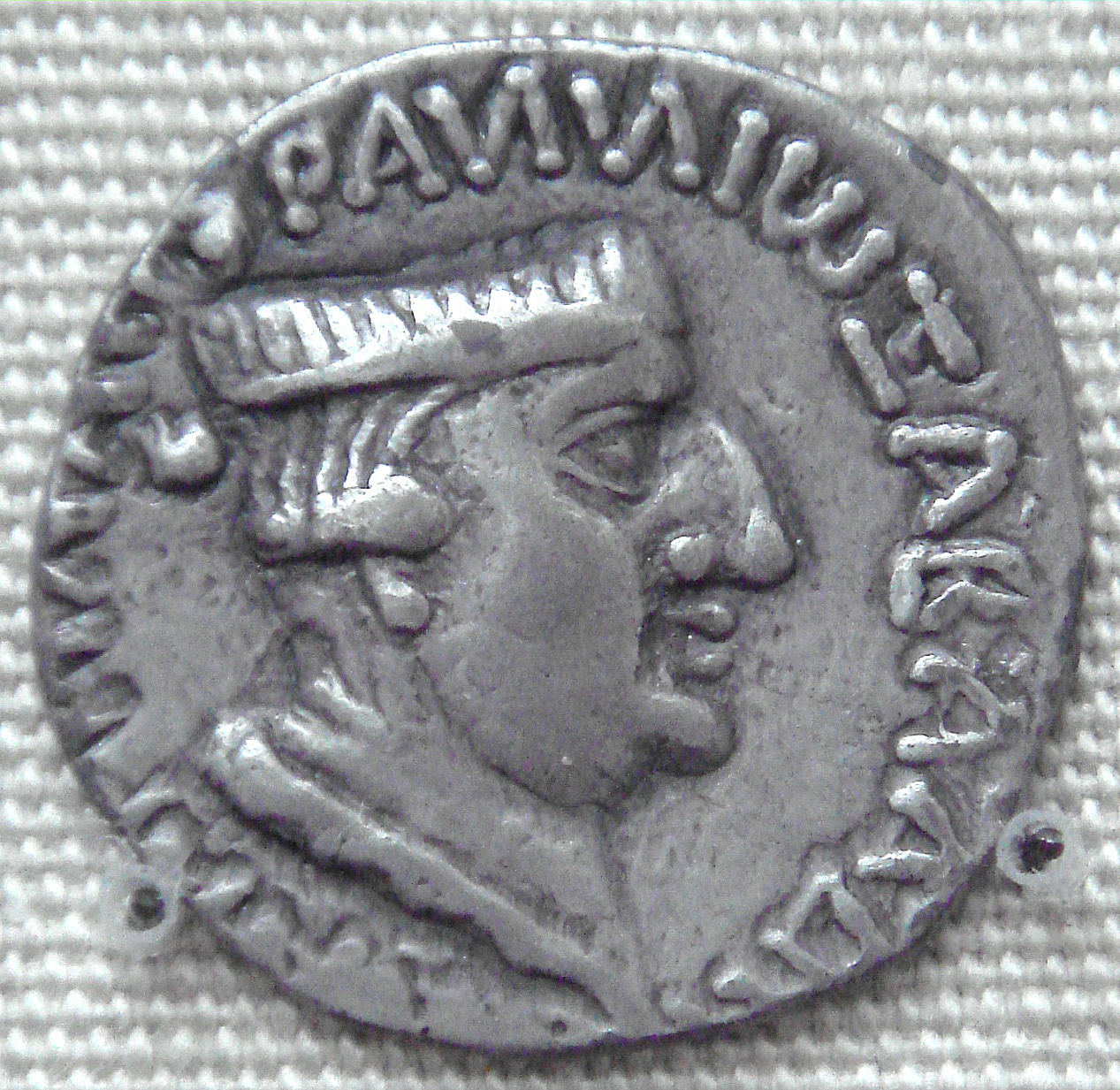
Coin of Nahapana (AD 119–124). Obv: Bust of king Nahapana with a legend in Greek script "ΡΑΝΝΙΩ ΞΑΗΑΡΑΤΑϹ ΝΑΗΑΠΑΝΑϹ", transliteration of the Prakrit Raño Kshaharatasa Nahapanasa: "King Kshaharata Nahapana".

41. Beyond the gulf of Baraca is that of Barygaza and the coast of the country of Ariaca, which is the beginning of the Kingdom of Nambanus and of all India. That part of it lying inland and adjoining Scythia is called Abiria, but the coast is called Syrastrene. It is a fertile country, yielding wheat and rice and sesame oil and clarified butter, cotton and the Indian cloths made therefrom, of the coarser sorts. Very many cattle are pastured there, and the men are of great stature and black in color. The metropolis of this country is Minnagara, from which much cotton cloth is brought down to Barygaza.

— Periplus of the Erythraean Sea, §41

Under the Western Satraps, Barigaza was one of the main centres of Roman trade in the subcontinent. The Periplus describes the many goods exchanged:

49. There are imported into this market-town (Barigaza), wine, Italian preferred, also Laodicean and Arabian; copper, tin, and lead; coral and topaz; thin clothing and inferior sorts of all kinds; bright-colored girdles a cubit wide; storax, sweet clover, flint glass, realgar, antimony, gold and silver coin, on which there is a profit when exchanged for the money of the country; and ointment, but not very costly and not much. And for the King there are brought into those places very costly vessels of silver, singing boys, beautiful maidens for the harem, fine wines, thin clothing of the finest weaves, and the choicest ointments. There are exported from these places spikenard, costus [Saussurea costus], bdellium, ivory, agate and carnelian, lycium, cotton cloth of all kinds, silk cloth, mallow cloth, yarn, long pepper and such other things as are brought here from the various market-towns. Those bound for this market-town from Egypt make the voyage favorably about the month of July, that is Epiphi.

— Periplus of the Erythraean Sea, §49.

Goods were also brought down in quantity from Ujjain, the capital of the Western Satraps:

48. Inland from this place and to the east, is the city called Ozene, formerly a royal capital; from this place are brought down all things needed for the welfare of the country about Barygaza, and many things for our trade: agate and carnelian, Indian muslins and mallow cloth, and much ordinary cloth.

— Periplus of the Erythraean Sea, §48.

=== Early Chera, Pandyan, and Chola kingdoms ===
Location of Muziris in India

The lost port city of Muziris (near present day Kodungallur) in the Chera kingdom, as well as the Early Pandyan Kingdom are mentioned in the Periplus as major centres of trade, pepper and other spices, metal work and semiprecious stones, between Damirica and the Roman Empire.

According to the Periplus, numerous Greek seamen managed an intense trade with Muziris:

Then come Naura (Kannur) and Tyndis, the first markets of Damirica or Limyrike, and then Muziris and Nelcynda, which are now of leading importance. Tyndis is of the Kingdom of Cerobothra; it is a village in plain sight by the sea. Muziris, of the same kingdom, abounds in ships sent there with cargoes from Arabia, and by the Greeks; it is located on a river (River Periyar), distant from Tyndis by river and sea five hundred stadia, and up the river from the shore twenty stadia. Nelcynda is distant from Muziris by river and sea about five hundred stadia, and is of another Kingdom, the Pandian. This place also is situated on a river, about one hundred and twenty stadia from the sea ...

— The Periplus of the Erythraean Sea, 53–54

According to the Periplus of the Erythraean Sea (53:17:15-27), Limyrike began at Naura and Tyndis; Ptolemy (7.1.8) mentions only Tyndis as its starting point. The region probably ended at Kanyakumari; it thus roughly corresponds to the present-day Malabar Coast. Further, this area served as a hub for trade with the interior, in the Gangetic plain:

Besides this there are ex-ported great quantities of fine pearls, ivory, silk cloth, spikenard from the Ganges, malabathrum from the places in the interior, transparent stones of all kinds, diamonds and sapphires, and tortoise-shell; that from Chryse Island, and that taken among the islands along the coast of Damirica (Limyrike). They make the voyage to this place in a favorable season who set out from Egypt about the month of July, that is Epiphi.

— The Periplus of the Erythraean Sea, 56

=== Indian–Chinese border ===
The Periplus also describes the annual fair in present-day Northeast India, on the border with China.

Every year there turns up at the border of Thina, a certain tribe, short in body and very flat-faced ... called Sêsatai ... They come with their wives and children bearing great packs resembling mats of green leaves and then remain at some spot on the border between them and those on the Thina side, and they hold a festival for several days, spreading out the mats under them, and then take off for their own homes in the interior.

— Periplus, §65

Sêsatai are the source of malabathron. Schoff's translation mentions them as Besatae: they are a people similar to Kirradai and they lived in the region between "Assam and Sichuan".

The [? locals], counting on this, then turn up in the area, collect what the Sêsatai had spread out, extract the fibers from the reeds, which are called petroi, and lightly doubling over the leaves and rolling them into ball-like shapes, they string them on the fibers from the reeds. There are three grades: what is called big-ball malabathron from the bigger leaves; medium-ball from the lesser leaves; and small-ball from the smaller. Thus three grades of malabathron are produced, and then they are transported into India by the people who make them.

— Periplus, §65

=== Remains of the Indo-Greek kingdom ===
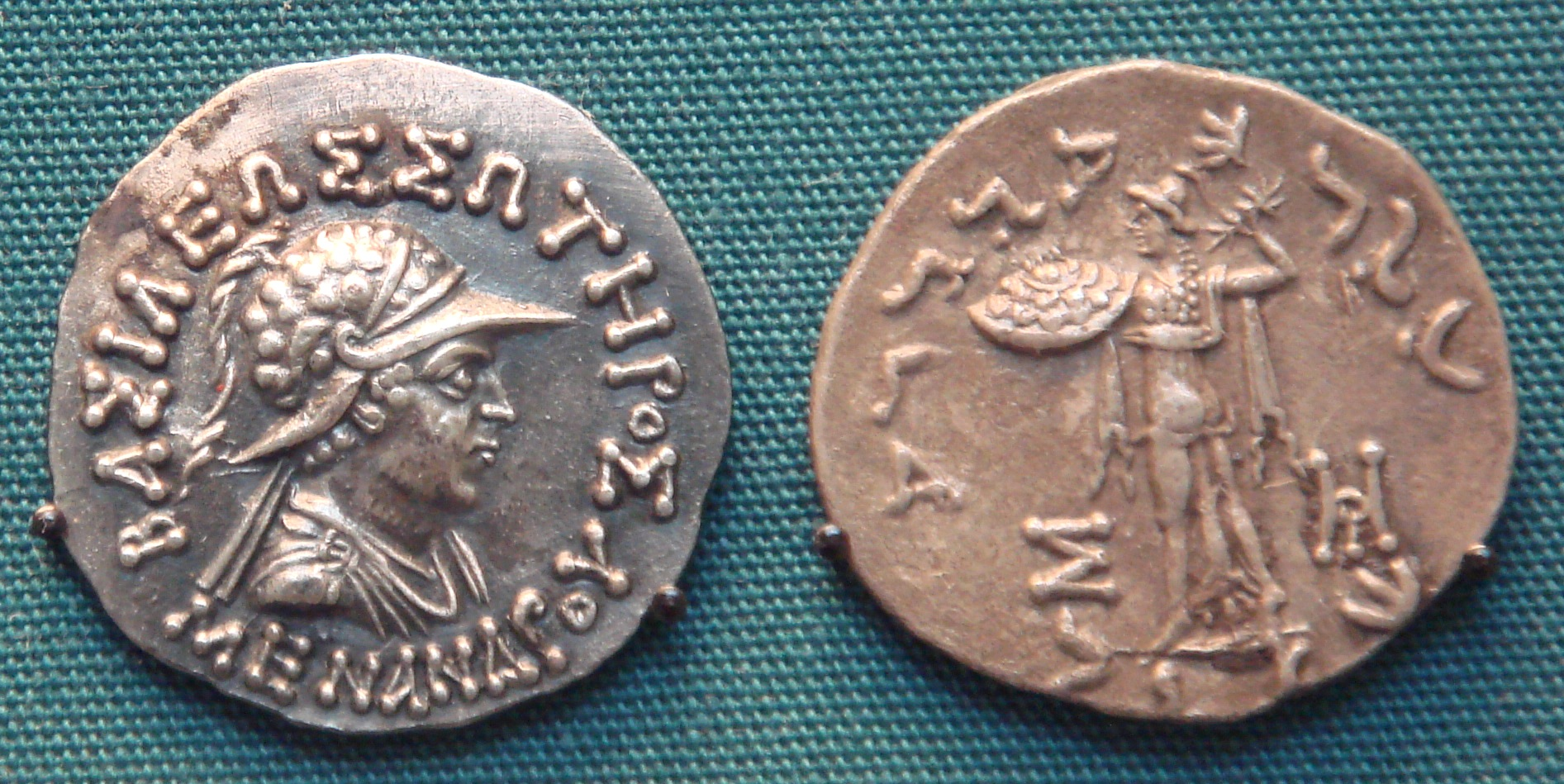
The Periplus explains that coins of the Indo-Greek king Menander I were current in Barigaza.

The Periplus claims that Greek buildings and wells exist in Barigaza, falsely attributing them to Alexander the Great, who never went this far south. This account of a kingdom tracing its beginnings to Alexander's campaigns and the Hellenistic Seleucid Empire that followed:

The metropolis of this country is Minnagara, from which much cotton cloth is brought down to Barygaza. In these places there remain even to the present time signs of the expedition of Alexander, such as ancient shrines, walls of forts and great wells.

— Periplus, §41

The Periplus further claims to the circulation of Indo-Greek coinage in the region:

To the present day ancient drachmae are current in Barygaza, coming from this country, bearing inscriptions in Greek letters, and the devices of those who reigned after Alexander, Apollodorus [sic] and Menander.

— Periplus, §47

The Greek city of Alexandria Bucephalous on the Jhelum River is mentioned in the Periplus, as well as in the Roman Peutinger Table:

The country inland of Barigaza is inhabited by numerous tribes, such as the Arattii, the Arachosii, the Gandaraei and the people of Poclais, in which is Bucephalus Alexandria

— Periplus of the Erythraean Sea, §47

== Manuscripts ==
The Periplus was originally known only through a single manuscript dating from the 14th or 15th century, now held by the British Library. This manuscript proved to be a corrupt and error-ridden copy of a 10th-century Byzantine manuscript in minuscule hand. The 10th-century manuscript placed it beside Arrian's Periplus of the Euxine Sea and (apparently mistakenly) also credited Arrian with writing it as well. The Byzantine manuscript was taken from Heidelberg to Rome during the Thirty Years' War (1618–1648), then to Paris under Napoleon after his army's conquest of the Papal States in the late 1790s, then returned to Heidelberg's University Library in 1816 where it remains.

== Editions ==
The British manuscript was edited by Sigmund Gelen (Czech: Zikmund Hruby z Jeleni) in Prague and first published by Hieronymus Froben in 1533. This error-ridden text served as the basis for other editions and translations for three centuries, until the restoration of the original manuscript to Heidelberg in 1816.

Schoff's heavily annotated 1912 English translation was itself based on a defective original; as late as the 1960s, the only trustworthy scholarly edition was Frisk's 1927 French study.

== See also ==
- Agatharchides, author of On the Erythraean Sea
- Ancient Greece–Ancient India relations
- Indo-Roman relations
- Silk Road
