= Jawad Ali =

20th-century Iraqi Muslim historian

- جواد علي
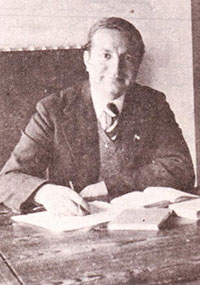
- Born: 1907; Kadhimiya, Baghdad Vilayet, Ottoman Iraq
- Died: 1987 (aged 80); Baghdad, Iraq
- Education: University of Hamburg
- Occupations: Historian, academic and writer
- Writing career
- Language: Arabic
- Period: 20th century CE
- Subject: History of Islam, History of the Arabs, Pre-Islamic Arabia
- Notable work: al-Mufassal fi Tarikh al-Arab Qabl al-Islam

Jawad Ali (1907–1987) was an Iraqi historian and academic who specialized in the history of both Islam and the Arabs. He is best known for his work al-Mufassal fi Tarikh al-Arab Qabl al-Islam (The comprehensive History of the Arabs before Islam), which is one of the most referenced works on pre-Islamic Arabia. Jawad Ali also had a doctorate from the University of Hamburg in 1939, and worked at the History department in the University of Baghdad starting from 1950.

== Biography ==
Jawad Ali was born in a town located in the Kadhimiya district of Baghdad, Iraq. After completing most of his studies in his homeland, he migrated to Germany where he would receive a doctorate from the University of Hamburg in 1939. After his return from Germany, he married an Iraqi woman and had three sons from this marriage, all of whom would become influential academics in future. With his family, he went on travels to Massachusetts and also the United Kingdom, where he also visited the institutes in those places as a visiting professor. In 1950, he was a professor at the History department of the University of Baghdad.

=== Death ===
In his older years, a terminal illness plagued him, and eventually he died from it at the age of 80 on the 26th of September in the year 1987.

== Works ==
Jawad Ali mainly specialized in Islamic history, as well as the history of the Arabs in general. The al-Mufassal fi Tarikh al-Arab Qabl al-Islam (The comprehensive History of the Arabs before Islam) is Jawad Ali's best known work regarding pre-Islamic history, and has been one of the most referenced works on the subject. In his later years, he also wrote a Seerah (prophetic biography) known as Tarikh al-Arab fi al-Islam, which, unlike his previous work on pre-Islamic Arabia, concerned the life of the Islamic prophet Muhammad and the Arabs after the rise of Islam, as well as being written in only one volume.
