= Wilfred Harvey Schoff =

American antiquarian and classical scholar (1874–1932)

Map showing commercial settlements described in the Periplus of the Erythraean Sea and the Periplus of Hanno.

Wilfred Harvey Schoff (1874–1932) was an early twentieth-century American antiquarian and classical scholar.

== Career ==
Schoff was responsible for translating a number of important ancient texts. Among these works was the 1st century CE Greco-Roman Periplus of the Erythraean Sea, as well as the Carthaginian Periplus of Hanno.

Besides writing, Schoff also served as Secretary of the Philadelphia Commercial Museum.

== Works ==
- Schoff, Wilfred H., The Periplus of Hanno: A Voyage of Discovery Down the West African Coast, by a Carthaginian Admiral of the Fifth Century B.C. (Philadelphia: Commercial Museum, 1912).
- Schoff, Wilfred H., The Periplus of the Erythraean Sea: Travel and Trade in the Indian Ocean, by a Merchant of the First century (New York City et al.: Longmans, Green, and Co., 1912)
- Schoff, Wilfred H., The descendants of Jacob Schoff who came to Boston in 1752 and settled in Ashburnham in 1757 : with an account of the German immigration into colonial New England (Philadelphia): [J. McGarrigle], 1910)
- Schoff, Wilfred H. The eastern iron trade of the Roman Empire. ([New Haven], 1915)
- Schoff, Wilfred H., The ship "Tyre"; a symbol of the fate of conquerors as prophesied by Isaiah, Ezekiel and John and fulfilled at Nineveh, Babylon and Rome; a study in the commerce of the Bible, (New York City Longmans, Green and co., 1920)
- Schoff, Wilfred H., Periplus of the Outer Sea, east and west, and of the great islands therein, by Marcian of Heraclea, Philadelphia, 1927.
