= Marthad'ilan Yanuf =

- King of Saba', Dhu Raydan, Hadramawt, Yamnat and their Arabs, on Tawdum and Tihamat
- Reign: 504–515 CE
- Predecessor: Marthad'ilan Yu'nim
- Successor: Ma'dikarib Ya'fur
- Born: Marthad ibn 'Abd-Kulal al-Himyari
- Died: c. 515; Yemen
- Issue: Wali'ah, Rabi'ah
Names
- Marthad ibn 'Abd-Kulal al-Himyari
Regnal name
- Marthad'ilan Yanuf
- Father: 'Abd-Kulal
- Religion: Christianity

Marthad'ilan Yanuf (Arabic: مرثد ألن ينوف), also romanized as Murthid 'Alan Yanuf, was a Himyarite king who reigned in the early 6th century CE. A devout Christian, Marthad'ilan Yanuf engaged in diplomatic relations with the Aksumite Empire as well as renovated churches in his territory. He is the first Christian ruler to have official rule over Himyar.

== Name ==
The name Marthad'ilan Yanuf appears in a few inscriptions dating to the early 6th century CE. In the books of Arab histories, his full name is given as Marthad ibn 'Abd-Kulal al-Himyari, which confirms that he is the son of the regent 'Abd-Kulal who is also a Christian, albeit a follower of Nontrinitarianism. He has a similar name to his predecessor, Marthad'ilan Yu'nim, although he is certainly not from the dynasty of Sharhabil Yakkuf.

== Reign ==
Marthad'ilan Yanuf was a diplomatic ruler with many construction projects. He welcomed three ambassadors from the Aksumite Empire into Yemen and supported a project to build a residence for them at Dhofar. He also financed the construction of a dam to help with the agriculture and farming. Marthad'ilan Yanuf reigned for fifteen years, afterwards he was succeeded by Ma'dikarib Ya'fur.

Marthad'ilan Yanuf was also known to have had interactions with soothsayers, especially with a priestess named Afina.

== Family ==
Marthad'ilan Yanuf's family is not attested to in the archaeological inscriptions preserved. The Arab historians identify him as being the son of 'Abd-Kulal. They also state that he had a son named Wali'ah who was a wise man who served in the government. Ibn Hisham in The Book of Crowns on the Kings of Himyar narrates that Marthad'ilan Yanuf had another son named Rabi'ah who took power although this is mostly a legendary tale as are most of the other stories in that book are based on legends in Arabian folklore.

== See also ==
- 'Abd-Kulal
- List of rulers of Saba' and Himyar
