= Abrahah Dhu'l-Manar =

Abrahah Dhu'l-Manar (Arabic: أبرهة ذو المنار, romanized: ʾAbraha Ḏū l-Manār) also known as Abrahah bin ar-Raish (Arabic: أبرهة بن الرائش), was an ancient Yemeni king. He is the son of Dhu'l-Qarnayn. He got his name because he feared that his troops would lose their way after they invaded the land of Maghrib to the extent that he built a lighthouse to guide his troops.
