= Dhamar Ali Yahbur II =

Dhamarʿalī Yuhabirr
- King of the Himyarite Kingdom
- Reign: 321–324 CE
- Successor: Tharan Yuhanim
- Died: c. 324; Yemen
- Religion: South Arabian polytheism

Dhamar ʿAlī Yuhabirr (or Dhamarʿalī Yuhabirr) (r. 321–324?) was a king of the Himyarite Kingdom (in modern-day Yemen). The definitive event during his reign was the submission of the Kingdom of Hadhramaut to his polity. Though he had a short reign, he was the founder of a new and remarkably stable dynasty of the Himyarite kingdom. By 500, only his and one other dynasty would rule. Significantly, with his reign, the hereditary transmission of successors became systematic and the king began to surround himself with a growing number of co-regents in order to facilitate the transference of power. At first Dhamar'ali reigned alone, but he later would reign alongside his son Tharan Yuhanim, who would succeed him. His name does not survive in the later Islamic tradition.

== Inscriptions ==
Dhamarali Yuhabirr is known from the following inscriptions:

- Ir 31
- Ir 32
- Schmidt-Maʾrib 28 + Ja 668
- Garb Sab. Fragm. 5
- Graf 5

== See also ==
- Ancient South Arabian art
- Sheba
