= Hassan Yuha'min =

- King of Saba', Dhu Raydan, Hadramawt, Yamnat and their Arabs, on Tawdum and Tihamat
- Reign: 420–450 CE
- Predecessor: Abu Karib
- Successor: Sharhabil Yafar
- Died: c. 450; Yemen
Names
- Hassan Yuha'min ibn Abi Karib As'ad ibn Hassan Malikikarib Yuha'min
- Father: Abu Karib
- Religion: Judaism

Hassan Yuha'min (Arabic: حسان يهأمن), full name Hassan Yuha'min ibn Abi Karib As'ad al-Himyari, was a Himyarite king who ruled in the 5th century CE. Originally, he ruled as part of a co-regency with his father, Abu Karib before ruling alongside his brother Sharhabil Ya'fur. Hassan Yuha'min has been featured in many Arabian legends, and is well-remembered for his rule.

== Reign ==
Around 400 CE, Hassan Yuha'min entered power as part of a co-regency with his father Abu Karib and his uncle Dhara' Amar Ayman. His uncle died in 410 CE, leaving him and his father left in power. Around 433 CE, Hassan Yuha'min was mentioned in an inscription dating to that period alongside four other kings, Abu Karib, Sharhabil Ya'fur, Ma'dikarib and Marthad. After the death of Abu Karib in 420 CE, Hassan Yuha'min became sole ruler alongside his brother, Sharhabil Ya'fur. However, his name later disappears from inscriptions after that period of time, and only the name of Sharhabil Ya'fur is present in these inscriptions which leads to a theory that Sharhabil had murdered his brother and taken the throne for himself. The historian Muhammad ibn Habib al-Baghdadi mentions that Hassan Yuha'min was one of the nobles of pre-Islamic Arabia who was assassinated.

== Personality ==
The Arab historians mainly had a favourable opinion of Hassan Yuha'min, describing him a courageous and a just leader. However, Abu al-Faraj al-Isfahani narrated that Hassan Yuha'min was very stubborn and immature, with an extremely oppressive rule which lead to his own assassination at the hands of his brother, Sharhabil Ya'fur.

== Military campaigns ==
During his time as co-regent, Hassan Yuha'min and his father both participated in conquests throughout South Arabia in order to control the trade routes; including the land of the tribe of the Ma'adite Arabs in the region of Najd. Hassan Yuha'min also annihilated a Bedouin tribe known as the Jadis during this period of co-regency; he did this after the king of an allied tribe was killed by members of the Jadis. The result of this campaign ended up in the massacre of the adults of the Jadis, while the children were enslaved and their village at Al-Yamama completely destroyed.

== In the Arab folklore ==
Ibn Hisham, Tabari and Abu al-Faraj al-Isfahani related that Hassan Yuha'min had led the tribes of Yemen in a massive conquest to expand Himyarite rule to other countries. When they had reached Iraq, the leaders of the tribes were displeased and tired, so they begged Hassan to allow them to return but he refused. Sick of Hassan's rule, they came to his brother 'Amr (Sharhabil Ya'fur) and offered to pledge allegiance to him as a king, if he killed his brother. 'Amr agreed to the deed despite the pleas from a noble elder named Dhu Ru'ayn to not do the deed. Contemporary historians suggest that this story, while mainly legendary, may have preserved a historical fact that Hassan was assassinated by his own brother.

== See also ==
- Sharhabil Ya'fur
- List of rulers of Saba and Himyar
