= Abu Karib =

Himyarite King of Yemen (390–420 CE)

Abu Karib As'ad al-Kamil
- King of Saba', Dhu Raydan, Hadramawt, Yamnat and their Arabs, on Tawdum and Tihamat

King of Himyarites
- Reign: 390–420 CE
- Predecessor: Malkikarib Yuhamin
- Successor: Hassan Yuha'min and Sharhabil Yafar
- Died: c. 430; Himyar (now Yemen)
Names
- Abu Karib As'ad ibn Hassan Malikikarib Yuha'min
Regnal name
- Tubba' As'ad
- Father: Malkikarib Yuhamin
- Religion: Judaism

Abū Karib As’ad al-Kāmil (Arabic: أسعد الكامل), called "Abū Karīb", sometimes rendered as As'ad Abū Karīb, full name: Abu Karib As'ad ibn Hassān Maliki Karib Yuha'min, was king (Tubba', Arabic: تُبَّع) of the Himyarite Kingdom (modern day Yemen). He ruled Yemen from 390 CE until 420 CE, beginning as a coregency with his father Malkikarib Yuhamin (r. 375–400) followed by becoming sole ruler in 400. As'ad is traditionally portrayed as the first of several kings of the Arabian Peninsula to convert to Judaism, although contemporary historians and pre-Islamic sources, such as Philostorgius have ascribed this transition to his father. He was traditionally regarded as the first one to cover the Kaaba with the kiswah.

== Biography ==
Abu Karib As'ad was the son of Malikikarib Yuha'min. He first came to power as part of a co-regency with both his father Malikikarib Yuha'min and his brother Dhara' Amar Ayman in 375 CE. After the death of Malikikarib Yuha'min in 385 CE, only Abu Karib and his brother Dhara' Amar Ayman were left to rule. Around the year 400 CE, Dhara' Amar Ayman either retired or died, leaving Abu Karib as the sole ruler in power. His date of death is unknown, but Christian Robin places it at 440 CE.

== Conversion to Judaism ==
While some sources agree that Abu Karib was the first of the Himyarite kings to convert to Judaism, the circumstances of his conversion are immersed in myth and legend. Historically, the Himyarite kings had accepted Judaism during the reign of Malikikarib Yuha'min around the year 384 CE. There is an inscription from that year which mentions the rejection of polytheism by Malikikarib Yuha'min, Abu Karib As'ad and Dhara' Amar Ayman, as well as another inscription which details Malikikarib Yuha'min and Abu Karib both authorizing the construction of a mikrab (Jewish prayer house) in Ma'rib.

=== The legend of Abu Karib's conversion to Judaism ===
According to the traditional account, Abu Karib undertook a military expedition to eliminate the growing influence of Byzantium in his northern provinces. His forces reached Medina, which was then known as "Yathrib". Not meeting any resistance, the Himyarites passed through the town, leaving one of the king's sons behind as governor of the town. A few days later, however, the people of Yathrib killed their new governor, the king's son. Upon receiving the news, the king turned his troops back to avenge his son's death, and destroy the town. He ordered that all palm trees around the town be cut down, because the trees were the main source of the town's inhabitants' income, and then laid siege to the town.

The Jews of Yathrib fought alongside their pagan Arab neighbors, trying to protect their town. During the siege, Abu Karib fell ill. Two local Rabbis, named Kaab and Assad, took the opportunity to travel to his camp, and persuaded him to lift the siege. The scholars also inspired in the King an interest in Judaism, and he converted in 390 CE, persuading his army to do likewise. Kaab and Assad later returned with Abu Karib to his kingdom, where they were tasked with converting the population. However, while some scholars say the population converted on a wholesale basis, others opine that only about half became converts, the rest maintaining their pagan beliefs and temples. Among those who converted to Judaism was Harith ibn 'Amr, a nephew of Abu Karib, who was then appointed as the Viceroy of the people of Ma'ad on the Red Sea, and headed the government of Mecca and Yathrib.

=== Opposition to the claim of Abu Karib's conversion ===
One dissenter from the view that Abu Karib Asad was a convert to Judaism is author J. R. Porter. Writing in the 1980s, Porter argued that the legendary accounts of Abu Karib's conversion first appear much later in the historical record and are therefore unreliable. Porter nonetheless acknowledged that a move toward Judaism on Abu Karib's part would be "entirely credible", given the presence of powerful Jewish tribes in Yathrib. Porter states that a later Himyarite ruler, Dhu Nuwas (517–530 CE) was "certainly" a convert to Judaism.

== Family ==
Abu Karib As'ad was the son of Malikikarib Yuha'min, and the brother of Dhara' Amar Ayman. His full lineage is given as Abu Karib As'ad ibn Hassan Malikikarib Yuha'min ibn Tharan Yuha'nim ibn Dhamar Ali Yuhabirr. Arabian folklore also cites Abu Karib as having a nephew named Harith ibn 'Amr.

Abu Karib As'ad had five sons. Their names are attested to in the inscriptions as Hassan Yuha'min, Ma'dikarib, Marthad and Sharhabil Yafar. The historian Ibn al-Kalbi gives a similar list, except the names of Marthad and Sharhabil Yafar are replaced with the names Juhaal and 'Amr Mawthaban instead. Ibn Kathir claims that Abu Karib had two daughters as well, whose graves were found in the center of a city that was under construction during the time of the Rashidun Caliphate.

Some scholars held the view that Dhu Nuwas was the son of Abu Karib. Those who held the view include Wahb ibn Munabbih, Ibn Ishaq, Ibn Hisham and Ibn Kathir. However, Ibn al-Kalbi holds the view that Dhu Nuwas was the son of Hassan Yuha'min and hence the grandson of Abu Karib. Other scholars like Ibn al-Athir held the view that Dhu Nuwas was the son of an unspecified Sharhabil, theorised to have been Sharhabil Yakkuf.

== Muslim-era sources ==
While Abu Karib As'ad is not mentioned in Muslim sources, exegesis scholar Ibn Kathir provides Islamic traditions regarding Abu Karib Asad. He is described as being the mysterious Tubba' who is mentioned in the Surah Ad-Dukhan of the Qur'an.

Ibn Kathir mentions that the Tubba' Abu Karib was formerly a polytheist king of Saba' and Himyar who intended to attack Medina, but was told off by two Jewish rabbis who warned him that Medina would be the final place of migration for an upcoming Prophet. The Tubba' went to Makkah and almost proceeded to destroy the Kaaba, but he was warned against doing so as well. He then felt an interest in Judaism and converted to the religion of Moses, which was described as the religion that which the rightly guided followed before the coming of Jesus. He brought the Rabbis back with him to Yemen, where they converted the population to Judaism, but after the death of the Tubba' the people went astray and so God sent down his wrath on them.

Mustafa Khattab in his translation of the Quran attributes Abu Karib as being Dhu al-Qarnayn.

== See also ==
- People of Tubba'
- List of rulers of Saba and Himyar
