= Sharhabil Yakkuf =

- King of Saba', Dhu Raydan, Hadramawt, Yamnat and their Arabs, on Tawdum and Tihamat
- Reign: 465–480 CE
- Predecessor: Sharhabil Yafar
- Successor: Lakhni'ah Yanuf
- Died: c. 480; Yemen
- Issue: Lakhni'ah Yanuf, Ma'dikarib Ya'fur and Abu Shamir Nawaf
Names
- Sharhabil Yakkuf al-Himyari
- Father: Disputed: Nawf Yushashqir (according to Al-Hamdani); Hassan Yuha'min (according to Al-Tabari)
- Religion: Judaism

Sharhabil Yakkuf (Arabic: شرحبيل يكف) also known as Šaraḥbiʾil Yakûf (Ge'ez: Sarābhēl Dänkəf) was a king of Himyar who reigned in the 5th century CE. He succeeded the similarly named Sharhabil Yafur. He is also the founder of a new ruling dynasty, one that is not descended from Dhamar Ali Yahbur II.

Sharhabil Yakkuf is also known in Arabian folklore as Tubba' bin Hassan or Sharhabil Yankuf ibn Nawf Yushashqir.

== Reign ==
His exact date of ascension is not known, the oldest inscription mentioning him is dated to 470 CE. Two years later, in 472 CE, Sharhabil Yakkuf shared the royal title King of Saba', Dhu Raydan, Hadramawt, Yamnat and their Arabs, on Tawdum and Tihamat with his three sons, Lakhni'ah Yanuf, Ma'dikarib Yun'im, and Abu Shamir Nawaf. The last inscription mentioning his name is dated to circa 480 CE, which means his reign might've ended around that time. Due to his name in inscriptions lacking a patronymic, he is believed by historians to be completely unrelated to the descendants of Dhamar Ali Yahbur II, hence he was the founder of a new dynasty to rule over Himyar.

=== Diplomacy ===
Sharhabil Yakkuf appointed his nephew Harith ibn 'Amr to rule over the land of the tribe of Ma'ad. During his expeditions across the peninsula, he built a chain of synagogues across the trade routes from South to East Arabia which were not only meant for the purpose of worship, but for the Himyarite kings to transmit messages back to their palace; similar to a post office.

== Military campaigns ==
In the year 474 CE, Sharhabil Yakkuf and his three sons carried out a major campaign to the north of the Arabian Peninsula, in order to stop the attacks from rebellious Arab tribes which included branches of the Tayy and Abd al-Qays. Sharhabil Yakkuf also confronted the Lakhmid ruler, Amr ibn al-Aswad, and fought against his kingdom, resulting in the death of more than three hundred Lakhmid troops. Four hundred camels were also seized from the Abd al-Qays tribe as loot.

== Persecution of Christians ==
According to several Ethiopian sources, especially the Martyrdom of Azqir, a missionary named Azqir arrived in Najran during the rule of Sharhabil Yakkuf to spread the message and religion of Christianity. He earned the hostility of some of the people, and was subsequently arrested by the local authorities. Then, King Sharhabil was told that Azqir had been preaching a "new religion." Azqir was put on trial at court, where the king was not impressed by his preaching. Under the advice of some Rabbis who were present in the court, Azqir was executed. Some reports state that at least 38 other people of the Christian faith including monks and priests were executed as well. The incident is dated to between the years 470 to 475 CE.

The motive for Azqir's execution is still disputed, with some theorizing that it was not for religious reasons but to prevent Byzantine influence into Himyarite territory, as Christianity was seen as something associated with the Byzantines.

== In Arabian folklore ==
Sharhabil Yakkuf is known as Tubba' bin Hassan in the Arabian folklore. This account deviates from reality by claiming that Sharhabil is the son of Hassan Yuha'min, when in reality he was the founder of a new dynasty that may have been unrelated to the family of Abu Karib. Additionally, Tubba' bin Hassan is said to have executed a group of Jews, however Sharhabil Yakkuf himself adhered to Judaism (although these Jews he had killed could have been the ones who converted to Christianity).

A different tradition, however, identifies Sharhabil Yakkuf as being named Sharhabil Yankuf ibn Nawf Yushashqir.

== See also ==
- List of rulers of Saba and Himyar
