= Ibn Battal =

Andalusian Islamic scholar (died 1057)

Imam Ibn Baṭṭāl
- ابن بطال
- Title: Al-Ḥāfiẓ

Personal life
- Died: 1057 (449 AH) Valencia
- Era: Islamic golden age
- Region: Iberian Peninsula
- Notable work: Sharh Ibn Battal
- Occupation: Scholar, Jurist, Traditionist, Judge

Religious life
- Religion: Islam
- Denomination: Sunni
- Jurisprudence: Maliki
- Creed: Ash'ari

Muslim leader
- Influenced by: Malik ibn Anas Baqi ibn Makhlad Abu Hasan al-Ash'ari Ibn al-Faradi

Abū al-Ḥasan ʿAlī ibn Khalaf ibn ʿAbd al-Malik ibn Baṭṭāl al-Bakrī al-Qurṭubī al-Mālikī (Arabic: أبو الحسن علي بن خلف بن عبد الملك بن بطال البكري القرطبي المالكي), better known as Ibn Baṭṭāl (Arabic: اابن بطال) was an Andalusian Islamic scholar primarily known for his expertise in Hadith and Islamic jurisprudence. His celebrated Sharh Ibn Battal is a classic commentary of Sahih al-Bukhari, the first of the Six Books of Sunni Islam.

== Life ==
There are no historical documents that the biographers have cited that provide specifics on his birthdate, upbringing, or pursuit of knowledge. They did, however, all acknowledge his enormous efforts to study and become an expert in jurisprudence, Hadith, interpretation, belief, language, origins, and other subjects.

The biographers did manage to record the teachers he studied under. However, it is noted he studied a large number of ulama and among he most prominent: Abu Umar al-Talamanki, Ibn Afif, Ibn al-Faradi, Abu al-Qasim al-Wahrani, Abu Abd al-Warith, and Abu Bakr al-Razi.

Ibn Battal was a highly sought after Hadith expert and people from all over al-Andalus would flock to him. He served as a judge in the fort of Lorca. He was a teacher who produced numerous students. Among his most popular students: Muhammad bin Yahya bin Muhammad al-Zahtaa al-Taimi al-Andalusi, Al-Saqqat al-Funki, Abu Dawood, Abu al-Abbas, and Abdurrahman ibn Bishr.

Wednesday night, while being prayed for during the noon prayer in Valencia, Ibn Battal died (449 A.H. - 1057 A.D). Rather Ibn Bashkuwal claimed to have seen in Abu al-Hasan al-Maqri's handwriting that he died on Wednesday night, that his funeral prayer was said at noon in 449 A.H., and that al-Andalus was greatly affected by his passing.

== Reception ==
Syrian Islamic scholar al-Dhahabi (d. 1348) said he was one of the senior Malikis (of his time) and Qadi Iyad (d. 1149) said he was a noble, exalted, and morphologist man.

Ibn Bashkuwal states: “He was one of the seekers of knowledge, understanding, good handwriting, and well-tuned. He meticulously cares about the Hadith perfecting what was restricted from it and explained Sahih al-Bukhari in several volumes, and people narrated it from him. He used to imitate speech in the manner of al-Ash'ari, and he died in the year four hundred and forty-nine.”

== Works ==
Ibn Battal authored many books on Hadith and jurisprudence. His most popular work is his celebrated commentary on Sahih al-Bukhari ranging 11 volumes entitled Sharh Ibn Battal. It is widely acclaimed in the Sunni community and considered one of the earliest commentaries of Sahih al-Bukhari.

== See also ==
- List of Ash'aris
