= Qadi Abd al-Wahhab =

11th-century Islamic jurist of Later Abbasid era

Imam Qāḍī ʿAbd al-Wahhāb
- القاضي عبد الوهاب
- Title: Al-Qāḍī

Personal life
- Born: 973 Baghdad
- Died: 1031 (aged 57–58) Cairo
- Era: Later Abbasid era
- Region: Iraq and Egypt
- Main interest(s): Islamic jurisprudence, Principles of Islamic jurisprudence
- Notable work: Al-Talqin
- Occupation: Scholar, Judge, Jurist, Legal theoretician, Theologian

Religious life
- Religion: Islam
- Denomination: Sunni
- Jurisprudence: Maliki
- Creed: Ash'ari

Muslim leader
- Influenced by: Malik ibn Anas Sahnun Abu al-Hasan al-Ash'ari Al-Baqillani

Qāḍī ʿAbd al-Wahhāb ibn ʿAlī ibn Naṣr ibn Aḥmad ibn al-Ḥusayn ibn Hārūn ibn Malik ibn Tawk al-Taghlibī (Arabic: القاضي عبد الوهاب بن علي بن نصر بن أحمد بن الحسين بن هارون بن مالك بن طوق التغلبي); commonly known as Qāḍī ʿAbd al-Wahhāb (Arabic: القاضي عبد الوهاب; 422–362 AH/ 973–1035 CE) was an Iraqi Sunni scholar. He was considered the leading Maliki jurist of his age. He was a seminal figure of the now extinct Iraqi faction of the Maliki school.

Qadi 'Abd al-Wahhab is also remembered for his knowledge of Arabic literature and poetry. He is known by the title Qadi meaning judge in Arabic, as he was a prominent judge in Abbasid Siirt and Badra. He is best known for his work al-Talqin on Maliki fiqh which is still studied today, particularly for its recording of the positions of the Iraqi school of the Maliki madhab.

== Life ==
He was born in Baghdad on 7 Shawwāl 362 AH (11 July 973 CE). He belonged to a distinguished family descended from the ʿAbbāsid emir Malik ibn Tawk (d. 260/874), the founder of the city of al-Rahba between Baghdad and Raqqa. He studied under leading Mālikī scholars in Baghdad such as Abū Bakr al-Abharī, Abū Bakr al-Bāqillānī, Ibn al-Jallāb, Ibn al-Qaṣṣār, Ḥusayn b. Muḥammad al-Daqqāq al-ʿAskarī, Ibn Shādhān al-Baghdādī, and Abū Ḥafṣ Ibn Shāhīn. It was under al-Bāqillānī, he studied Maliki jurisprudence, legal theory, and Ash'ari theology.

Qāḍī ʿAbd al-Wahhāb distinguished himself not merely in a single field of knowledge, but especially in fiqh, legal theory (uṣūl al-fiqh), and the science of legal disagreement (ʿilm al-khilāf). In addition, he was also occupied with tafsīr, hadith, kalām, and literature. After completing his education, he served as judge (Qāḍī) in the Iraqi towns of Bādarāyā and Bākūsāyā, as well as in Siirt (Isʿird) and Dīnawar. Toward the end of his life, due to financial hardship, he migrated to Cairo, where one of his brothers was engaged in trade. It is also said that he left Baghdad because he feared retaliation from followers of the Shāfiʿī school after making a statement against Imām al-Shāfiʿī. Ibn ʿAsākir records that while traveling to Egypt, Qāḍī ʿAbd al-Wahhāb stopped in Damascus in Shawwāl 419 AH (November 1028 CE). During this same journey, he stayed in Maʿarrat al-Nuʿmān as a guest of the poet Abū al-ʿAlāʾ al-Maʿarrī, who composed verses praising both his juristic mastery and poetic talent.

In Cairo, where he served as a Mālikī judge, ʿAbd al-Wahhāb intended to travel onward to the Maghreb and al-Andalus, and he met with regional scholars and friends from whom he received invitations, but the journey never materialized. While in Mecca for the pilgrimage (Hajj), he heard from pilgrims that al-Mustanṣir bi’llāh was persecuting adherents of the Mālikī school in Egypt. He wrote to him inquiring about the matter, and received a reply denying the truth of those rumors.

Qāḍī ʿAbd al-Wahhāb devoted himself to teaching and training students throughout his appointments as judge in both Iraq and Egypt, producing many notable pupils. Among them were Ibn ʿAmrūs al-Baghdādī, ʿAbd al-Ḥaqq b. Hārūn al-Ṣiqillī, Abū al-Faḍl Muslim b. ʿAlī al-Dimashqī, known as “Ghulām ʿAbd al-Wahhāb” because of his closeness and devotion to his teacher, Ibn al-Shammāḥ al-Ghāfiqī, al-Khaṭīb al-Baghdādī, and Abū Isḥāq al-Shīrāzī.

He died in Cairo in Shaʿbān 422 AH (August 1031 CE), allegedly of food poisoning. He was buried in the Qarafa cemetery in Cairo between the tomb of Imam al-Shafi and the gates of Qarafa. His tomb is near that of Ibn al-Qasim al-Utaqi and Ashhab ibn Abd al-Aziz, two notable direct students of Imam Malik.

== Legacy ==
Qāḍī ʿAbd al-Wahhāb al-Baghdādī was one of the leading mujtahid imams and foremost Mālikī jurists of his age, who made immense contributions to the development of both substantive law (furūʿ) and legal theory (uṣūl) through his works and opinions. Writing according to the methodology of the mutakallimūn, he played a pivotal role in harmonizing Mālikī jurisprudence with its legal-theoretical foundations, thereby becoming one of the key figures in the intellectual formation and systematization of the Mālikī school during the fifth Islamic century.

Al-Khaṭīb al-Baghdādī stated that he had never encountered a Mālikī scholar more learned in jurisprudence than him, while al-Bāqillānī said that if his two students Abū ʿImrān al-Fāsī and ʿAbd al-Wahhāb were brought together, the entirety of Imām Mālik's knowledge would be assembled. His narrations and legal opinions held great authority within the school and were widely cited not only in his own writings but throughout Mālikī literature, especially in al-Qarāfī's al-Dhakhīra. Having inherited Mālikī doctrine from jurists and legal theorists such as Abū Bakr al-Bāqillānī and Ibn al-Qaṣṣār, Qāḍī ʿAbd al-Wahhāb became the vital link transmitting it to later scholars like Ibn Rushd, al-Bājī, and Shihāb al-Dīn al-Qarāfī.

== Works ==
His list of works include:

1. Al-Maʿūna ʿalā Madhhabi ʿĀlim al-Madīna – A concise introductory work to his earlier two-volume books al-Mumahhid and Sharḥ Risālat. Besides legal proofs, it also cites the opinions of other schools and became a source for many Mālikī legal works.
2. Al-Talqīn fī al-Fiqh al-Mālikī – One of the foundational concise texts of the Mālikī school, edited as a doctoral dissertation by Muḥammad Sālis Saʿīd al-Ghānī at Umm al-Qurā University in Mecca (1416/1995). Besides the author’s unfinished commentary, commentaries were also written by Ibn Bazīza (Rawḍat al-Mustabīn fī Sharḥ al-Talqīn) and Muḥammad b. ʿAlī al-Māzarī (Sharḥ al-Talqīn).
3. Al-Muqaddima fī al-Uṣūl – A short treatise serving as an introduction to al-Talqīn, discussing the acts of morally responsible persons. It was published alongside Ibn al-Qaṣṣār's al-Muqaddima fī al-Uṣūl and other legal theory treatises in Beirut (1996).
4. ʿUyūn al-Majālis – An abridgment of Ibn al-Qaṣṣār's work on legal disagreement, ʿUyūn al-Adilla, published by Ambay b. Kaybākāh (5 vols., Riyadh, 1421/2000).
5. Al-Ishrāf ʿalā Nukat Masāʾil al-Khilāf (2 vols.) – Published in Tunis and later edited by al-Jayyib b. Ṭāhir in Beirut (1420/1999). Its hadiths were traced and documented by Badawī ʿAbd al-Ṣamad in al-Ithāf.
6. Al-Mumahhid fī Sharḥ Mukhtaṣar Abī Muḥammad Ibn Abī Zayd – A commentary on half of Ibn Abī Zayd's Mukhtaṣar al-Mudawwana. A manuscript of volume five survives at Umm al-Qurā University in Mecca.
7. Sharḥ Risālat Ibn Abī Zayd – A commentary on Ibn Abī Zayd's famous al-Risāla, one of the core texts of the Mālikī school. The section on creed has been published separately by Badr al-ʿAmrānī al-Ṭanjī and Aḥmad Muḥammad Nūr Sayf.
8. Al-Naẓāʾir fī al-Fiqh
9. Sharḥ Fuṣūl al-Aḥkām wa Bayān Mā Maḍā Bihi al-ʿAmal ʿinda al-Fuqahāʾ wa al-Ḥukkām – Brockelmann’s listed title Ghurar al-Muḥāḍara wa Ruʾūs Masāʾil al-Munāẓara is not a separate work but rather a phrase from the introduction describing this book’s contents.
10. Al-Nuṣra li-Madhhab Imām Dār al-Hijra – Reportedly consisted of one hundred fascicles and was allegedly purchased and destroyed in Cairo by a Shāfiʿī chief judge.
11. Al-Ifāda – Mentioned by al-Qarāfī at the beginning of al-Dhakhīra as the first of four works summarizing principles of legal theory.

== See also ==
- List of Ash'aris
