= Ibn Rushd al-Jadd =

Muslim jurist (1058–1126)

Abu ʾl-Walīd Muḥammad ibn Aḥmad ibn Aḥmad ibn Rushd (Note: In this Arabic name, Abu ʾl-Walīd is the kunya, Muḥammad is the ism or given name, while ibn Aḥmad ibn Aḥmad ibn Rushd is a nasab or series of patronymics. There is no nisba (tribal name). He was sometimes known to contemporaries as Abu ʾl-Walīd Qurṭubī ("the Córdoban").) (December 1058 – 8 December 1126), (Note: In the Islamic calendar, his month of birth is Shawwāl 450 AH and his date of death is 21 Dhu ʾl-Qaʿda 520.) nicknamed al-Jadd ("the grandfather"), was a Muslim jurist of the Mālikī school. He was the most prominent Mālikī jurist of his time in al-Andalus (Spain) and the Maghrib (northwest Africa), but his fame today rests on being the grandfather of the philosopher of the same name, Ibn Rushd (Averroes), nicknamed al-Ḥafīd ("the grandson").

== Life ==
The main sources of Ibn Rushd's life are his biographical entry in the catalogue of teachers, al-Ghunya, of his pupil, al-Qāḍī ʿIyāḍ. The Kitāb al-ṣila of Ibn Bashkuwāl is another primary source. Most later biographies of Ibn Rushd al-Jadd depend on these. The 14th-century al-Marqaba al-ʿulyā of al-Bunnāhī, a history of Andalusian qāḍīs, also transmits some information from the biography of Ibn Rushd's pupil Ibn al-Wazzān and the anonymous 13th-century Andalusian history al-Ḥulal al-mawshiyya.

Ibn Rushd was a native of the city of Córdoba. From 1117 until his resignation in 1121, he held the highest judicial office in the Almoravid Emirate, that of qāḍī ʾl-jamāʿa in Córdoba.

On 10 March 1126, King Alfonso of Aragon was defeated in the battle of Arniswāl. During his campaign, he had received support from the Mozarabs, Christians living under Almoravid rule. On 30 March, Ibn Rushd went to Marrakesh to provide advice to the Emir ʿAlī ibn Yūsuf. He advised that the Mozarabs had forfeited their dhimmī status by treason and urged ʿAlī to deport them to Morocco. As a result, many were relocated to Salé and Meknès. He also advised ʿAlī to fortify the cities of al-Andalus with walls, to wall off Marrakesh and to replace Abū Ṭāhir Tamīm, ʿAlī's brother, as governor of al-Andalus.

Ibn Rushd returned to Córdoba in July 1126 and died there five months later. He was buried in the cemetery of Ibn ʿAbbās in the eastern quarter.

== Writings ==
Ibn Rushd was primarily a systematizer of uṣūl al-fiqh (science of law), building on the basis of the generation of scholars who preceded him. The titles of seventeen works by Ibn Rushd are known, sixteen of them on Islamic law and one on the ʿaqīda (creed). Three of his works stand out: the Muqaddimāt, (Note: Full title: Kitāb al-Muqaddimāt al-mumahhadāt li-bayān mā ʾqtaḍathu rusūm al-Mudawwana.) a commentary on the Mudawwana of Saḥnūn ibn Saʿīd; the al-Bayān wa ʾl-taḥṣīl, (Note: Full title: Kitāb al-Bayān wa ʾl-taḥṣīl li-mā fī ʾl-Mustakhraja.) a commentary on the Mustakhraja (ʿUtbiyya) of al-ʿUtbī; and the Fatāwā, (Note: Actual title: Nawāzil Ibn Rushd.) a collection of his fatwās (rulings), published by his pupil, Ibn al-Wazzān. The last is the earliest such collection from al-Andalus.
