= Abu Ishaq =

Abu Ishaq (literally "father of Isaac") may refer to:

- Abu Ishaq Muhammad al-Mutasim (796-842), Abbasid caliph (r. 833–842) and one of the most famous bearer of this Teknonym.
- Abu Ishaq Ahmad al-Tha'labi (died 1035/36), Persian scholar
- Abu Ishaq al-Fazari (died 805), Islamic historian, traditionalist and jurist
- Abu Ishaq Ibrahim al-Muttaqi (908-968), Caliph of Baghdad from 940 to 944
- Abu Ishaq al-Houweny (1956-2025), Egyptian Shafi'i scholar
- Abū Isḥāq al-Ilbirī, 11th-century Andalusian poet and faqīh
- Abu Ishaq al-Isfarayini (948/949-1027/28), medieval Sunni Islamic theologian
- Abu Ishaq al-Saffar al-Bukhari (1067–1139), Sunni theologian and Sufi
- Abu Ishaq al-Shatibi (1320–1388), Andalusian Maliki scholar
- Abu Ishaq al-Shirazi (1003–1083), Shafi'i-Ash'ari scholar
- Abu Ishaq al-Zouaoui (1394–1453), Algerian Maliki scholar
- Abu Ishaq Ibrahim (953–after 978), Buyid prince
- Abu Ishaq Ibrahim I (1279–1283), Hafsid emir of Ifriqiya
- Abu Ishaq Ibrahim al-Istakhri (died after 952), Persian geographer
- Abu Ishaq Ibrahim al-Sahili (1290–1346), Andalusian poet and legal scholar
- Abū Isḥāq Ibrāhīm al-Zarqālī (1029–1087), Andalusian Muslim instrument maker
- Abu Ishaq Ibrahim of Ghazna (died 966), Turkic officer, who was the Samanid governor of Ghazna
- Abu Ishaq Ibrahim ibn al-Sari al-Zajjaj (842–922), Iraqi grammarian
- Abu Ishaq Ibrahim ibn al-Mudabbir (died 893), Abbasid courtier
- Abu Ishaq Ibrahim ibn Khafaja (1058–1138), Andalusian poet
- Abu Ishaq Inju (died 1358), last Injuid ruler
- Abu Ishaq Shami (died 940), Syrian Sufi and scholar

== See also ==
- Boushaki (disambiguation)
