= Abd al-Rahman ibn al-Qasim al-Utaqi =

8th-century Egyptian Muslim jurist

'Abd al-Rahman ibn al-Qasim al-'Utaqi
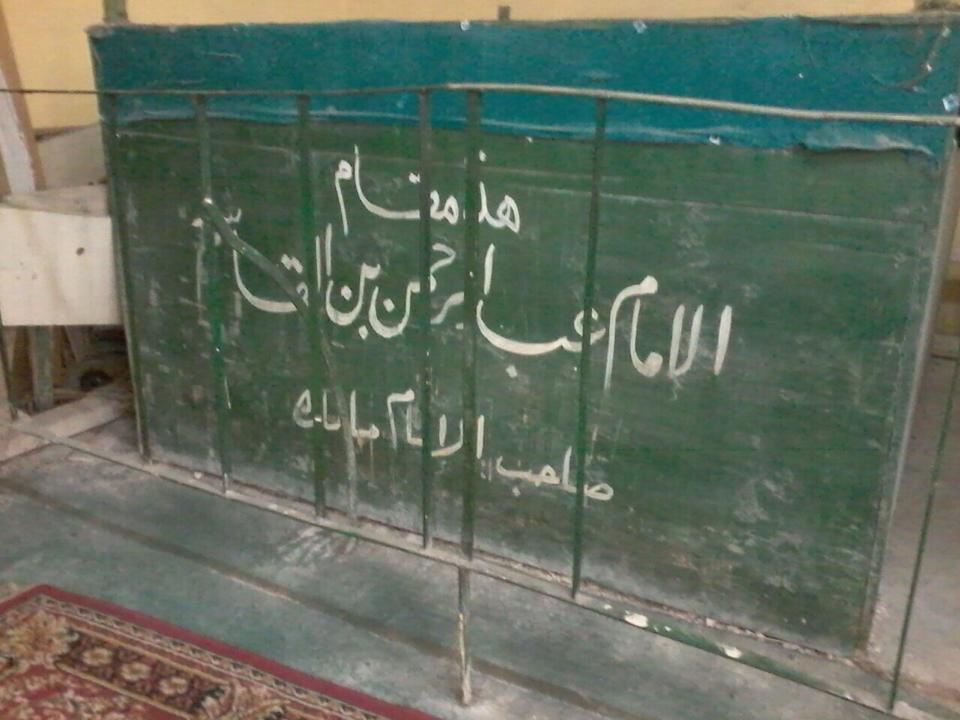
- The tomb of Ibn al-Qasim in the Qarafa cemetery in Cairo.
- Title: Ibn al-Qasim

Personal life
- Born: 750 CE (132 AH); Egypt
- Died: 806 CE (191 AH); Egypt
- Era: Abbasid Caliphate
- Region: Medina and Egypt
- Main interest(s): Fiqh
- Notable work(s): Main oral transmitter of Sahnun's Mudawwana

Religious life
- Religion: Islam
- Jurisprudence: Maliki

ʿAbd al-Rahmān ibn al-Qāsim al-Utaqi (Arabic: عَبْدُ الرَّحْمَنِ بْنُ الْقَاسِمِ الْعُتَقِيُّ; c. 750–806) was a prominent early jurist in the Maliki school from Egypt. He was one of Malik's main companions and had a tremendous influence in recording the positions of the school. Ibn al-Qasim was the source for Sahnun in his Mudawwana, a record of Malik's teachings. He has the same position in the Maliki school as Muhammad al-Shaybani has in the Hanafi school, in so far as both of them transmitted their respective schools and made free use of ijtihad (independent reasoning). Ibn al-Qasim had opinions which differed from those of Malik, to the point that it was said that he was dominated by opinion.

== Life ==
Abd al-Rahman ibn al-Qasim was born in Egypt in a mosque known as the 'Utaqi Mosque in the mid 8th century CE at a time when the Abbasids took control of the Muslim world from the Umayyads. Ibn al-Qasim's origins were from the Palestinian town of Ramla. He was a descendant from the slaves of Ta'if whom the Prophet Muhammad had freed. Ibn al-Qasim's father was in the Dewan, and he used the money he inherited from him for his studies.

He travelled from Egypt to Medina after what is recorded as a visionary dream and after having been drawn to gatherings of religious knowledge in Egypt. In Medina, he met Malik as well as Ibn Wahb, another of Malik's famous companions. Ibn al-Qasim kept the company of Malik for the relatively long period of about twenty years. It was from him that he learned his fiqh (jurisprudence). In Medina he also met Al-Layth, Ibn al-Majishun and Muslim ibn Khalid al-Zanji. Many people related from him and consulted him about Malik's fatwas. Ibn Wahb used to say, "If you want this business – meaning the fiqh of Malik – you must have Ibn al-Qasim. He is unique in it". His transmission of the Muwatta is considered to be the soundest transmission, and Sahnun learned the contents of the Mudawwana, the most comprehensive collection of Maliki fiqh, from him. Thus he can be considered as the main transmitter of Maliki fiqh, for the Mudawwana is its chief source.

Ibn al-Qasim was generally known for his vast knowledge. When Malik was asked about him and Ibn Wahb, he replied that Ibn Wahb was a knowledgeable man whilst Ibn al-Qasim was a true faqih (jurist). He was also known as having ascetic qualities and spent much of his time reciting the Quran such that he would finish many readings in a short space of time. On his return to Egypt he refused to marry the daughters of wealthy officials and generally kept clear of the ruling class. He died in Egypt at the age of 63 in the month of Safar, 191 AH (806 CE) three days after returning from a trip to Mecca. Ibn al-Qasim left behind him two sons Abd ar-Rahman and 'Umar.
