= Abu al-Hassan al-Lakhmi =

11th-century Islamic jurist

Abu al Hassan Ali ibn Muhammad Al-Qayrawani Al-Lakhmi
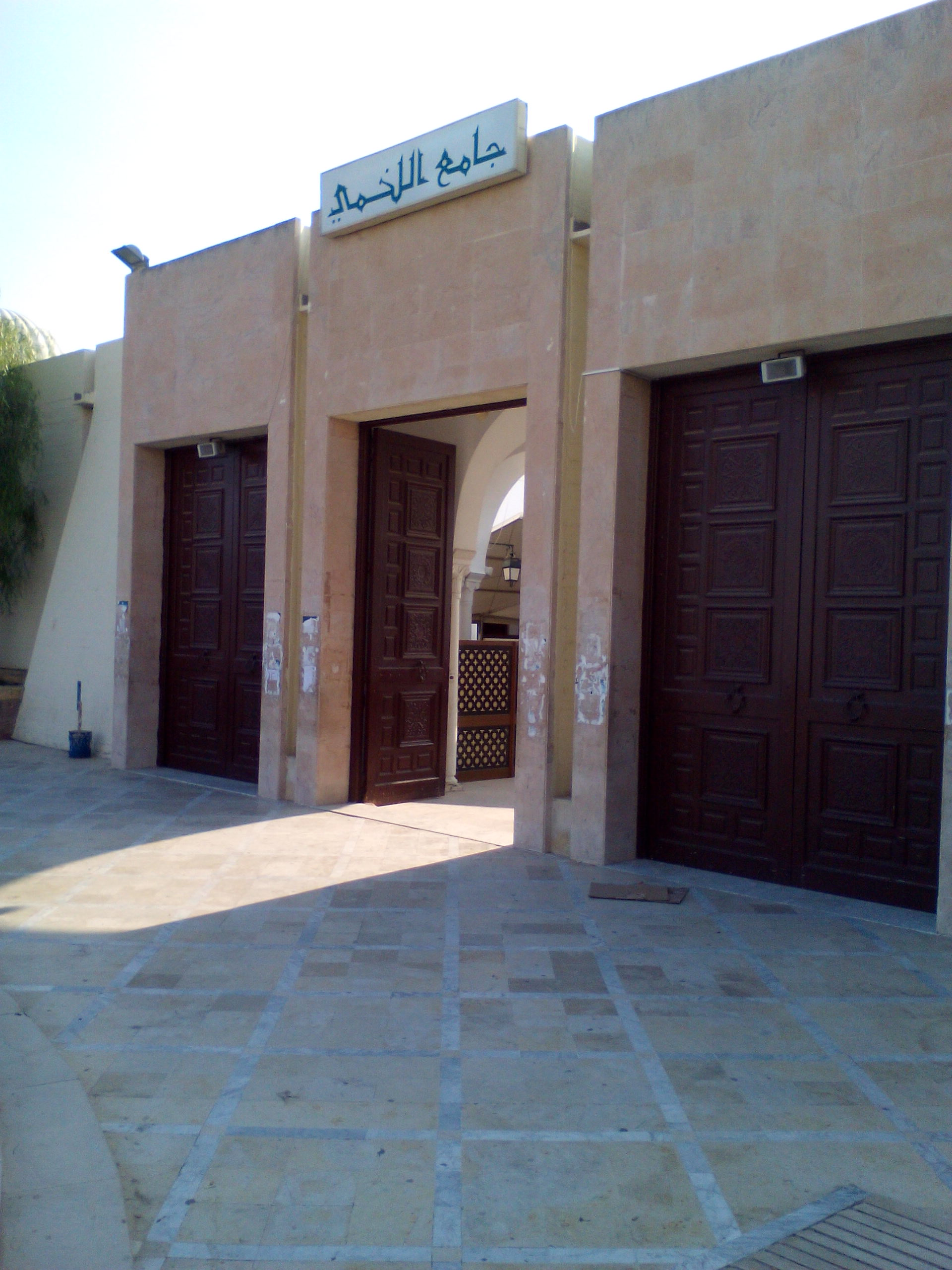
- Entrance to the mosque and tomb complex of Imam Al-Lakhmi in Sfax, Tunisia.
- Title: AL Lakhmi

Personal life
- Born: 1006 CE (390 AH); Kairouan, Zirid Dynasty
- Died: 1085 CE (478 AH); Sfax, Zirid Dynasty
- Era: Fatimid Caliphate
- Region: Ifriqiya (modern day Tunisia)
- Main interest: Fiqh
- Notable work: at-Tabsira

Religious life
- Religion: Islam
- Jurisprudence: Maliki
- Creed: Sunni

Muslim leader
- Influenced: Al-Maziri

Abu al-Hassan Ali ibn Muhammad Al-Qayrawani Al-Rab'i Al-Lakhmi (Arabic: أبو الحسن علي بن محمد القيرواني الربعي اللخمي), also known as Imam al-Lakhmi (c. 1006 – 1085 CE) (390 AH – 478 AH ), was a famous jurist in the Maliki school of Sunni Islamic Law. His nisba indicates that he is from the Arab tribes of Banu Lakhm. He was one of the most important figures in the school and his opinions are still well known and respected to this day. Al-Lakhmi was one of four jurists whose positions were held as authoritative by Khalil ibn Ishaq in his Mukhtassar (one of the most important of the later texts in the relied upon positions of the school).

== Biography ==
Al-Lakhmi was born in Qayrawan and spent the early part of his life there before moving to Sfax. Here he continued his education and then began teaching students in the mosque of the city. One of his students was al-Mazari (d. 536/1141), who refers to al-Lakhmi more frequently than any other teacher in his own works. Al-Lakhmi died in Sfax in 478/1085.

== Known works ==
Al-Lakhmi's juristic compendium al-Tabsirah is an important text in the Maliki legal school. It is a commentary on one of the Maliki school's most famous works, al-Mudawwana, by Sahnun b. Sa'id (d. 240/854).

This book is a reference that takes up the great books that preceded it as al-Wadiha of Ibn Habib and which will then be taken up by the Malikite scholars later as Ibn Rushd or al-Khalil in his Mukhtasar.

In the book he discusses many questions in detail and develops opinions, relating these to teachings of other Maliki scholars.
