= Abd Allah ibn Wahb =

Abd Allah ibn Wahb may refer to:

- Abd Allah ibn Wahb al-Rasibi (died 658), early Kharijite leader
- Ibn Wahb (743–813), Maliki jurist
