= Zurqani =

Al-Zurqani, al-Dhurqani or just Zurqani is an Arabic nisba. It is usually added at the end of names as a specifier. The list includes:

- Abu-Abd-Allah Muhammad al-Zurqani (1645–1710)
- Abd-al-Baqi al-Zurqani (1611–1688)
