= Shihab al-Din al-Khafaji =

Egyptian poet (1569–1659)

Shihab al-Din al-Khafaji شهاب الدين الخفاجي
- Title: Shihab al-Din Ahmad b. Muhammad b. 'Umar al-Khafaji

Personal life
- Born: 977 A.H. = 1569 A.D.
- Died: 1069 A.H. = 1659 A.D.
- Region: Shanawan
- Main interest(s): Aqidah, Kalam (Islamic theology), Tawhid, Fiqh (Islamic jurisprudence), Usul al-Fiqh, Usul al-Din, Hadith studies, Tafsir, Logic, Philosophy, Arabic prosody, Arabic grammar, Arabic literature, Rhetoric, Poetry, Mathematics, Medicine
- Notable work(s): Commentary on Tafsir al-Baydawi, Nasim al-Riyad fi Sharh Shifa' al-Qadi 'Iyad

Religious life
- Religion: Islam
- Denomination: Sunni
- Jurisprudence: Hanafi, also studied Shafi'i jurisprudence
- Creed: Maturidi

Muslim leader
- Influenced by: Abu Hanifa Shams al-Din al-Ramli Al-Qadi 'Iyad Al-Baydawi Taqi al-Din al-Subki
- Influenced: 'Abd al-Qadir ibn 'Umar al-Baghdadi Muhammad Amin al-Muhibbi

Shihab al-Din Ahmad ibn Muhammad ibn Umar al-Khafaji (Arabic: شهاب الدين أحمد بن محمد بن عمر الخفاجي) was an Egyptian Hanafi-Maturidi scholar and poet who spent some time in Istanbul and while there was appointed Qadi al-Qudah (chief judge) of Egypt.

== Works ==
Among his well-known writings are:

- Hashiya (marginal commentary) on the Quranic commentary of al-Baydawi, titled: 'Inayat al-Qadi wa-Kifayat al-Radi.
- Commentary on al-Shifa bi Ta'rif Huquq al-Mustafa of al-Qadi 'Iyad, titled: Naseem al-Riyadh fi Sharh Shifa' al-Qadi 'Iyad.

== See also ==
- List of Hanafis
- List of Ash'aris and Maturidis
