= Maliki school =

School of Islamic jurisprudence

The Maliki school (Note: Arabic: ٱلْمَذْهَب ٱلْمَالِكِيّ, romanized: al-madhhab al-mālikī) or Malikism is one of the four major schools of Islamic jurisprudence within Sunni Islam. It was founded by Malik ibn Anas (c. 711–795 CE) in the 8th century. In contrast to the Ahl al-Hadith and Ahl al-Ra'y schools of thought, the Maliki school takes a unique position known as Ahl al-A'mal, in which they consider the Sunnah to be primarily sourced from the practice of the people of Medina and living Islamic traditions for their rulings on Islamic law.

The Maliki school is the second largest Sunni school, larger than the Shafi’i school but smaller than the Hanafi school. It is predominant in North Africa, West Africa and the Gulf states of Bahrain, Kuwait and United Arab Emirates. The current Maliki population is said to be around 500 million, comprising about 25% of the total Muslim population.

== History ==
Although Malik ibn Anas was himself a native of Medina, his school faced fierce competition for followers in the Muslim east, with the Shafi'i, Hanbali, and Zahiri schools all enjoying more success than Malik's school. It was eventually the Hanafi school, however, that earned official government favor from the Abbasids.

Imam Malik (who was a teacher of al-Shafi‘i, who in turn was a teacher of Imam Ahmad ibn Hanbal) was a student of Imam Ja'far al-Sadiq (a descendant of the Islamic prophet Muhammad and 6th Imam), the eponymous founder of the Twelver Shi'i Ja'fari school of law, as with Imam Abu Hanifah. Thus all of the four great Imams of Sunni jurisprudence are connected to Ja'far, whether directly or indirectly.

The Malikis enjoyed considerably more success in Africa, and for a while in Spain and Sicily. Under the Umayyads and their remnants, the Maliki school was promoted as the official state code of law, and Maliki judges had free rein over religious practices; in return, the Malikis were expected to support and legitimize the government's right to power. This dominance in Spanish Andalus from the Umayyads up to the Almoravids continued, with Islamic law in the region dominated by the opinions of Malik and his students. The hadith, or prophetic tradition in Islam, played a lesser role as Malikis—like Hanafi jurists—viewed it with suspicion, and weren't very well versed in its study. The Almoravids eventually gave way to the predominantly-Zahiri Almohads, at which point Malikis were tolerated at times but lost official favor. With the Reconquista, the Iberian Peninsula was lost to the Muslims in totality.

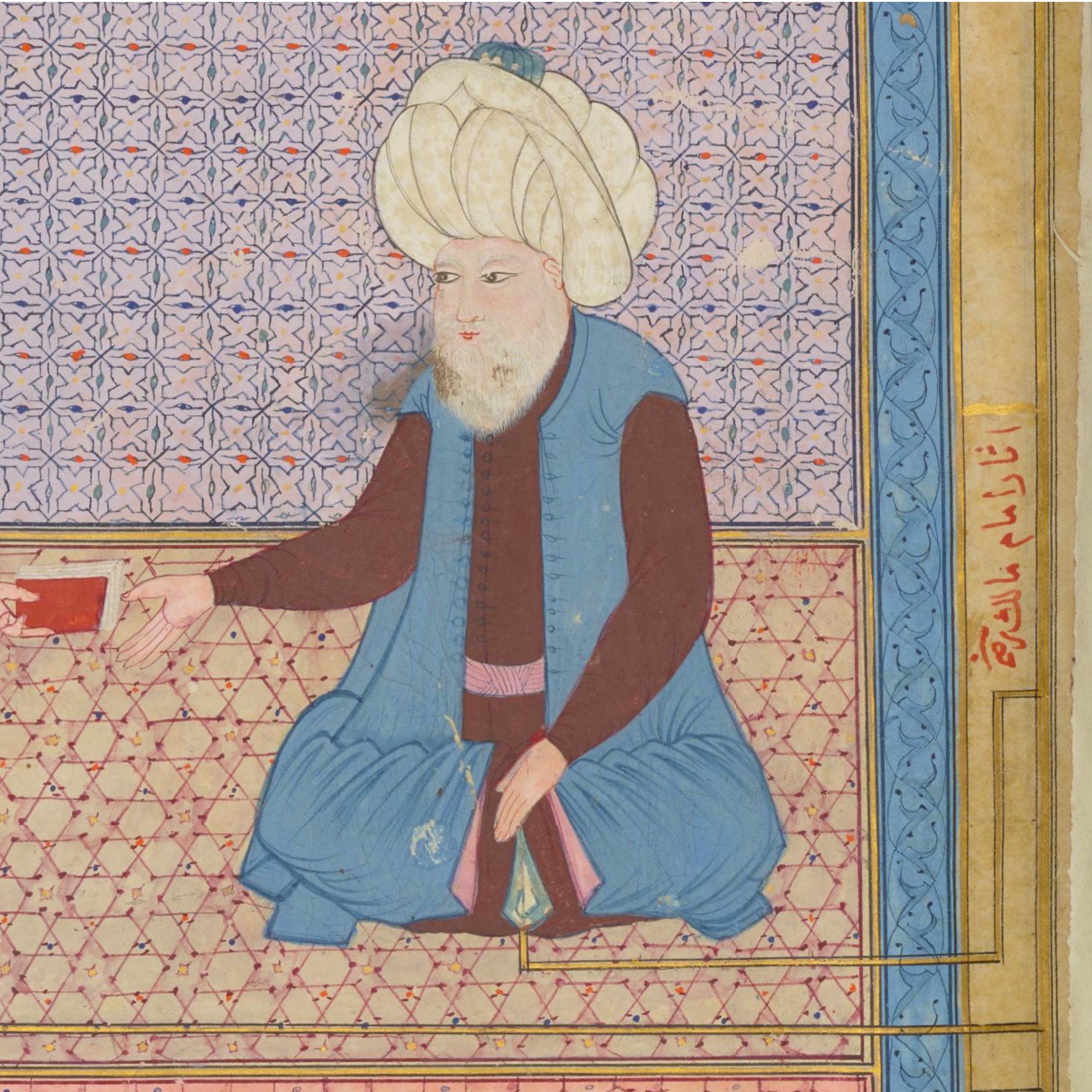
Illustration of a 1585-1590 Ottoman manuscript depicting Mālik ibn Anas

Although Al-Andalus was eventually lost, the Maliki has been able to retain its dominance throughout North and West Africa to this day. Additionally, the school has traditionally gained a reputation for being the preferred school in the small Arab States of the Persian Gulf (Bahrain, Kuwait, United Arab Emirates and Qatar). While the majority of Saudi Arabia follows Hanbali laws, the country's Eastern Province has been known as a Maliki stronghold for centuries. In the medieval era, the Maliki school was also found in parts of Europe under Islamic rule, particularly Islamic Spain and the Emirate of Sicily.

Although initially hostile to some mystical practices, Malikis eventually learned from Sufi practice, as the latter became widespread throughout North and West Africa, as well as Al-Andalus. Many Muslims now adhere to Maliki Sufi orders.

== Principles ==
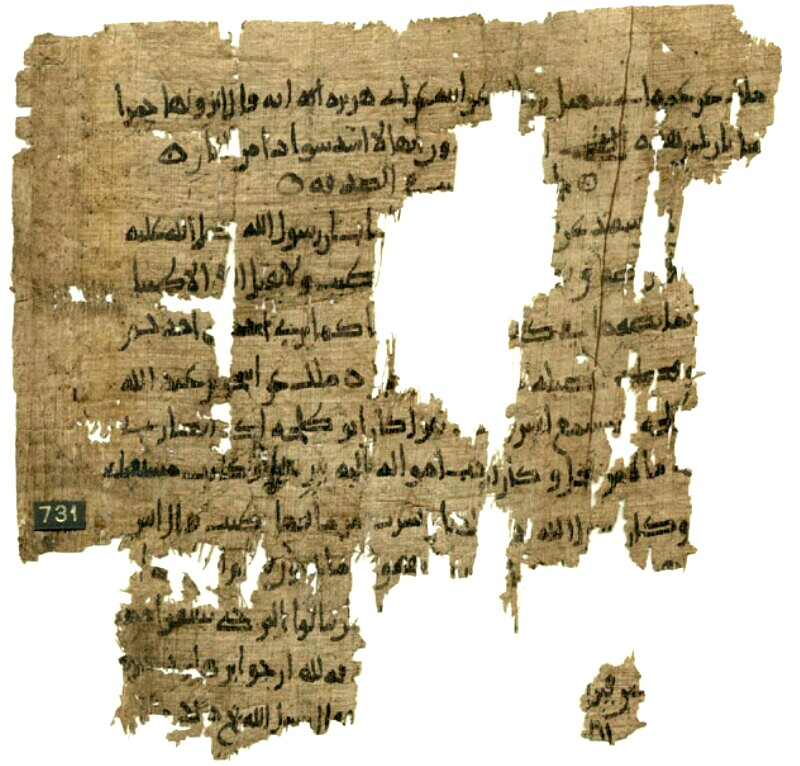
Earliest manuscript of Malik's Muwatta, dated to his lifetime

The Maliki school's sources for Sharia are hierarchically prioritized as follows: Quran, then Tawatur (mass-transmitted sayings, customs and actions of Muhammad);`Amal (customs and practices of the people of Medina and the Muslim world), followed by Ahad Hadith, and then followed by consensus of the Sahabah (the companions of Muhammad), then individual opinion from the Sahabah, Qiyas (analogy), Istislah (benefit of Islam and Muslims), and finally Urf (public opinion of people throughout the Muslim world).

The Mālikī school primarily derives from the work of Malik ibn Anas, particularly the Muwatta Imam Malik, also known as Al-Muwatta. The Muwaṭṭa contains Sahih Hadiths and includes Malik ibn Anas' commentary, but it is so complete that it is considered sahih by Malikis in itself. Mālik included the practices of the people of Medina and where the practices are in compliance with or in variance with the hadiths reported. This is because Mālik regarded the practices of Medina (the first three generations) to be a superior proof of the "living" sunnah than isolated, although sound, hadiths. Mālik was particularly scrupulous about authenticating his sources when he did appeal to them, as well as his comparatively small collection of aḥādith, known as al-Muwaṭṭah (or, The Straight Path). An example of the Maliki approach in using the opinion of Sahabah was recorded in Muwatta Imam Malik per ruling of cases regarding the law of consuming Gazelle meat. This tradition was used in the opinions of Zubayr ibn al-Awwam. Malik also included the daily practice of az-Zubayr as his source of "living sunnah" (living tradition) for his guideline to pass verdicts for various matters, in accordance with his school of thought method.

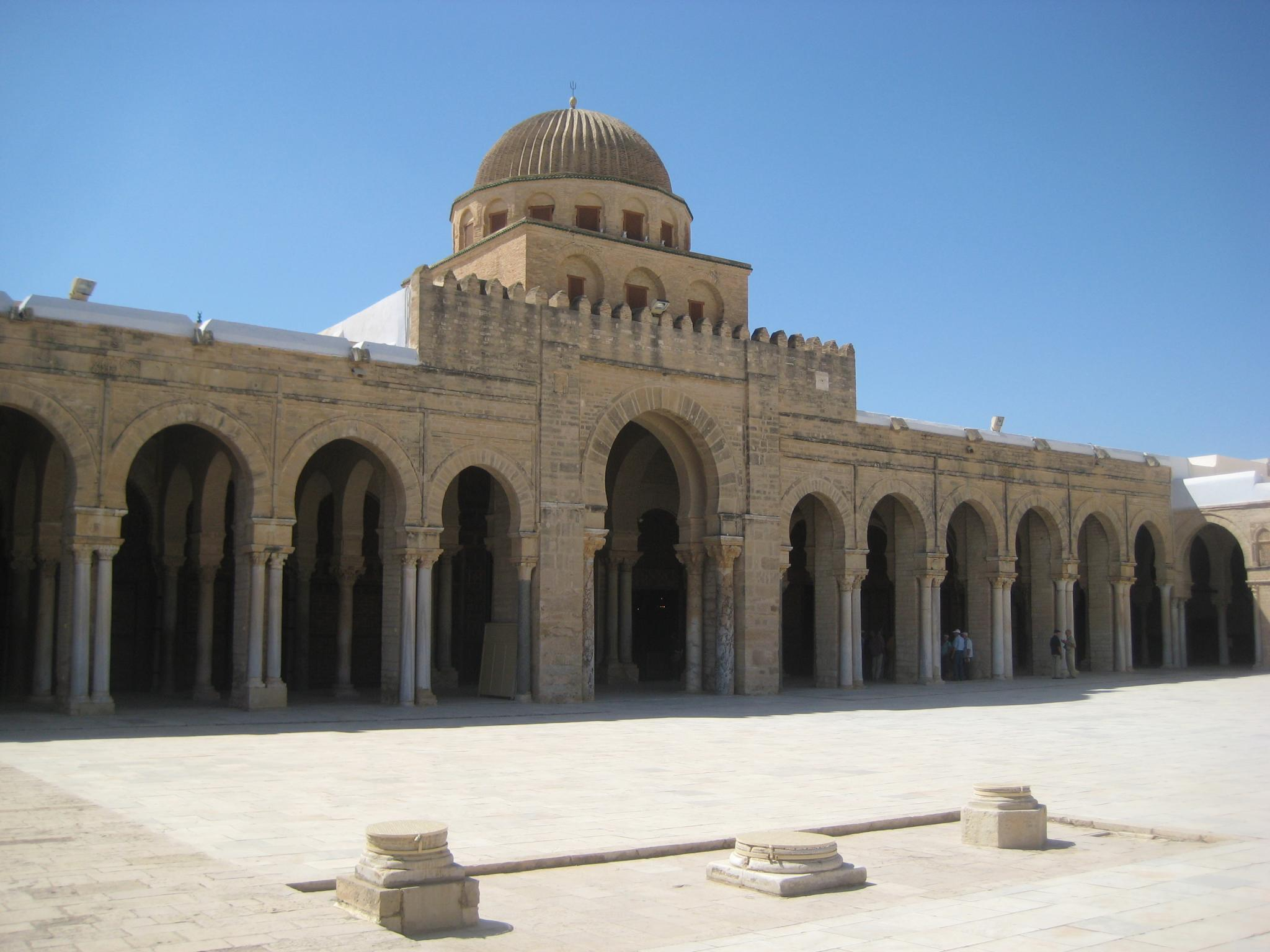
The Great Mosque of Kairouan, known since the 9th century as one of the most important Maliki centers. The Great Mosque of Kairouan is situated in the city of Kairouan in Tunisia.

The second source, the Al-Mudawwana, is the collaborator work of Mālik's longtime student, Ibn Qāsim and his mujtahid student, Sahnun. The Mudawwanah consists of the notes of Ibn Qāsim from his sessions of learning with Mālik and answers to legal questions raised by Saḥnūn in which Ibn Qāsim quotes from Mālik, and where no notes existed, his own legal reasoning based upon the principles he learned from Mālik. These two books, i.e. the Muwaṭṭah and Mudawwanah, along with other primary books taken from other prominent students of Mālik, would find their way into the Mukhtaṣar Khalīl, which would form the basis for the later Mālikī madhhab.

The Maliki school is most closely related to the Hanafi school, differing in degree, not in kind. However, unlike the Hanafi school, the Maliki school does not assign as much weight to qiyas (analogy), but derives its rulings from pragmatism using the principles of istislah (public benefit) and urf (common opinion) wherever the Quran and Mutawatir Hadiths do not provide explicit guidance.

=== Notable differences from other schools ===
The Maliki school differs from the other Sunni schools of law most notably in the sources it uses for derivation of rulings. Like all Sunni schools of Sharia, the Maliki school uses the Qur'an as primary source, followed by the sayings, customs/traditions and practices of Muhammad, mass-transmitted via mutawatir hadiths. In the Mālikī school, said tradition includes not only what was recorded in hadiths, but also the legal rulings of the four rightly guided caliphs – especially Umar.

Malik bin Anas himself also accepted binding consensus and analogical reasoning along with the majority of Sunni jurists, though with conditions. Consensus was only accepted as a valid source of law if it was drawn from the first generation of Muslims in general, or the first, second or third generations from Medina, while analogy was only accepted as valid as a last resort when an answer was not found in other sources.

== Demographics ==
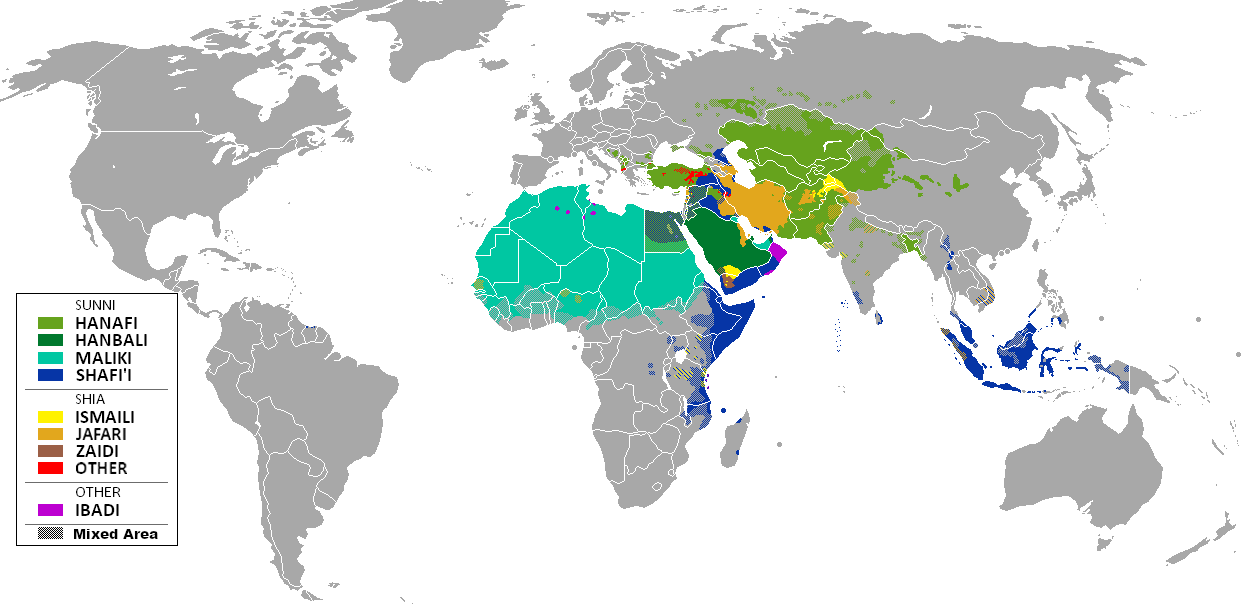
Sharia based on Maliki school (in teal) is the predominant Sunni school in North and West Africa.

Malikism is the largest school amongst Muslims in Africa. Worldwide, it comprises around 500 million followers, which is 25% of the total Muslim population. It is followed throughout West Asia and North Africa (excluding parts of Egypt). The Maliki school is also dominant school of the Gulf states of Bahrain, Kuwait and the United Arab Emirates, the latter of which sometimes uses Maliki jurisprudence in legal sharia rulings.

== Notable Mālikīs ==
- Ali ibn Ziyad (d. 799), Libyan scholar and companion of Malik, Brought Malik's Al-Muwatta to Ifriqiya
- Ibn al-Qasim (d. 806), Egyptian scholar and closest companion of Malik ibn Anas
- Ibn Wahb (d. 813), Egyptian scholar and one of Malik's closest companions
- Ibn Abd al-Hakam (d. 829), one of the Egyptian scholars who developed the Maliki school in Egypt
- Asbagh ibn al-Faraj (d. 840), Egyptian scholar
- Yahya al-Laithi (d. 848), Andalusian scholar, introduced the Maliki school in Al-Andalus
- Sahnun (AH 160/776–77 – AH 240/854–55), Sunnī jurist and author of the Mudawwanah, one of the most important works in Mālikī law
- Ibn Abi Zayd (310/922–386/996), Tunisian Sunnī jurist and author of the Risālah, a standard work in Mālikī law
- Qadi Abd al-Wahhab (d. 1031), Iraqi scholar and author of at-Talqin
- Yusuf ibn Abd al-Barr (d. 1071), Andalusian scholar
- Abu al-Walid al-Baji (d. 1081), Andalusian scholar. Author of al-Muntaqā and al-Istifā’
- Abu al-Hassan al-Lakhmi (d. 1085), Tunisian scholar and one of the four authoritative jurists according to Khalil. Author of at-Tabsira
- Ibn Tashfin (1061–1106), one of the prominent leaders of the Almoravid dynasty
- Ibn Rushd al-Jadd (d. 1126), one of the most notable scholars in Al-Andalus. Author of al-Bayān wa ʾl-taḥṣīl and grandfather of Averroes
- Al-Mazari (d. 1141), Sicilian scholar and student of al-Lakhmi. Author of al-Mu'lim bi Sahih Muslim. Authoritative work in the Maliki school
- Abu Bakr ibn al-Arabi (d. 1148), scholar and Qadi (Judge). Student of Al-Ghazali; Author of ʿĀriḍat al-Aḥwadhī and Aḥkām al-Qur’ān
- Qadi Iyad (d. 1149), an Imam and highly regarded Qadi in Maliki jurisprudence
- Ibn Rushd (Averroes) (1126–1198), philosopher and scholar
- Al-Qurtubi (1214–1273), Andalusian jurist and scholar
- Shihab al-Din al-Qarafi (1228–1285), Moroccan jurist and author who lived in Egypt
- Ibn al-Hajj (d. 1336), Moroccan scholar and theologian. Author of al-Madkhal
- Khalil ibn Ishaq al-Jundi (d. c. 1365), Egyptian jurist, author of Mukhtasar
- Ibn Battuta (24 February 1304 – 1377), explorer
- Ibn Khaldūn (1332/AH 732–1406/AH 808), scholar, historian and author of the Muqaddimah
- Abu Ishaq al-Shatibi (d. 1388), a famous Andalusian Maliki jurist
- Ibn Farhun (d. 1397), Arab historian and qādi (judge). Author of Al-Dībāj
- Sidi Boushaki (d. 1453), a famous Algerian Maliki jurist
- Sidi Abd al-Rahman al-Tha'alibi (d. 1479), a famous Algerian Maliki jurist
- Sidi Ahmed Rguibi (1590–1665) Sahrawi preacher and progenitor of the Reguibat tribe
- Al-Hattab (d. 1547), Libyan scholar. Author of Mawahib al-Jalil, which was one of the first major commentaries on Khalil's Mukhtassar (Concise Text)
- Muhammad al-Kharashi (d. 1690), Egyptian Maliki cleric. First Grand Imam of Al-Azhar
- Muhammad al-Zurqani (d. 1710), Egyptian scholar. Author of Sharh al-Mawahib al-Ladunniyyah, a commentary of Al-Qastallani's Al-Muwahib al-Ladunniyyah
- Abd al-Aziz al-Dabbagh (d. 1718/19), Moroccan Islamic scholar and Sufi mystic
- Al-Bannani (d. 1780), Moroccan scholar. Author of Al-Fath ar-Rabbani (The Endowment of Divine Grace). The text is a sub-commentary on the classical Mukhtasar of Khalil
- Ahmad al-Dardir (d. 1786), Egyptian Sufischolar, poet and theologian. Author of both Sharh as-Saghir and Sharh al-Kabir two of the most important books of fatwa (Islamic legal rulings) in the Maliki school

=== Contemporary Malikis ===
- Usman dan Fodio (1754–1817), founder of the Sokoto Caliphate
- Abdullahi dan Fodio (1766–1829), Sufi and brother of Usman dan Fodio
- El Hadj Umar Tall (1794–1864), founder of the Toucouleur Empire
- Emir Abdelkader (1808–1883), Algerian Sufi and politician, religious and military leader who led a struggle against the French colonial invasion
- Ahmad At Tijânî Ibn Bâba Al 'Alawî (d. 1888), Mauritanian jurist and imam
- Omar Mukhtar (1862–1931), Libyan resistance leader
- Ahmad al-Alawi (1869–1934), Algerian Sufi leader
- Muhammad al-Tahir ibn Ashur (1879–1973) Tunisian Islamic scholar and qadi
- René Guénon (1888–1951), French metaphysician and scholar of the Traditionalist school
- Rodolfo Gil Benumeya (1901–1975), Spanish Arabist and historian of Al-Andalus
- Abdalqadir as-Sufi (1930–2021), Scottish shaykh and founder of the Murabitun World Movement
- Abdallah bin Bayyah (born 1935), Mauritanian scholar and professor of Islamic studies at King Abdulaziz University
- Hassan Cissé (1945–2008), Senegalese scholar for Tijani Sufism
- Sa'adu Abubakar (born 1956), 20th Sultan of Sokoto and spiritual leader of Nigeria's Sunni Muslims
- Hamza Yusuf (born 1958), American scholar and co-founder of Zaytuna College
- Abu Layth (born 1978), British scholar and teacher
- Ahmed Saad Al-Azhari (born 1978), Egyptian–British Islamic scholar and a graduate of Al-Azhar university. Saad was formerly a Shafi’i before adopting the Maliki school
- Abdullahi Aliyu Sumaila (1946–2003), Nigerian scholar, administrator and politician

== See also ==
- Outline of Islam
- Glossary of Islam
- List of Islamic scholars
- The Seven Fuqaha of Medina
- The four Sunni Imams
- Malikization of the Maghreb
- Malikism in Algeria
- Adhan
- Islamic views on sin
