= Abd-al-Baqi al-Zurqani =

Egyptian Islamic scholar (1611–1688)

Personal life
- Born: Abd al-Baqiy ibn Yusuf ibn Ahmad ibn Muhammad ibn Ulwan al-Zurqani; 1020 AH/1611 CE Egypt
- Died: 1099 AH/1688 CE Egypt
- Main interest(s): Islamic law, Commentary
- Notable work(s): Commentary on Al-Jundi's Mukhtasar Khalil

Religious life
- Religion: Islam
- Denomination: Sunni
- Jurisprudence: Maliki

Senior posting
- Influenced: Muhammad al-Zurqani

Abd al-Baqi al-Zurqani (1611–1688) was an Islamic scholar from Egypt, connected to Al-Azhar. His full name was Abd al-Baqiy ibn Yusuf ibn Ahmad ibn Muhammad ibn Ulwan al-Zurqani. He is the father of Muhammad al-Zurqani and the commentator of al-Jundi's Mukhtasar Khalil, itself annotated by Muhammad ibn al-Hassan al-Bannani (1113-1194/1701-1780), titled al-Fath al-Rabbani.

== Works ==
- Commentary on Al-Jundi's Mukhtasar

== See also ==
- List of Islamic scholars
