= Sharh al-Mawahib al-Ladunniyyah =

Sharh al-Mawahib al-Ladunniyyah is an eight volumes collection authored by Islamic scholar Muhammad al-Zurqani, a commentary of Al-Qastallani's Al-Muwahib al-Ladunniyyah.

== See also ==
- List of Sunni books
