= Abu Ishaq al-Saffar al-Bukhari =

Uzbek Maturidi Sunni theologian (1067/8–1139)

Abu Ishaq al-Saffar al-Bukhari أبو إسحاق الصفّار البخاري
- Title: Rukn al-Islam (the Pillar of Islam)

Personal life
- Born: 460 A.H. = 1067-8 A.D. Bukhara
- Died: 534 A.H. = 1139 A.D. Bukhara
- Era: Islamic Golden Age
- Region: Transoxiana, modern-day Uzbekistan
- Main interest(s): Aqidah, Kalam (Islamic theology), Fiqh (Islamic jurisprudence)
- Notable work: Talkhis al-Adilla li-Qawa'id al-Tawhid

Religious life
- Religion: Islam
- Denomination: Sunni
- Jurisprudence: Hanafi
- Creed: Maturidi

Muslim leader
- Influenced by: Abu Hanifa Abu Mansur al-Maturidi
- Influenced: Abu al-Barakat al-Nasafi

Abu Ishaq al-Saffar al-Bukhari (Arabic: أبو إسحاق الصفّار البخاري), was an important representative of the Sunni theological school of Abu Mansur al-Maturidi (d. c. 333/944) and the author of Talkhis al-Adilla li-Qawa'id al-Tawhid (Arabic: تلخيص الأدلّة لقواعد التوحيد) which is a voluminous kalam work.

He lived in Bukhara under the dominance of West Karakhanids. His theological works, his method in kalam, and frequent reference to his works by Ottoman and Arab scholars indicate that al-Saffar is a respected and authoritative Hanafi-Maturidi theologian who systematically established his ideas about kalam believing that information based upon reason, revealed knowledge and senses are determinative in his area.

== Name ==
Abu Ishaq Ibrahim b. Isma'il b. Ahmad b. Ishaq b. Shayth, known as al-Zahid al-Saffar.

The alternative name Ibrahim b. Ishaq, recorded by Brockelmann in his GAL, is found only in the British Museum manuscript no. 1577, Add. 27526, and is presumably erroneous, since the few bibliographical sources that mention al-Saffar call him Ibn Isma'il.

== Books ==
In his work titled Talkhis al-Adilla li-Qawa'id al-Tawhid on kalām, (Note: The word 'kalam' literally means discourse, logos or speech, often the speech of God; but technically it refers to the Islamic speculative theology as a whole. The word kalam in reference to the words of God occurs four times in the Qur'an, twice in reference to the Torah (Q2:75; 7:144), and twice to the Qur'an itself (Q9:6; 48:15).) he wrote extensively about al-Asma' al-Husna (the Most Beautiful Names of God). Approximately one third of this work, published in two volumes, was devoted to al-Asma' al-Husna. In the pre-Saffar Hanafi-Maturidi theological literature, there was no other work that addressed al-Asma' al-Husna in such an extensive way.

== See also ==
- Abu Hanifa
- Abu Mansur al-Maturidi
- Abu al-Yusr al-Bazdawi
- Abu al-Mu'in al-Nasafi
- List of Maturidis
- List of Muslim theologians

Early Islamic scholars

Muhammad, The final Messenger of God (570–632) the Constitution of Medina, taught the Quran, and advised his companions
Abdullah ibn Masud (died 653) taught | Ali (607–661) fourth caliph taught | Aisha, Muhammad's wife and Abu Bakr's daughter taught | Abd Allah ibn Abbas (618–687) taught | Zayd ibn Thabit (610–660) taught | Umar (579–644) second caliph taught | Abu Hurairah (603–681) taught
Alqama ibn Qays (died 681) taught | Husayn ibn Ali (626–680) taught | Qasim ibn Muhammad ibn Abi Bakr (657–725) taught and raised by Aisha | Urwah ibn Zubayr (died 713) taught by Aisha, he then taught | Said ibn al-Musayyib (637–715) taught | Abdullah ibn Umar (614–693) taught | Abd Allah ibn al-Zubayr (624–692) taught by Aisha, he then taught
Ibrahim al-Nakha’i taught | Ali ibn Husayn Zayn al-Abidin (659–712) taught | Hisham ibn Urwah (667–772) taught | Ibn Shihab al-Zuhri (died 741) taught | Salim ibn Abd-Allah ibn Umar taught | Umar ibn Abdul Aziz (682–720) raised and taught by Abdullah ibn Umar
Hammad ibn Abi Sulayman taught | Muhammad al-Baqir (676–733) taught | Farwah bint al-Qasim Jafar's mother
Abu Hanifa (699–767) wrote Al Fiqh Al Akbar and Kitab Al-Athar, jurisprudence followed by Sunni, Sunni Sufi, Barelvi, Deobandi, Zaidiyyah and originally by the Fatimid and taught | Zayd ibn Ali (695–740) | Ja'far bin Muhammad Al-Baqir (702–765) Muhammad and Ali's great great grand son, jurisprudence followed by Shia, he taught | Malik ibn Anas (711–795) wrote Muwatta, jurisprudence from early Medina period now mostly followed by Maliki Sunnis in North Africa, and taught | Al-Waqidi (748–822) wrote history books like Kitab al-Tarikh wa al-Maghazi, student of Malik ibn Anas | Abu Muhammad Abdullah ibn Abdul Hakam (died 829) wrote biographies and history books, student of Malik ibn Anas
Abu Yusuf (729–798) wrote Usul al-fiqh | Muhammad al-Shaybani (749–805) | al-Shafi‘i (767–820) wrote Al-Risala, jurisprudence followed by Shafi'i Sunnis and Sufis, and taught | Ismail ibn Ibrahim | Ali ibn al-Madini (778–849) wrote The Book of Knowledge of the Companions | Ibn Hisham (died 833) wrote early history and As-Sirah an-Nabawiyyah, Muhammad's biography
Isma'il ibn Ja'far (719–775) | Musa al-Kadhim (745–799) | Ahmad ibn Hanbal (780–855) wrote Musnad Ahmad ibn Hanbal jurisprudence followed by Hanbali Sunnis and Sufis | Muhammad al-Bukhari (810–870) wrote Sahih al-Bukhari hadith books | Muslim ibn al-Hajjaj (815–875) wrote Sahih Muslim hadith books | Dawud al-Zahiri (815–883/4) founded the Zahiri school | Muhammad ibn Isa at-Tirmidhi (824–892) wrote Jami` at-Tirmidhi hadith books | Al-Baladhuri (died 892) wrote early history Futuh al-Buldan, Genealogies of the Nobles
Ibn Majah (824–887) wrote Sunan ibn Majah hadith book | Abu Dawood (817–889) wrote Sunan Abu Dawood Hadith Book
Muhammad ibn Ya'qub al-Kulayni (864- 941) wrote Kitab al-Kafi hadith book followed by Twelver Shia | Muhammad ibn Jarir al-Tabari (838–923) wrote History of the Prophets and Kings, Tafsir al-Tabari | Abu al-Hasan al-Ash'ari (874–936) wrote Maqālāt al-islāmīyīn, Kitāb al-luma, Kitāb al-ibāna 'an usūl al-diyāna
Ibn Babawayh (923–991) wrote Man La Yahduruhu al-Faqih jurisprudence followed by Twelver Shia | Sharif Razi (930–977) wrote Nahj al-Balagha followed by Twelver Shia | Nasir al-Din al-Tusi (1201–1274) wrote jurisprudence books followed by Ismaili and Twelver Shia | Al-Ghazali (1058–1111) wrote The Niche for Lights, The Incoherence of the Philosophers, The Alchemy of Happiness on Sufism | Rumi (1207–1273) wrote Masnavi, Diwan-e Shams-e Tabrizi on Sufism
Key: Some of Muhammad's Companions | Key: Taught in Medina | Key: Taught in Iraq | Key: Worked in Syria | Key: Travelled extensively collecting the sayings of Muhammad and compiled books of hadith | Key: Worked in Persia
