= Al-Mazari =

12th-century Tunisian jurist

Abu 'Abd Allah Muhammad ibn Ali at-Tamimi al-Maziri
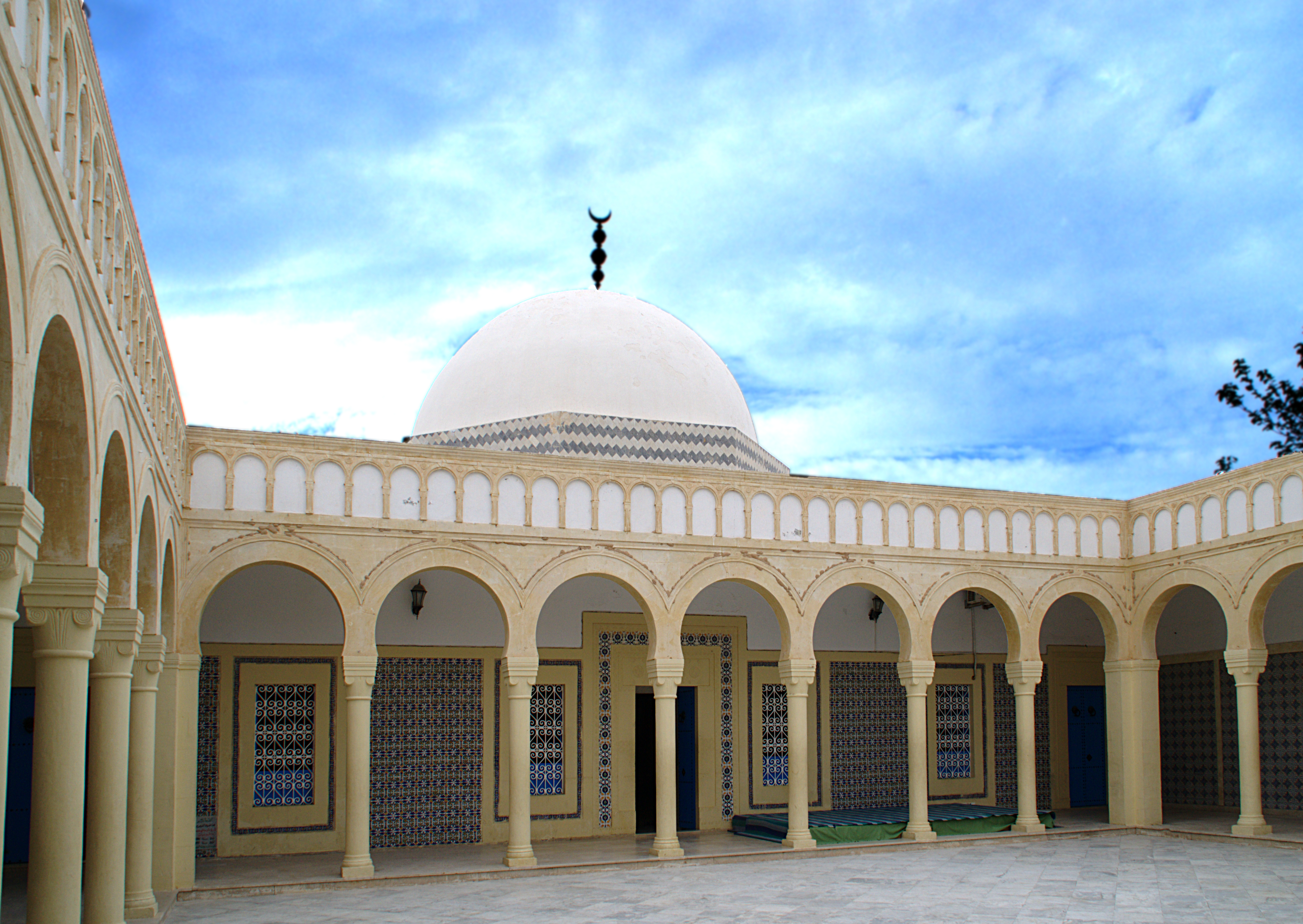
- Tomb of Imam al-Maziri in Monastir, Tunisia.
- Title: al-Imam

Personal life
- Born: 1061 CE (453 AH); Mazara del Vallo, Emirate of Sicily
- Died: 1141 CE (536 AH); Mahdia, Zirid Dynasty
- Era: Fatimid Caliphate
- Region: Ifriqiya (modern day Tunisia)
- Main interest: Fiqh
- Notable work: al-Mu'lim bi Sahih Muslim (The Legal Opinions of al-Maziri)

Religious life
- Religion: Islam
- Denomination: Sunni
- Jurisprudence: Maliki
- Creed: Ash'ari

Muhammad ibn Ali ibn Omar ibn Muhammad al-Tamimi al-Maziri (Arabic: محمد بن علي بن عمر بن محمد التميمي المازري) (1061 – 1141 CE) (453 AH – 536 AH ), simply known as Al-Maziri or as Imam al-Maziri and Imam al-Mazari, was an important Arab Muslim jurist in the Maliki school of Sunni Islamic Law. He was one of the most important figures in the school and his opinions are well known and respected to this day. Al-Maziri was one of four jurists whose positions were held as authoritative by Khalil ibn Ishaq in his Mukhtassar, which is the most important of the later texts in the relied upon positions of the school. It is for this reason that he is referred to simply as al-Imam (the Imam) within the Maliki school.

== Early life ==
Al-Maziri was described as a member of the tribe of Banu Tamim. There is a difference of opinion as to where Muhammad al-Maziri was born. Many sources state his place of birth as Mazara (modern day Mazara del Vallo) on the Western Sicilian coast. Others state that he was born in Mahdia, the Tunisian city where he lived for most of his life and also died, among the most famous jurists and historians to place al-Maziri's place of birth as Sicily was the Medinan Maliki scholar Ibn Farhun. He was born in 1061 CE (453 AH), the year in which Roger I of Sicily crossed from the Italian mainland and began his thirty-year conquest of Sicily from the Muslims. Muhammad spent his early life studying as a young boy in Mazara, in the South of the island, before he and his family crossed to Mahdia in modern-day Tunisia and settled there. Historians state the impending Christian invasion as the reason for their emigration.

Al-Maziri's descent was from the Banu Tamim, an Arab tribe from which the Aghlabid rulers of North Africa and the Mediterranean islands descended from. The Banu Tamim had been one of the first Arab tribes to immigrate to North Africa from Arabia during the early conquest of Uqba ibn Nafi in the 7th century CE. Al-Maziri's distant grandfather was amongst the army led by Asad ibn al-Furat who conquered Sicily in the 9th century CE.

The context in which al-Maziri was raised in Ifriqiya was equally turbulent to his Sicilian hometown. The political and social environment in the Maghreb was upheaved by the immigration of hundreds of thousands of Arab bedouins to North Africa as punishment by the Fatimid rulers to the Zirids for their cut from the Shiite Caliphate and pledging of allegiance to the Sunni Caliph of Baghdad. The event led to the sacking of Ifriqiya's cities, the most important of which was the capital Kairouan, and the departure of many scholars to Andalusia and elsewhere. Nevertheless, al-Maziri and his family remained, and he grew up in the newly fortified Zirid capital of Mahdia. The turbulent events in which al-Maziri was raised have led historians to link his upbringing with his generally cautious character.

== Education and Works ==
Al-Maziri was very reserved when it came to giving or recording information about his life and educational background. Historians therefore use his fatawa (or legal opinions) to discern who he studied under and what people and places had the most profound influence on his life. Al-Maziri travelled throughout North Africa in his quest for his knowledge to cities such as Tunis, Gabès, Gafsa, Tripoli and Alexandria. The scholar who had one of the strongest influences on al-Maziri was Abdul-Hamid ibn al-Saigh. It is also certain that he studied under the equally famous Tunisian Maliki scholar al-Lakhmi.

== Legacy ==
Al-Maziri has a broad intellectual legacy. To this day there is a square named Imam al-Mazari square in Mazara del Vallo, the Sicilian town of his birth.

Judge Iyad is quoted to have said "He is the last... of African elders to achieve jurisprudence, the rank of ijtihad and the accuracy of consideration, his time for the owner in the countries of the earth did not have a horizon from him and I do not do their doctrine"

== See also ==
- List of Ash'aris and Maturidis
