= Al-Shifa bi Ta'rif Huquq al-Mustafa =

Book by Qadi Ayyad

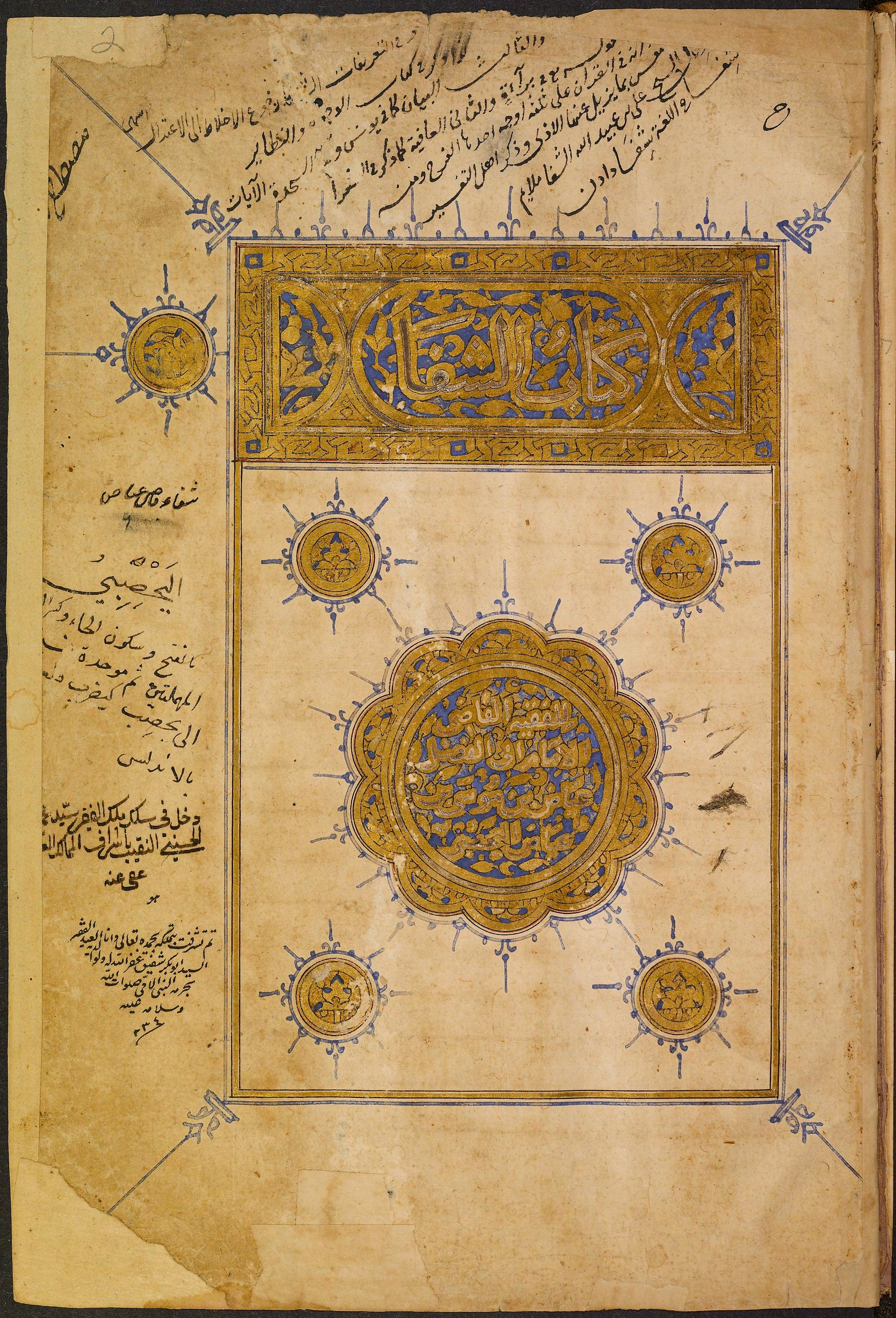
The cover of an ash-Shifa, 15th century

Al-Shifa bi Ta'rif Huquq al-Mustafa, (Arabic: الشفا بتعريف حقوق المصطفى, The Remedy by the Recognition of the Rights of the Chosen One [Muhammad]), of Qadi Ayyad (d. 544H / 1149CE) is perhaps the most frequently used and commented upon handbook in which Muhammad's life, his qualities and his miracles are described in every detail. Generally known by its short title, ash-Shifa or al-Shifa (The Healing), this work was so highly admired throughout the Muslim world that it soon acquired a sanctity of its own, for it is said, "If al-Shifa is found in a house, this house will not suffer any harm... when a sick person reads it or it is recited to him, Allah will restore his health."

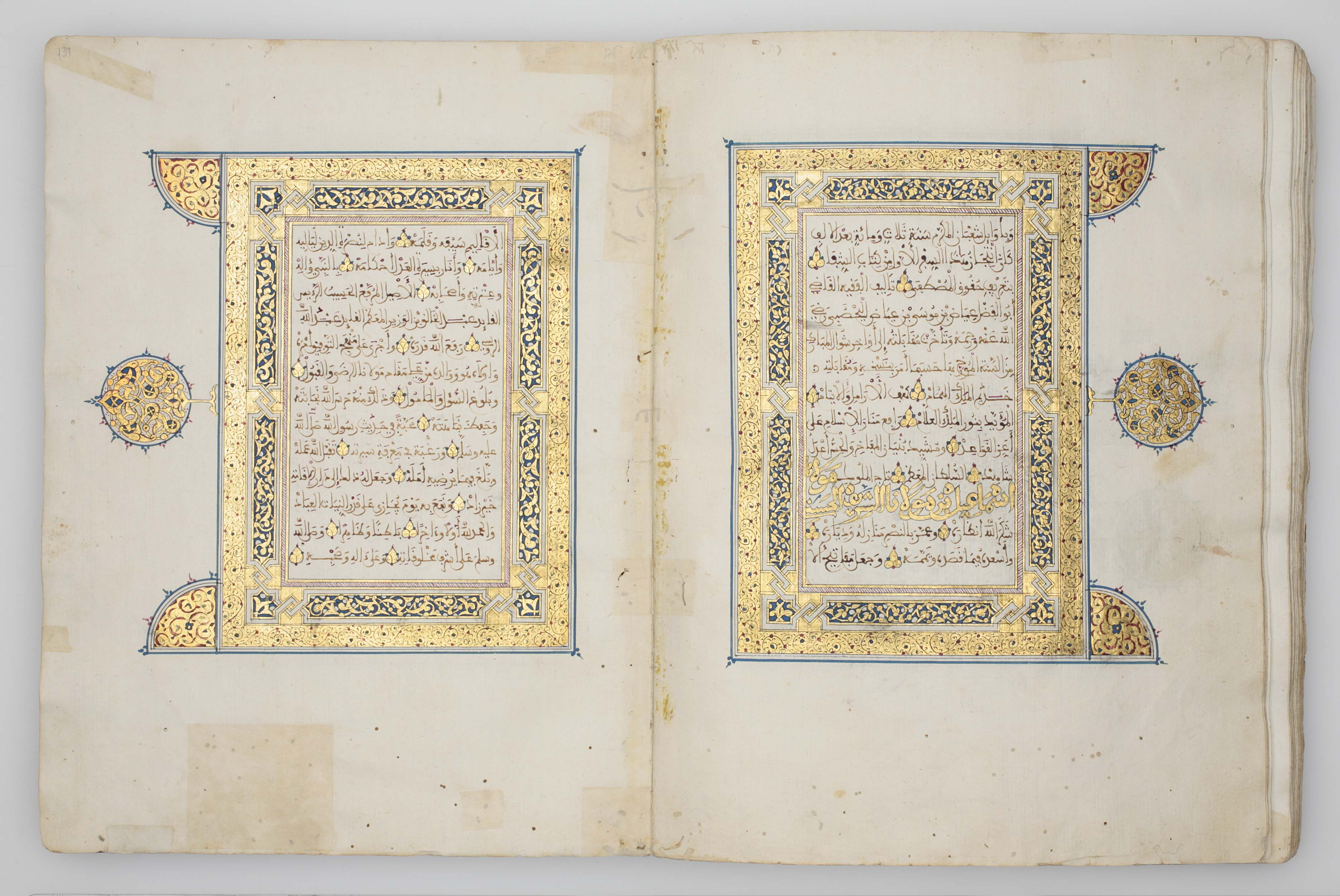
Royal copy of the Ash-Shifa from 17th century Morocco, commissioned by Ismail ibn Sharif.

Ash-Shifa remains one of the most commentated books of Islam after the Sahih's of Muhammad al-Bukhari and Muslim ibn al-Hajjaj. Commentaries and partial explanations written on al-Shifa include:

- Majlis fi Khatmi Kitab al-Shifa' bi Taʿrif Huquq al-Muṣṭafá by Shams al-Din Muhammad ibn ʿAbdullah ibn Muhammad al-Qaysi al-Dimashqi.
- Al-Intihad fi Khatmi al-Shifa' li-ʿIyad by al-Sakhawi.
- Nasim al-Riyad fi Sharh Shifa' li-Qadi ʿIyad in 4 volumes by Shihab al-Din al-Khafaji.
- Sharh al-Shifa' li-al-Qadi ʿAyyad in 2 volumes by Ali al-Qari.
- Manahil as-Safa fi Takhrij Ahadith al-Shifa by al-Suyuti.
- Al-Shifāʾ bī Taʾrif Ḥuqūq al-Muṣṭafá and al-ʿAta fī Maʿrifa al-Muṣṭafá (4 volumes) by Muhammad Tahir-ul-Qadri.
- Al-Madad al-ʿIyad by al-Shaykh Hasan al-ʿAdawi al-Hamzawi.
- Mazil al-Khafa' ʿan alfaz al-Shifa by al-ʿAllama Taqi al-Din Ahmad ibn Muhammad ibn Hasan al-Shamsi al-Tamimi al-Dari al-Hanafi.
- Al-Muqtafa fi hal alfaz al-Shifa' by al-ʿAllama Burhan al-Din Ibrahim ibn Muhammad ibn Khalil al-Halabi Sibt ibn al-ʿAjami.

Ash-Shifa has been translated into numerous languages such as English, Turkish,, Albanian and Urdu.

== See also ==
- List of Sunni books
- Sira - Biographies of Prophet Muhammed
- Dalail al-Khayrat
