= Boushaki =

Boushaki may refer to:

== People ==
- Amine Boushaki (born 1982), Algerian judoka
- Brahim Boushaki (1912–1997), Algerian theologian
- Mohamed Seghir Boushaki (1869–1959), Algerian politician
- Mustapha Ishak Boushaki (born 1967), Algerian academician
- Sidi Boushaki (1394–1453), Algerian theologian
- Yahia Boushaki (1935–1960), Algerian politician and military

== Places ==
- Yahia Boushaki, neighbourhood in Algiers
- Zawiyet Sidi Boushaki, a Sufi zawiya in Algeria

== Science ==
- Poem of Sidi Boushaki, Book of Arabic grammar

== See also ==
- Abu Ishaq
