= Al-Muwahib al-Ladunniyyah =

Book by Al-Qastallani

Al-Muwahib al-ladunniyya bi al-minah al-Muhammadiyya is a book by Islamic scholar Al-Qastallani. The book was commented in Sharh al-Mawahib al-Ladunniyyah (8 volumes) by Muhammad al-Zurqani.

It was abridged by Yusuf an-Nabhani (1350/1931).

An English translation of a portion of the book is the third chapter of "Mawlid: Its Permissibility; Its Necessity: Its Reality", published by as-Sunnah Foundation of America.

== See also ==
- List of Sunni books
