= Ibn Bashkuwal =

Andalusian traditionalist and biographer

Ibn Bashkuwāl
- Born: September , 1101; Córdoba
- Died: January 5, 1183; Sarrión
- Other names: Chalaf ibn'Abd al-Malik ibn Mas'udd ibn Mūsā ibn Bashkuwāl, Abūl-Qāsim (خلف بن عبد الملك بن مسعود بن موسى بن بشكوال, أبو القاسم), and Ḫalaf b.'Abd al- Malik b. Mas'ūd b. Mūsā b. Baškuwāl, Abū'l-Qāsim
- Occupations: Biographer, historian, encyclopedist

Ibn Bashkuwāl, Khalaf ibn ‘Abd al-Malik ibn Mas'ud ibn Musa ibn Bashkuwāl ibn Yûsuf al-Ansârī, Abū'l-Qāsim (خلف بن عبد الملك بن مسعود بن موسى بن بشكوال بن يوسف, أبو القاسم; var. Ḫalaf b.'Abd al- Malik b. Mas'ūd b. Mūsā b. Baškuwāl, Abū'l-Qāsim; September 1101 – 5 January 1183), was an influential Andalusian traditionist and biographer working in Córdoba and Seville.

== Life ==
His ancestry was Arab and was a descendant of al-Ansar- he was known as Ibn Bashkuwāl ("son of Pasqual") in the Valencia region. His first teacher was his father (d.1139), to whom he dedicates a section in his biographical work. He studied with the most famous scholars of his time: Ibn al-'Arabī al-Ma'āfirī and the lawyer Abūl-Walīd ibn Ruschd (died 1126), the grandfather of the philosopher Averroës. In his hometown he worked as a consulting lawyer (faqīh mušāwar) and for a short time as deputy Qādī in Seville under Ibn al-'Arabī. It appears he never travelled to the East and his scholarship derived from the Andalusian-Islamic tradition. His biographer Ibn Abbār (d. Jan 1260) mentions 41 scholars in Córdoba and Seville, with whom he studied. His library held works by authors from the Islamic East; of which is the K. as-Siyar from Abū Ishāq al-Fazārī, on whose title page he is documented as the owner of the work.

He died in January 1183 and was buried in the cemetery known then as Ibn 'Abbās Scholars’ Cemetery in Córdoba

== Works ==
Ibn Bashkuwāl's biographers attribute him authorship of twenty-six known books, treatises and monographs of biographical content, and list his teachers and the texts he studied. Among his few surviving works are:

- Aṣ-ṣila fī ta'rīḫ a'immat al-Andalus (الصلة في تاريخ أئمة الأندلس), ‘Continuation of the scholarly history of al-Andalus’; continuation of Ibn al-Faraḍī's (d. 1013) famous biographical dictionary of Islamic Spain's scholars, which contains 1541 biographies of 11th and 12th century Andalusian scholars. In a dedicated chapter (faṣl) he presents the life of the so-called "strangers" (al-ghurabā), who came to al-Andalus from the Orient and Ifrīqiya.
  - Ibn al-Abbār (1199-1260) from Valencia wrote the supplement (Takmilat K. as-ṣila) and filled some gaps found in the original work. In the first volume he wrote a detailed biography of Ibn Baškuwāl.
  - Another supplement and continuation of Ibn Baškuwāl's work was written by Ibn az-Zubair al-Gharnāṭī (1230, Jaén (Jayyān) – 1309, Granada (Gharnāṭa)) entitled ilat aṣ-ṣila ('The continuation of the ṣila') or: 'The story of the scholars of al-Andalus, in which he (the author) of the Kitāb aṣ-ṣila continued by Ibn Baškuwāl'. This book deals with the Andalusian scholars of the 12th and 13th centuries. A fragment of the work was published by the French orientalist Évariste Lévi-Provençal in 1937 (Rabat). Three further volumes with corrections and additions to the first edition were published in 1993 (Rabat).
- Kitāb ġawāmiḍ al-asmā' al-mubhama al-wāqi'a fī-'l-aḥādīṯ al-musnada (كتاب غوامض الأسماء المبهمة الواقعة في الأحاديث المسندة), ‘Secrets of indistinct names found in Hadiths with complete Isnads’; two-volume biographical compilation and explanation of personal names, names of ancestry contradictorily, or incorrectly, reported in the literature.
- Shuyūḥ'Abd Allāh ibn Wahb al-Qurashī (شيوخ عبد الله بن وهب القرشي), ‘Teachers of 'Abd Allāh ibn Wahb al-Qurashī’; biographical dictionary of teachers of the Egyptian scholar 'Abdallāh ibn Wahb with rich information about its importance as a primary source of Ibn Wahb. Contains an appended biography of Ibn Wahb.
- Kitāb al-mustaġīṯīn bi-lāhāhi (كتاب المستغيثين بالله), ‘Book of the beseechers of God’; collected hadith with complete isnād traditions containing the Holy Du'ā ' intercessions. In this work Ibn Bashkuwāl cites the titles and authors of thirteen source works. At the beginning of this collection for example, the intercession of the Islamic prophet Muḥammad in the Battle of Badr is linked to the Qur’ān verse:

(Remember) when you cried out to your Lord for help, He answered, "I will reinforce you with a thousand angels - followed by many others"

— Quran 8:9, translation: Dr. Mustafa Khattab, The Clear Quran

== Sources ==
- The Encyclopaedia of Islam. New Edition. Brill. Leiden. Vol. 3, p. 733
- Manuela Marín (ed.): Ibn Baškuwāl (m 578/1183): Kitāb al-mustagīṯīn bi-llāh. (En busca del socorro divino). Fuentes Arábico-Hispanas. 8th Madrid 1991.
- Carl Brockelmann: History of Arabic Literature. 2nd Edition. Brill, Leiden 1943. Vol.1, p. 415
- Fuat Sezgin: History of Arabic Literature. Vol.1. Brill, Leiden 1967.
- Qāsim'Alī Sa'd: Muḥaddiṯ al-Andalus al-Ḥāfiẓ al-mu'arriḫ Abū'l-Qāsim b. Baškuwāl. Šaḫṣiyyatu-hu wa-mu'allafātu-hu. ('The Hadith scholar of al-Andalus, the historian Abū'l-Qāsim b Baškuwāl, his personality and his works'). In: Maǧallat Ǧāmi'at Umm al-Qurā li-'ulūm aš-šarī'a wa -'l-luġa al-'arabiyya wa-dābi-hā. Vol.18, n.28 (Mecca, 2003), p. 222-288 (in Arabic)
