= Qadi Iyad =

Arab scholar of Maliki fiqh (1083–1149)

Imam Qāḍī ʿIyāḍ قاضي عياض
- Title: Shaykh al-Islām; Al-Ḥāfiẓ; Qāḍī

Personal life
- Born: 1083 Ceuta, Almoravid empire
- Died: 1149 (aged 65–66) Marrakesh, Almohad empire
- Era: Islamic Golden Age
- Main interest(s): Islamic theology (Kalam), Fiqh, Hadith, History, Legal theory, Tafsir, Arabic language, Genealogy, Poetry
- Notable work: Ash-Shifa
- Occupation: Scholar, muhaddith, qadi, jurist, legal theorist, mufassir, grammarian, linguist, historian, genealogist, poet

Religious life
- Religion: Islam
- Denomination: Sunni
- Jurisprudence: Maliki
- Creed: Ash'ari

Muslim leader
- Influenced by: Malik Ibn Anas Abu al-Hasan al-Ash'ari Ibn Rushd al-Jadd Abu Bakr ibn al-Arabi
- Influenced: Averroes Ibn Mada' al-Nawawi

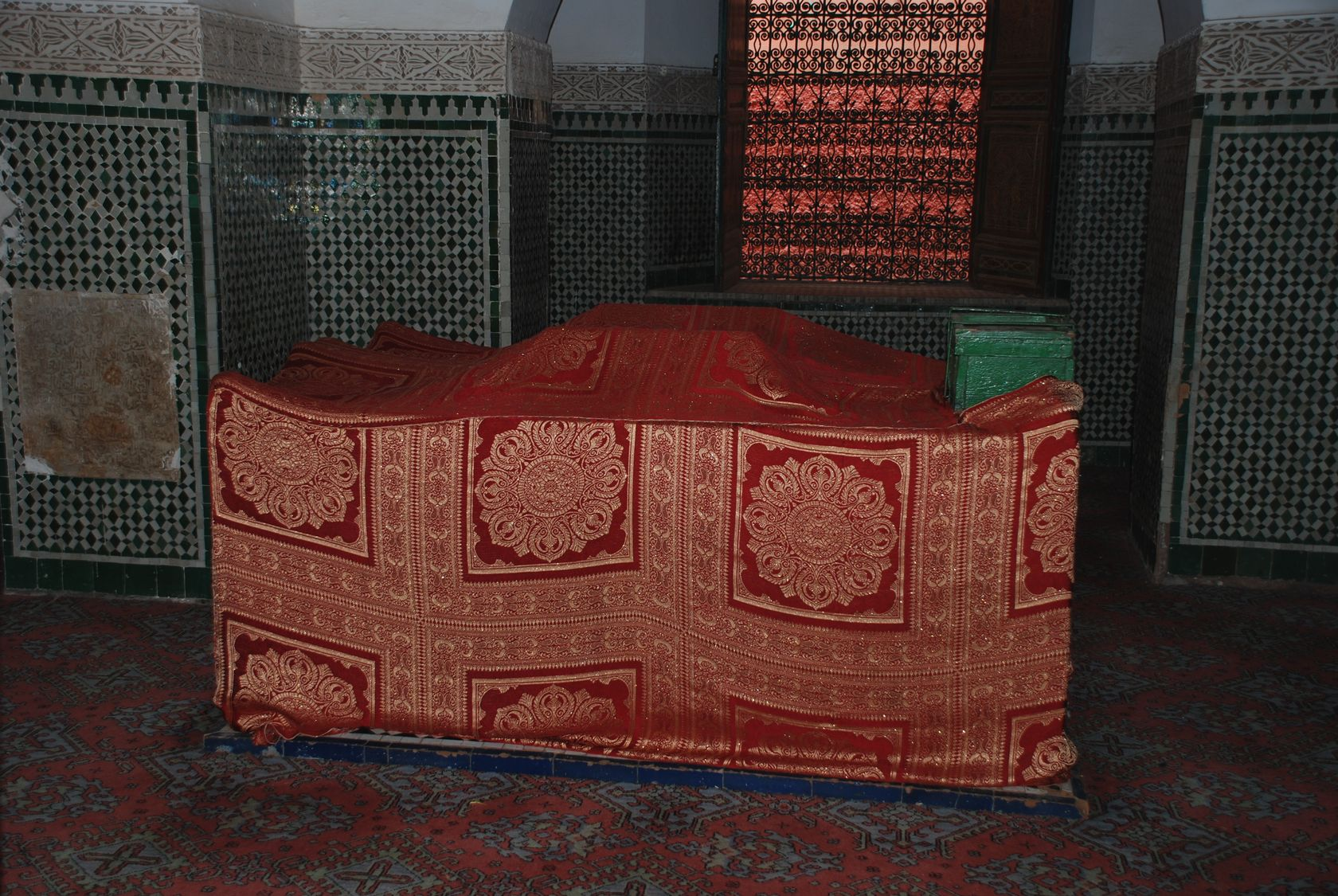
Tomb of Qadi Iyad in Marrakesh

Abū al-Faḍl ʿIyāḍ ibn Mūsā ibn ʿIyāḍ ibn ʿAmr ibn Mūsā ibn ʿIyāḍ ibn Muḥammad ibn ʿAbd Allāh ibn Mūsā ibn ʿIyāḍ al-Yaḥṣubī al-Sabtī (Arabic: أبو الفضل عياض بن موسى بن عياض بن عمرو بن موسى بن عياض بن محمد بن عبد الله بن موسى بن عياض اليحصبي السبتي), better known as Qāḍī Iyāḍ (Arabic: قاضي عياض) (1083–1149), was a Sunni polymath and considered the leading scholar in Maliki fiqh and hadith in his time. In addition, he specialized in theology, legal theory, scriptural exegesis, Arabic language, history, genealogy, and poetry.

== Biography ==
Iyaḍ was born in Ceuta, into an established family of Arab origin. As a scion of a notable scholarly family, ʿIyad was able to learn from the best teachers Ceuta had to offer. The judge Abu ʿAbd Allah Muhammad b. ʿIsa (d. 1111) was ʿIyad's first important teacher and is credited with his basic academic formation. Growing up, ʿIyad benefited from the traffic of scholars from al-Andalus, the Maghrib, and the eastern Islamic world. He became a prestigious scholar in his own right and won the support of the highest levels of society.

In his youth, he was a student of Ibn Khamis al-Yaburi. Later, in his quest for knowledge, Iyad spent part of 1113 and 1114 visiting Cordoba, Murcia, Almeria, and Granada. He received ijāzas from the most important traditionist of his time, Abū ʿAlī al-Ṣadafī (d. 1120) in Murcia, and met with some of the most celebrated scholars of the moment, such as Ibn Rushd (d. 1126), and Ibn Hamdin (d. 1114).

ʿIyad was appointed judge of Ceuta in 1121 and served in the position until 1136. During his tenure as judge of Ceuta he was extremely prolific. Iyad's overall fame as a jurist and as a writer of fiqh (positive law) was based on the work he did in this city. Iyad was also appointed the judge of Grenada where he worked for just over a year. He was a teacher of Averroes and Ibn Maḍāʾ.

He visited Cordoba around January 1137, to be greeted and honoured by its scholars who heard some of his narrations (of Hadith )and acquired some of his knowledge (as reported by Ibn Bashkuwal in his Silah).

He died in 1149. He refused to acknowledge Ibn Tumart as the awaited Mahdi. Sources disagree on how and where he died. Some sources, including one written by his son, Muhammad, describe how he ingratiated himself with the Almohads in Marakech and eventually died of sickness during a military campaign. Other sources describe how he died a natural death while acting as a rural judge near Tadla, while later sources tend to assume a violent death at the hands of the Almohads. Although he was opposed to the Almohads and the ideas of Ibn Hazm, he did not hold enmity for the Zahirite school of Sunni Islam, which the Almohads and Ibn Hazm followed. Ayyad's comments on Ibn Hazm's teacher Abu al-Khiyar al-Zahiri were positive, as was Ayyad's characterization of his own father, a Zahirite theologian.

== Creed ==
Qadi Iyad adhered to the Ash'ari school. He famously defended and highly praised both the founder Abu Hasan al-Ash'ari and his school. Qadi Iyad says:

He (al-Ash'ari) composed the major works for the Ash'ari school and established the proofs for Sunni Islam and established the attributes of God that the people of innovation (Ahl al-Bid'ah) negated. He established the eternity of the speech of God, His will, His hearing. The people of Sunnah (Ahl al-Sunnah) held fast to his books, learned from him, and studied under him. They became intimately familiar with his school of thought, and this school grew in number of students so that they could learn this way of defending the Sunnah and adducing these arguments and proofs to give victory to the faith. In doing this, these students took on his name as well as his students' students so they all became known as Ash'aris. Originally, they were known as the Muthbita (those who make firm), a name given to them by the Mu'tazilites since they affirmed from the Sunnah and the Sharia what the Mu'tazilites negated (ta'til)... Therefore, the people of Sunnah from the East and the West use his (al-Ash'ari) methodology and his arguments, and he has been praised by many as well as his school.

== Influence ==
In doctrine Iyad have influenced later scholars like Ibn Taymiyyah and Taqī ad-Dīn as-Subkī (d.1355) in expanding the definition of heresy in apostasy, being the first to call for the death penalty for those Muslims guilty of “disseminating improprieties about Muḥammad or questioning his authority in all questions of faith and profane life” (according to Tilman Nagel).

Cadi Ayyad University, also known as the University of Marrakech, was named after him. Qadi Ayyad is also well known as one of the seven saints of Marrakech and is buried near Bab Aïlen.

== Works ==
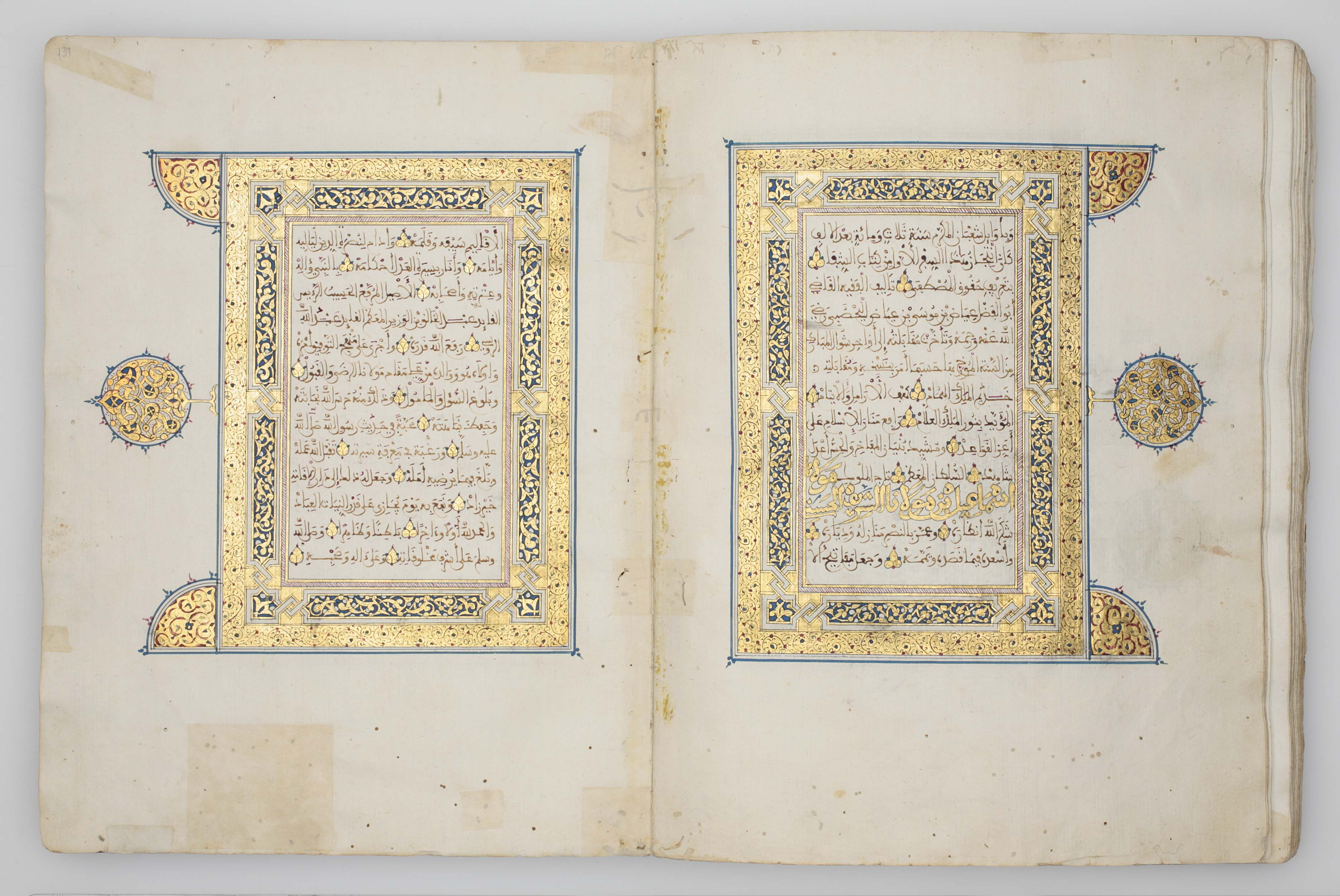
17th century manuscript of the Ash-Shifa copied for the Moroccan ruler Ismail ibn Sharif

Qadi `Iyad's well-known works include:

- Al-Shifa bi Ta'rif Huquq al-Mustafa, about the life and personality of Muhammad
- Tartib al-madarik wa taqrib al-masalik li ma'rifat'alam madhab malik
- Ikmal al-mu`lim bi fawa'id Muslim, a famous commentary on Sahih Muslim which transmitted and expanded upon al-Maziri's own commentary, al-Mu`lim bi-fawa'id Muslim. Qadi `Iyad's own commentary was utilised and expounded upon heavily by Al-Nawawi in his own commentary of Sahih Muslim.
- Bughya al-ra'i lima Tadmanahu Hadith Umm Zara` min al-Fawa'id, published with Tafsir nafs al-Hadith by Al-Suyuti.
- al-I`lam bi Hudud Qawa'id al-Islam, written on the five pillars of Islam.
- al-Ilma` ila Ma`rifa Usul al-Riwaya wa Taqyid al-Sama`, a detailed work on the science of Hadith.
- Mashariq al-Anwar `ala Sahih al-Athar, based on al-Muwatta of Malik ibn Anas, Sahih Al-Bukhari of Imam Bukhari and Sahih Muslim by Muslim ibn al-Hajjaj.
- al-Tanbihat al-Mustanbata `ala al-kutub al-Mudawwana wa al-Mukhtalata.
- Daqa`iq al-akhbar fi dhikr al-janna wa-l-nar, an "eschatological manual" describing the joys of jannah (heaven) and the horrors of jahannam (hell)

== See also ==
- List of Ash'aris

== Bibliography ==
- Dictionnaire historique de l'islam, de Janine Sourdel et Dominique Sourdel, édition PUF.
- Ahmad al Maqqari al Tilimsani, Azhar al Riyad fi Akhbar al Qadi 'Ayyad (biography and works of Qadi Ayyad), 5 volumes
- "Qadi Iyad's Rebellion against the Almohads in Sabtah (A. H. 542–543/A. D. 1147–1148) New Numismatic Evidence", by Hanna E. Kassis, Journal of the American Oriental Society, Vol. 103, No. 3 (July–September, 1983), pp. 504–514
