= Muhammad al-Zurqani =

Sunni Maliki Islamic scholar (1645–1710)

Personal life
- Born: Abu-Abd-Allah Muhammad ibn Abd al-Baqi al-Azhari al-Zurqani al-Maliki; 1645 Egypt
- Died: 1710 (aged 64–65) Egypt
- Era: Colonial era
- Main interest(s): Islamic law, Commentary
- Notable works: Sharh al-Muwatta al-Malik; Sharh al-Mawahib al-Ladunniyyah; Mukhtasar al-maqasid al-hasanah

Religious life
- Religion: Islam
- Denomination: Sunni
- Jurisprudence: Maliki

Muslim leader
- Influenced by: Abd-al-Baqi al-Zurqani

Muhammad al-Zurqani (1645–1710 CE) (Arabic: محمد الزرقاني) was a Sunni Maliki Islamic scholar.

== Name ==
His full name was Imam Abu-Abd-Allah "Ibn Fujlah" Muḥammad ibn ʻAbd al-Bāqī al-Azhari al-Zurqānī al-Maliki.

== Biography ==
He was the son of Abd al-Baqi al-Zurqani and is the annotator of al-Mawahib al-Ladunniyyah, and the commentator on the Muwatta`.

== Works ==
- Sharh al-Muwatta al-Malik (al-Zurqani)
- Sharh al-Mawahib al-Ladunniyyah
- Mukhtaṣar al-maqāṣid al-ḥasanah fī bayān kathīr min al-aḥādīth al-mushtaharah ʻalá al-alsinah/taʾlīf Muḥammad ibn ʻAbd al-Bāqī al-Zurqānī.
- taḥqīq Muḥammad ibn Luṭfī al-Ṣabbāgh.
- commentaries of al-Bayquniyya, Al-Manzumah of al-Baiquni, which was expanded upon by, amongst others, al-Zurqani.

== See also ==
- List of Islamic scholars
- List of Ash'aris and Maturidis
