= Rodolfo Gil Benumeya =

Spanish journalist (1901–1975)

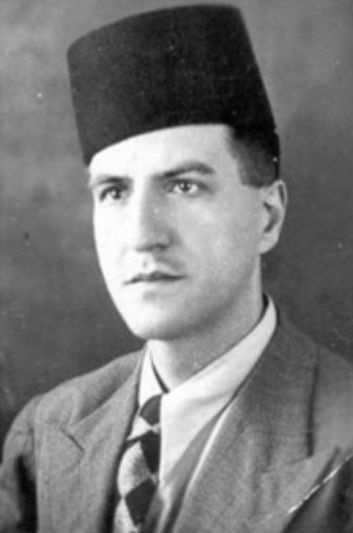
- Born: 5 June 1901; Andújar, Spain
- Died: 31 March 1975 (aged 73); Madrid, Spain

Rodolfo Gil Benumeya (5 June 1901 – 31 March 1975) was a Spanish-Andalusian writer, historian, and Arabist from a Morisco background. He was one of the main proponents of Andalusian nationalism and Moriscoism, which emphasized the cultural differences between Andalusians and the rest of Spain. He dedicated much of his research to the study of Al-Andalus and supported Moroccan nationalism, seeing Morocco and Andalus as one land separated by the Strait of Gibraltar.

== See also ==
- Blas Infante
