= Abu Ishaq al-Fazari =

Abū Ishāq al-Fazārī

Personal life
- Died: 188 H
- Main interest(s): History, Hadith, Fiqh
- Occupation: Islamic Scholar

Religious life
- Religion: Islam
- Denomination: Sunni
- Jurisprudence: Awza'i

Muslim leader
- Influenced by: Abd al-Rahman al-Awza'i

Abū Ishāq al-Fazārī, he was Ibrahīm ibn Muḥammad ibn al-Ḥārith, Abū Isḥāq al-Fazārī, (إبراهيم بن محمد بن الحارث, أبو إسحاق الفزاري) (d. ca. 804), an Islamic historian, traditionalist and jurist of Iraqi descent.

== Life ==
Al-Fazārī received his training first in Kufa, where his ancestors, the Banū Fazāra, originated. He later moved to Baghdad and Damascus, before finally settling in Mopsuestia; at one of the frontier stations to the Byzantine Empire, where he mainly deals with the organization of Islamic foreign and martial law (siyar) according to the teachings of his master al-Awzā'ī. He also acted as legal advisor to Hārūn ar-Rashīd on war-related issues. al-Mizzī, says he studied under more than 80 teachers. In Mopsuestia, whose ribat was expanded at the beginning of the eighth-century and inhabited by Muslim troops, he always had a large circle of pupils. The scholars Ibn 'Asākir and Ibn Hajar al-'Asqalānī report in their biographies that he instructed the Ribatians, taught them the Sunnah and the Enjoining good and forbidding wrong Although a legal theorist, he also served in the military and his participation in a summer campaign in 772 is attested. Ibn Sa'd mentions in his class book that he, like his teacher al-Awzā'ī, was among the scholars who stayed and worked in the Ribats.

== Works ==
- Kitāb as-Siyar كتاب السير; A book on legal issues of war and foreign law, in which al-Fazārī relied primarily on the teachings of al-Auzā'ī and other representatives of the early fiqh. A 9th-century transcript of parchment is held in the Qarawiyyin Library in five parts.

Variant titles exist:

- Kitāb as-siyar fī'l-aḫbār (كتاب السير في الأخبار, ‘The Sira in the Accounts’) begins with a biography of Muḥammad. Fuat Sezgin (1967), p. 292, erroneously cites the book in the chapter "The Prophet's Biography".

The Siyar is one of the oldest extant legal texts on Umayyad legal practice and accounts of the period of their confrontation with the Dār al-Harb. In 1987 the Moroccan researcher Fārūq Ḥammāda published the second, and best preserved, of the five damaged parts. From the remaining manuscript fragments, Ḥammāda lists the legible chapter headings in the appendix. Among the subjects in the Prophetic biography al-Fazārī addresses, insofar as these are discernible, are the military campaigns of Muḥammad, questions on the distribution of spoils, and the treatment of prisoners considered Prophet Sunna, or juridical practitioners of the first generations.

By the mid-10th century in Guadalajara - وادي الحجارة (Wādī al-Hijajra, Wādī 'l-Ḥiǧāra, stony Wadi) - the book was still being consulted as a teaching resource when it came into the possession of the Andalusian scholar Ibn Bashkuwāl (d. 1183) in an already irreproducible condition. Al-Fazārī's legal work was available and at-Tabarī, in his commentary ikhtilāf al-fuqahā', or iḫtilāf al-fuqahā' (اختلاف الفقهاء), ‘The controversial doctrines of the jurists’, contains several references.

== Literature ==
- Ḥammāda, Fārūq, ed. (1987). Kitāb as-siyar li-šaiḫ al-Islām Abī Isḥāq al-Fazārī (introduction). Beirut. pp. 13–86.
- Muranyi, Miklos (1985). "The Kitāb al-Siyar of Abū Isḥāq al-Fazārī (Manuscript of the Qarawiyyīn Library)". Jerusalem Studies in Arabic and Islam (6). Fās: 63ff.
- Sezgin, Fuat (1967). History of Arabic Literature. Vol. 1. Leiden: Brill. p. 292.
