= Ibn al-Faradi =

Andalusian historian

- ابن الفرضي
- Born: 21 December 962; Córdoba, Al-Andalus (now Spain)
- Died: 20 April 1013; Córdoba, Al-Andalus
- Occupations: Historian, Jurist, Scholar of Hadith

Academic work
- Era: Islamic Golden Age
- Main interests: History of Al-Andalus, Religious Scholars
- Notable works: Tarikh ulama al-Andalus
- Influenced: Ibn Hayyan, Ibn 'Abd al-Barr, Ibn Hazm

Abū al-Walīd ‘Abd Allāh ibn Muḥammad ibn Yūsuf ibn Naṣr ibn al-Faraḍī al-Azdī al-Qurṭubī , (21 December 962 – 20 April 1013) best known as Ibn al-Faraḍī, was an Andalusian historian, chiefly known for his Tarikh ulama al-Andalus, a biographical dictionary about religious scholars from al-Andalus. He was a faqīh (jurist) and a muhaddith (scholar of hadith).

== Life ==
Ibn al-Faraḍī began his studies in religious sciences in his native city of Córdoba, and continued them in Toledo, Écija, and Medina-Sidonia. Among his many of his well-known tutors were Ibn Awn Allāh (d. 988), Abū ‘Abd Allāh ibn Mufarrij (d. 990), ‘Abd Allāh ibn Qāsim al-Thagrī (d. 993), and Abū Zakariyya ibn Aidh (d. 985). In the early 990s, he travelled to the East and pursued his studies in Kairouan, Cairo, Mecca and Medina. On his return to al-Andalus, Ibn al-Faradi was appointed as a qadi ("religious judge") in Valencia. He had several pupils, including Ibn Battal, Ibn Hayyan, Ibn 'Abd al-Barr, and Ibn Hazm.

== Death ==
He was killed in Córdoba on 20 April 1013 during the Fitna of al-Andalus.

== Sources ==
- Ávila, María Luisa (2016). "Ibn al-Faraḍī". In Fleet, Kate; Krämer, Gudrun; Matringe, Denis; Nawas, John; Rowson, Everett (eds.). Encyclopaedia of Islam (3rd ed.). Brill Online. doi:10.1163/1573-3912_ei3_COM_30770. ISSN 1873-9830.
- Puente, Cristina de la (2010). "Works on Christian-Muslim relations 900-1050: Ibn al-Faraḍī". In Thomas, David; Mallett, Alex (eds.). Christian-Muslim Relations. A Bibliographical History. Volume 2 (900-1050). BRILL. ISBN 978-9004216181.
- Ayad Khalaf Yousef (November 2022). Anbar university Journal for Islamic Sciences. Vol. 13. University of Anbar. p. 4445.
