= Al-Qastallani =

Islamic scholar

Ahmad ibn Muhammad Al-Qastallani
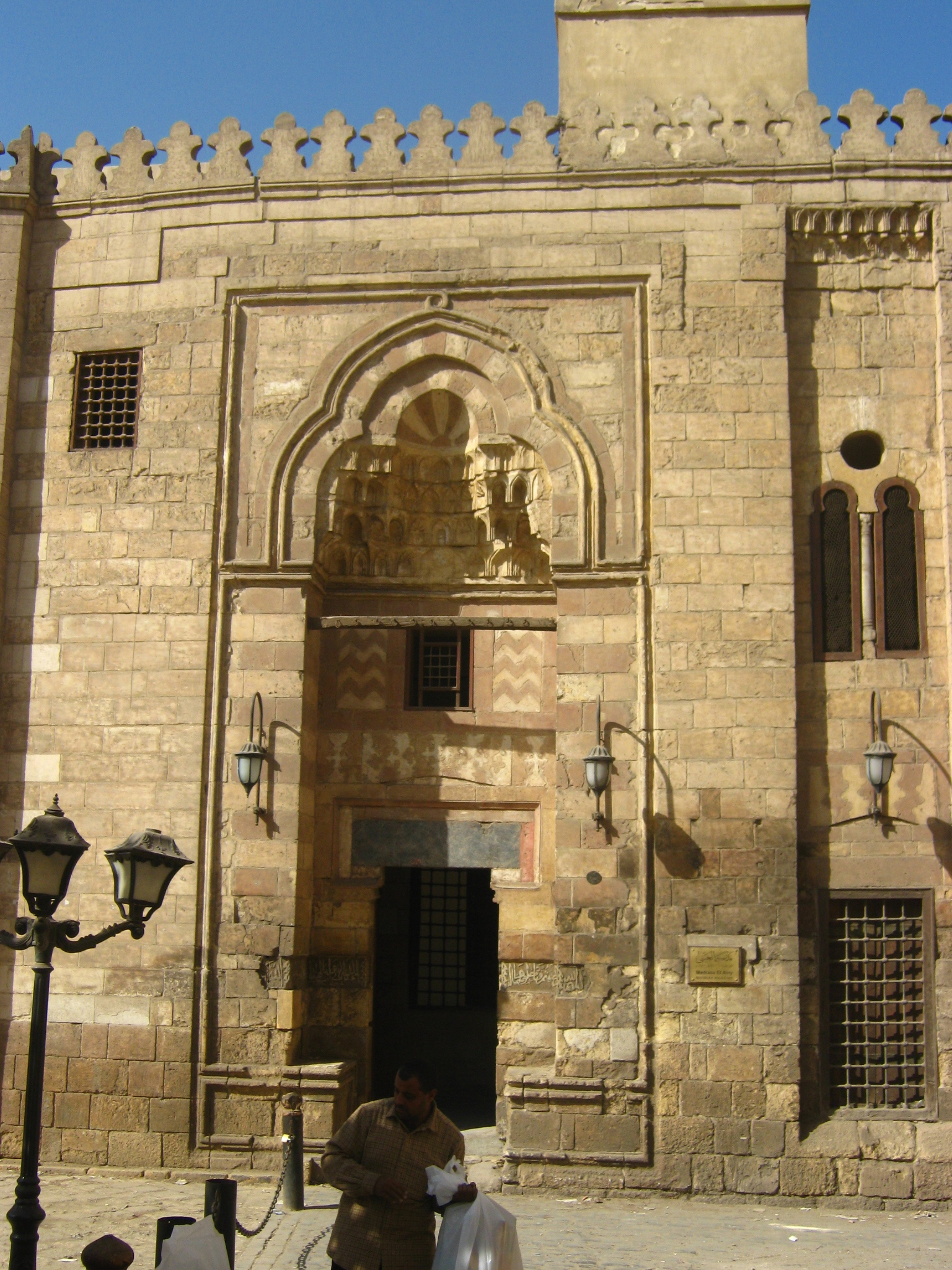
- Madrasah of Al-Ainy, where Al-Qastallani is buried.

Personal life
- Born: 12 Dhu al-Qadah 851 AH / 19 January 1448 CE
- Died: 8 Muharram 923 AH / 31 January 1517 CE
- Cause of death: Stroke
- Resting place: Madrasah of Al-Ainy; 30°2′41″N 31°15′48″E
- Spouse: 'A'isha al-Ba'uniyya
- Era: Medieval era
- Notable work: Irshad al-Sari

Religious life
- Religion: Islam
- Denomination: Sunni
- Jurisprudence: Shafi'i
- Creed: Ash'ari

Aḥmad ibn Muḥammad ibn Abī Bakr ibn ʿAbd al-Malik ibn al-Zayn Aḥmad ibn al-Jamāl Muḥammad ibn al-Ṣafī Muḥammad ibn al-Majd Ḥusayn ibn al-Tāj ʿAlī ibn Maymūn al-Qasṭalānī (Arabic: أحمد بن محمد بن أبي بكر بن عبد الملك بن الزين أحمد بن الجمال محمد بن الصفي محمد بن المجد حسين بن التاج علي بن ميمون القسطلاني), also known as Al-Qasṭallānī, was a Sunni Islamic scholar who specialized in hadith and theology. He owed his literary fame mainly to his exhaustive commentary on the Sahih al-Bukhari entitled Irshād al-Sarī fī Sharḥ al-Bukhārī.

== Lineage ==
There are different opinion about his Nisba. The attribution al-Qastallani may refer to:

- A region in Ifriqiya, present day Tunisia – west of Gafsa
- A town in Andalusia, many genealogists trace it specifically to Tozeur, the most important city of Qastiliya, suggesting that the intended location is in Ifriqiya.

Abbas Al-Madani stated: "There is nothing preventing Qastiliya being the name of both a town and a region, which appears to be the case."

Murtada al-Zabidi, traced the name back to its linguistic meaning, al-Qastallaniya can refer to a rainbow or the redness of twilight in certain times and places. However, the most accepted opinion is that it refers to Qastiliya, a city in Ifriqiya – present-day Tunisia.

== Biography ==
=== Family ===
Al-Qastallani was married to 'Aishah al-Ba'uniyyah, from Damascus. She is described as being a scholar, a literate woman, a sufi poet, and a devout worshipper who authored many works. She came to Cairo in 919 AH (1513 CE) where she was authorized to teach and give fatwas. Al-Qastallani likely married her during her time in Cairo. She died on 16 Dhu al-Qadah 922 AH (11 December 1516 CE) in Damascus, a year before him.

His wife had a son named ‘Abd al-Wahhab, though it is unknown whether he was born with her marriage with Qastallani or not.

=== Argument with Al-Suyuti ===
Al-Suyuti held a grudge against him, accusing him of taking from his books without attributing them. Al-Suyuti brought this complaint before Zakariyya al-Ansari, who ordered Al-Qastallani to respond. Zakariyya listed passages where he had, allegedly, taken from Al-Suyuti's works, and argued that he should have cited Al-Suyuti as the intermediary source.

In an attempt to resolve the tension, Al-Qastallani walked barefoot and bareheaded from Cairo to Al-Suyuti’s house in Al-Rawdah. When he knocked, Al-Suyuti asked, “Who is it?” He replied, “I am Al-Qastallani. I came to you barefoot and bareheaded to reconcile and ease your heart toward me.” Al-Suyuti responded, “My heart is at ease with you,” but he did not open the door or meet him.

=== His illness ===
He suffered from a rare unidentified illness for which doctors could not found any cure.

He described it in his book Al-Mawahib:

“And what I was afflicted with of the base distractions of this lowly world, and the burdens I bore – had they been placed on Mount Radwa, it would have crumbled, had they been placed on Mountains of Thabir, they would humble themselves and crack”

According to his testimony, he was cured in 893 AH (1488 CE). While he was asleep, a man came to him with a piece of paper, upon which it was written: ‘This is a remedy for the illness of Ahmad ibn al-Qastalani from the noble presence, after receiving the noble prophetic permission. When he woke up and, he nothing of what he had been suffering from.

== Works ==
He wrote works in various fields such as Prophetic biography, Qur'anic recitations, Hadith, and Tajwid. Most of them only survive in manuscript form. Following are his works categorized by fields:

=== Works on Qira'ats and Tajwid ===
- Laṭāʾif al-Ishārāt li-Funūn al-Qirāʾāt (لطائف الإشارات لفنون القراءات)
- al-Fatḥ al-Dānī min Kanz Ḥirz al-Amānī (الفتح الداني من كنز حرز الأماني)

A commentary on a poem by al-Shatibi. Al-Ghazzi called it al-Jinī al-Dānī. A manuscript is found in the Great Mosque of Sanaa.

- Nashr al-Nashr fī al-Qirāʾāt al-ʿAshr (نشر النشر في القراءات العش)

A commentary on al-Nashr fī al-Qirāʾāt al-ʿAshr by Ibn al-Jazari. A copy exists in Istanbul.

- Sharḥ Ṭaybat al-Nashr fī al-Qirāʾāt al-ʿAshr (شرح طيبة النشر في القراءات العشر)

Commentary on Ṭaybat al-Nashr by Ibn al-Jazari.

- al-Kanz fī Waqf Ḥamzah wa Hishām ʿala al-Hamz (الكنز في وقف حمزة وهشام على الهمز)

Regarding the Pausing of Ḥamzah and Hishām on the Hamzah. Lost work

- al-Waqf wa al-Ibtidāʾ (الوقف والابتداء)

A manuscript is found at Ṣaddām Manuscript Library, number 37276.

- al-Laʾālī al-Saniyyah fī Sharḥ al-Muqaddimah al-Jazariyyah (اللآلئ السنية في شرح المقدمة الجزرية)

Commentary on al-Muqaddimah al-Jazariyyah by Ibn al-Jazari.

=== Works on Hadith and its Sciences ===
- Irshad al-Sari (إرشاد الساري لشرح صحيح البخاري)

Commentary of Sahih al-Bukhari. This is al-Qastallani's most famous work.

- Ikhtiṣār Irshād al-Sārī (اختصار إرشاد الساري)

Unfinished Abridgement of the previous. Lost work

- Tuhfat al-Sāmiʿ wa al-Qārī bikhitām Ṣaḥīḥ al-Bukhārī (تحفة السامع والقاري بختم صحيح البخاري)

A manuscript of it is located in National Library of Tunisia, number 4587.

- al-Darārī fī Tartīb Abwāb Ṣaḥīḥ al-Bukhārī (الدراري في ترتيب أبواب صحيح البخاري)

A copy exists in al-Mahmudiyya Library, catalog number 2/69

- Minhāj al-Ibtihāj Sharḥ Muslim ibn al-Ḥajjāj (منهاج الابتهاج شرح مسلم بن الحجاج)

Lost work

- Manāhij al-Hidāyah ilā Maʿālim al-Riwāyah (مناهج الهداية إلى معالم الرواية)

Commentary on the book al-Hidāyah by Ibn al-Jazari.

- al-Anwār fī al-Adʿiyah wa al-Adhkār (الأنوار في الأدعية والأذكار)

Lost work

- al-Lawāmiʿ fī al-Adʿiyah wa al-Adhkār al-Jawāmiʿ (اللوامع في الأدعية والأذكار الجوامع)

An abridgment of the previous. Lost work

- Qabas al-Lawāmiʿ (قبس اللوامع)

An abridgment of the previous. A copy is found in the Prophet’s Mosque Library, number 111/80.

- Sharḥ Khuṭbat Ṣaḥīḥ al-Bukhārī (شرح خطبة صحيح البخاري)

Commentary on the Introduction of Sahih al-Bukhari. A copy is found in Juma al-Majid Library, number 246585.

=== Works on the Prophetic Biography ===
- al-Mawāhib al-Laduniyyah bi-al-Minaḥ al-Muḥammadiyyah fī al-Sīrah al-Nabawiyyah (المواهب اللدنية بالمنح المحمدية في السيرة النبوية)
- Ḥāshiyah ʿalā al-Shifāʾ li-al-Qāḍī ʿIyāḍ (حاشية على الشفاء للقاضي عياض)

Lost work

- Mashāriq al-Anwār al-Muḍiyya fī Madḥ Khayr al-Bariyya (مشارق الأنوار المضية في مدح خير البرية)

A commentary on al-Burda.

- Ḥāshiyah ʿalā al-Shamāʾil al-Nabawiyyah li-al-Tirmidhī (حاشية على الشمائل النبوية للترمذي)

Marginal notes on Shama'il al-Muhammadiyya. Also known as Sharḥ al-Shamāʾil. A copy is found in the Khuda Bakhsh Library, manuscript no. 982/1.

- Mawlid al-Nabī مولد النبي ﷺ) ﷺ)

Lost work

- Masālik al-Ḥunafāʾ ilā Mashāriʿ al-Ṣalāh ʿalā al-Nabī al-Muṣṭafā (مسالك الحنفا إلى مشارع الصلاة على النبي المصطفى)

Multiple copies exist, including several at the Egyptian National Library (numbers 1607 and 1580), in Turkey, and at al-Azhar Library.

=== Works on Biographies ===
- al-Rawḍ al-Zāhir fī Manāqib al-Shaykh ʿAbd al-Qādir (الروض الزاهر في مناقب الشيخ عبد القادر)

Virtues of Shaykh ʿAbd al-Qādir. A manuscript is preserved in the Central Library in Jeddah under number 234/6 (Collections).

- Nuzhat al-Abrār fī Manāqib al-Shaykh Abī al-ʿAbbās al-Ḥarrār (نزهة الأبرار في مناقب الشيخ أبي العباس الحرار)
- al-Fatḥ al-Mawāhibī fī Manāqib al-Imām al-Shāṭibī (الفتح المواهبي في مناقب الإمام الشاطبي)

A biographical work on Abū al-Qāsim al-Shāṭibī.

- Minḥah min Minaḥ al-Fatḥ al-Mawāhibī (منحة من منح الفتح المواهبي)
- al-Nūr al-Sāṭiʿ fī Mukhtaṣar al-Ḍawʾ al-Lāmiʿ li-al-Sakhāwī (النور الساطع في مختصر الضوء اللامع للسخاوي)

Multiple copies are held at the Islamic University and al-Ḥusayniyyah Treasury in Morocco, number 5460.

=== Works on Jurisprudence ===
- al-Isʿād fī Talkhīṣ al-Irshād (الإسعاد في تلخيص الإرشاد)

Lost work

- al-Asʿad fī Talkhīṣ al-Irshād min Furūʿ al-Shāfiʿiyyah li-Sharaf al-Dīn al-Maqrī (الأسعد في تلخيص الإرشاد من فروع الشافعية لشرف الدين المقري)

Lost work

- Madārik al-Marām fī Masālik al-Ṣiyām (مدارك المرام في مسالك الصيام)

Manuscripts are found at the Egyptian National Library (no. 508, Majāmīʿ collection) and Al-Azhar Library (no. 395 Bakhīt / 45921).

- Marāṣid al-Ṣalāt fī Maqāṣid al-Ṣalāh (مراصد الصلات في مقاصد الصلاة)

A manuscript exists in the Egyptian National Library, no. 508 (Majāmīʿ Collection).

=== Works on Preaching and Admonition ===
- Imtiʿāʿ al-Samʿ wa al-Abṣār (إمتاع السمع والأبصار)

Lost work

- Zahr al-Riyāḍ wa Shifāʾ al-Qulūb al-Marāḍ (زهر الرياض وشفاء القلوب المراض)

A manuscript exists in the Alexandria Library under the category of Mawāʿiẓ (Sermons), no. 20.

- Maqāmāt al-ʿĀrifīn (مقامات العارفين)

A copy is found in the Köprülü Library, manuscript no. 784.

- Nafāʾis al-Anfās fī al-Ṣuḥbah wa al-Libās (نفائس الأنفاس في الصحبة واللباس)

Lost work

- Yaqẓat Dhawī al-Iʿtibār fī Mawʿiẓat Ahl al-Iʿtibār (يقظة ذوي الاعتبار في موعظة أهل الاعتبار)

Lost work

=== Scientific Works ===
- Risālah fī al-Rubʿ al-Mujīb (رسالة في الربع المجيب)

A Treatise on Quadrant. A manuscript is found at the Juma Al-Majid Library, no. 259697 (Astronomy Section).

=== Literary Works ===
- Mukhammasāt (مخمسات)

Quintains (Five-Line Stanza Poems). A manuscript is found in Leiden Library.

== Death ==
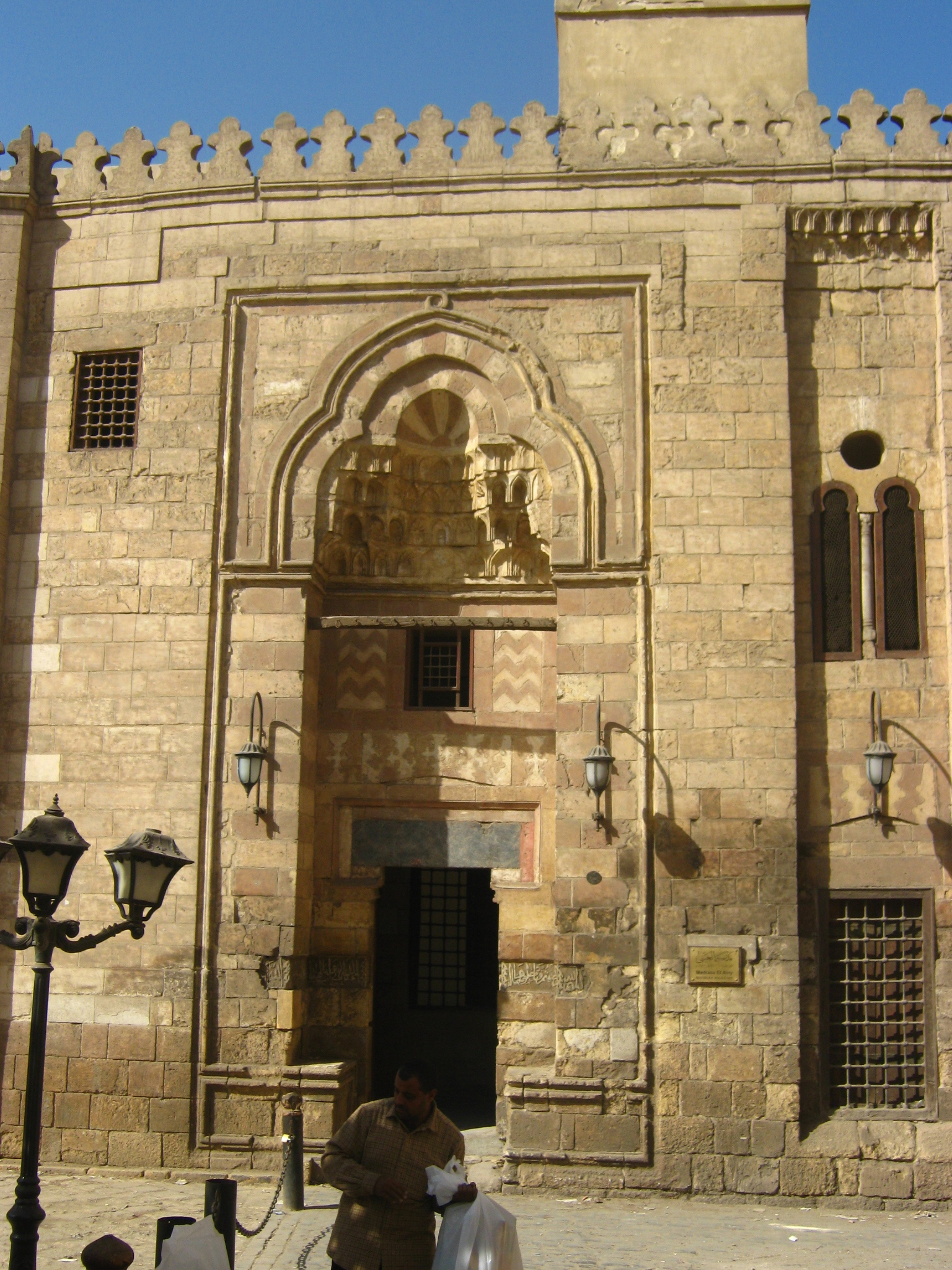
Madrasah of Al-Ainy, where Al-Qastallani is buried. 30°2′41″N 31°15′48″E

He died in Cairo on the night, the 8th of Muharram in the year 923 AH (31 January 1517 CE). His death was due to a stroke that occurred after he was deeply affected upon hearing the news of the beheading of Ibrahim ibn ‘Ata’ Allah al-Makki, a friend of Sultan al-Ghawri. He fainted and fell from his mount upon hearing the news. He was carried to his home, where he died a few days later.

The people carried his coffin and performed the funeral prayer for him at Al-Azhar Mosque after Friday prayer. He was buried in Madrasa of al-Ainy of Badr al-Din al-‘Ayni near Al-Azhar mosque. His death caused great sorrow among the people.

The scholars of Damascus prayed the absentee funeral prayer for him when they received news of his death. The day of his death coincided with Sultan Selim’s forceful entry into Egypt and his takeover of the country in Ottoman–Mamluk War.

== See also ==
- List of Ash'aris and Maturidis
