= Ibn Wahb =

Egyptian jurist of the Maliki school

Personal life
- Born: 743 CE (125 AH); Fustat, Egypt
- Died: 813 CE (197 AH); Egypt
- Era: Abbasid Caliphate
- Region: Medina and Egypt
- Main interest(s): Fiqh, Hadith

Religious life
- Religion: Islam
- Jurisprudence: Maliki

Muslim leader
- Influenced: Sahnun

Abu Muhammad Abdallah ibn Wahb ibn Muslim al-Fihri al-Qurashi al-Misri(743 – 813 CE) (125 – 197 AH ), better known as Ibn Wahb (not to be confused with Ibn Wahb al-Kātib) was an important Egyptian early jurist in the Maliki school. He was one of Malik's best known companions and had a tremendous influence in spreading the Maliki school in Egypt and the Maghreb.

== Life ==
He was born at Old Cairo in Dhu al-Qi‘dah in the year 125 AH (743 CE). He was a member, by adoption, of the tribe of Quraysh: a native of Egypt, was a mawla to Rehana, who was herself a mawla to Abu Abd ArRahman Yazid Ibn Unais, of the tribe of Fihr. He received his early training in the Islamic sciences under the tutelage of the Egyptian scholar Uthman ibn Abd al-Hakam al-Judhami (d. 779), and travelled thereupon to Medina to study with Malik ibn Anas. He stayed with Malik for about twenty years, and disseminated his fiqh in Egypt. He studied not only with Malik but also with many of the companions of Ibn Shihab al-Zuhri. Ibn Wahb took from more than four hundred shaykhs of hadith in Egypt, the Hijaz and Iraq, including Sufyan al-Thawri, Ibn 'Uyaynah, Ibn Jurayj, 'Abdu'r-Rahman ibn Ziyad al-Ifriqi, Sa'id ibn Abi Ayyub and others. Many also related hadiths from him.

Ibn Wahb has a high standing in the Maliki school as he was one of Malik's first and most prominent companions. Al-Asbagh, one of the students of Malik's companions said of him, "Ibn Wahb was the companion of Malik with the most knowledge of the Sunnah and traditions although he related from men who were weak". Ibn Wahb himself recognised that some of his hadiths were weak. He said, "if it had not been that Allah rescued me through Malik and al-Layth, I would have been lost. I knew many hadiths, and that confused me. I used to present them to Malik and al-Layth and they would say, 'Take this and leave that'".

Malik esteemed and loved Ibn Wahb. He did not spare any of his companions criticism except for Ibn Wahb. Malik used to call him "the faqih" when he wrote to him. Ibn Wahb was one of those who spread Malik's school in Egypt and the Maghreb. People travelled to him to learn Malik's fiqh both during Malik's lifetime and after his death. He left many excellent books, including what he heard from Malik which took up about 30 volumes. He died on 24th of Sha‘ban in the year 197 AH (813 CE).
