= Sahnun =

Islamic jurist of the Abbasid era

Sahnun ibn Said ibn Habib al-Tanukhi

Personal life
- Born: 776–7 CE (160 AH)
- Died: 854–5 CE (240 AH)
- Era: Islamic golden age (Abbasid era)
- Main interest(s): Hadith and Fiqh
- Notable work: Al-Mudawwana

Religious life
- Religion: Islam
- Denomination: Sunni
- Jurisprudence: Maliki

Sahnun ibn Said ibn Habib al-Tanukhi (Arabic: سحنون بن سعيد بن حبيب التنوخي) (c. 776/77 – 854/55) (160 AH – 240 AH ) was a jurist in the Maliki school from Qayrawan in modern-day Tunisia.

== Biography ==
His full name was Abu Said Abd al-Salam ibn Said ibn Habib ibn Hassan ibn Hilal ibn Bakkar ibn Rabia al-Tanukhi (أَبُو سَعِيدٍ عَبْدِ السَّلَامِ بْنُ سَعِيدِ بْنِ حَبِيبِ بْنِ حَسَّانَ بْنِ هِلَالِ بْنِ بَكَّارِ بْنِ رَبِيعَةَ التَّنُوخِيُّ). He gained the nickname Saḥnūn (a type of sharp bird) because of his quickness of mind. He was born to an Arab family that originated in Syria, his father was a soldier from Homs in present-day Syria. He was from the tribe of Tanukh.

In his youth Sahnun studied under the scholars of Qayrawan and Tunis. In particular, he learned from the Tripolitanian scholar `Ali bin Ziyad, who had learned from Imam Malik. In 178 AH he traveled to Egypt to study under other pupils of Malik, who died before Sahnun had the financial means to reach them. Later on he continued to Medina and studied under other prominent scholars, returning to North Africa in 191 AH.

Upon accepting the appointment as a jurist, he was said to have told his daughter Khadija, "Today your father has been slain without a knife." He was known to be scrupulous in his judgments and courteous towards litigants and witnesses, but strict towards the men surrounding the emir; he refused to allow them to send representatives on their behalf in litigation, and refused a request from the emir not to interfere in their illegal ventures.

Sahnun's son Muhammad ibn Sahnun (d. 256/870) was also a noted jurist, composing the collection of nawāzil entitled Nawāzil al-ṣalāt min Dīwān Muḥammad ibn Saḥnūn.

== Theological Views ==
Sahnun was known for his strong orthodoxy, even to the point of refusing to pray behind a Mu'tazilite imam. He excluded heretical sects from the mosque, including the Ibadi, Mu'tazilites and others. The Encyclopedia of Islam states:

Hitherto, in the multiple circles of scholarship, representatives of all tendencies were able to express themselves freely in the Great Mosque of Kairouan. In a process amounting to a purging of the community of scholars there, Sahnun put an end to this "scandal". He dispersed the sects of the ahl al-bida; the leaders of heretical sects were paraded ignominiously, and some were compelled to recant in public. Sahnun was one of the greatest architects of the exclusive supremacy of Sunnism in its Maliki form throughout the Muslim West.
