= Pre-Islamic Arabic poetry =

Arabic poetry composed between 540 and 620 AD

Pre-Islamic Arabic poetry, known in Arabic literature as al-shi'r al-Jahili ("poetry from the Jahiliyyah", i.e. from the pre-Islamic period), was composed in Arabia roughly between 540 and 620 AD, the period of late antique Arabia. This poetry largely originated in the Najd (then a region east of the Hejaz and up to present-day Iraq), with only a minority coming from the Hejaz. Poetry was first distinguished into the Islamic and pre-Islamic by Hammad al-Rawiya (d. 772). In Abbasid times, literary critics debated if contemporary or pre-Islamic poetry was the better of the two.

Pre-Islamic poetry constitutes a major source for the classical Arabic language both in grammar and vocabulary, and as a record of the political and cultural life of the time in which it was created. A number of major poets are known from pre-Islamic times, the most prominent among them being Imru' al-Qais. Other prominent poets included Umayya ibn Abi as-Salt, al-Nabigha, and Zayd ibn Amr. The poets themselves did not write down their works: instead, it was orally transmitted and eventually codified into poetry collections by authors in later periods, beginning in the eighth century. Collections may focus on the works of a single author (such a collection is called a diwan) or multiple authors (an anthology).

The emergence of these collections of pre-Islamic poetry was driven by three stages of expertise: that of the poet, the transmitter, and the scholar. Each was a distinct profession, though the same individual could participate in two or all three. The poet (sha'ir) creates the poetry and commits it to memory. The transmitters (ruwat) take charge in its memorization and preservation, generally in a tribally affiliated manner. The scholars (or collectors) collect poetry across their sources into a single, written collection that can be copied and read. Scholarship in poetry (al-'ilm bi'l shi'r) emerged as a distinct discipline around the end of the eighth century, and most of its participants were mawali (offspring of non-Arab converts to Islam) engaged in the royal courts of the empire. Historically, experts in each domain of this process claimed authority over preservation which, in turn, functioned as a claim to authority over the representation of the past, and the poetry was the vehicle by which the pre-Islamic past was understood.

== Origins and context ==
The earliest evidence for pre-Islamic poetry comes from ancient inscriptions. The Hymn of Qāniya is a twenty-seven line poem known from a first century rock, addressed to the god Shams. The earliest figures to whom poetry is attributed to in Islamic tradition are the Tanukhids and Lakhmids in the third century. Greek sources attribute poems to Arabs as early as the fourth century.

Many sources provide a context for pre-Islamic poetry. Pre-Islamic Arabic and Greek poetry share some similar themes, such as the inescapability of death and the notion of self-immortalization through the accomplishment of heroic deeds in battle. Recent scholarship has identified that pre-Islamic poetry, to a degree, experienced Hellenization and that it offers strong evidence for the integration of Arabia into the broader Mediterranean culture during Late Antiquity. Another context may be the genre of Arabic literature called the Days of the Arabs, recounting some of the wars in pre-Islamic Arabia that give the setting for some of those same heroic deeds on the battlefield.

== Genres and themes ==
The central genres or motifs of pre-Islamic poetry included:

lamentation before the ruins of the camps (al-bukāʾ ʿalā l-aṭlāl), erotic prelude (nasīb), description of the poet's journey (raḥīl), description of animals and nature (waṣf), panegyric (madīḥ), self-exaltation (fakhr), invectives (hijāʾ), and eulogies (rithāʾ)

These motifs could be combined to produce well-known genres of pre-Islamic poetry, one example being the qasida. The qasida occurs in three parts, each corresponding to one of these motifs, and these motifs are arranged into the following order: the desert motif (nasīb), description of a camel or a horse (raḥīl), and finally the tribal boast or similar (the fakhr).

== Ethics ==
Pre-Islamic values have historically been inferred from pre-Islamic poetry, although historians doubt that the values of this poetry represented the values of society more broadly. The themes of Jahili poetry emphasize a heroic value system where the enjoyment of wine, amorous adventures, and fighting came together, as can be seen in the muʿallaqa of Ṭarafa:

If you can't avert from me the fate that surely awaits me / then pray leave me to hasten it on with what money I've got. / But for three things, that are the joy of a young fellow / I assure you I wouldn't care when my deathbed visitors arrive— / first, to forestall my charming critics with a good swig of crimson wine / that foams when the water is mingled in; / second, to wheel at the call of the beleaguered a curved-shanked steed / streaking like the wolf of the thicket you've startled lapping the water; / and third, to curtail the day of showers, such an admirable season / dallying with a ripe wench under the pole-propped tent, / her anklets and her bracelets seemingly hung on the boughs / of a pliant, unriven gum-tree or a castor-shrub.

According to Pamela Klasova, the values expressed should not be seen as "values in themselves". That is, they are values invoked by the poet as a vehicle for the expression of the heroic refusal of the poet to surrender themselves to the power of unpredictable fate. When wine, fighting, and so forth are celebrated, these are acts of defiance against death. For the poet, death can come at any moment, and so the poet hastens death by behaving in a manner that is unrestrained. This perception of the world extends to other areas of the life of the poet, and so he acts with extreme generosity to others, even at the risk of the endangerment of one's own life. After all, the poet sees death as inevitable and the only form of immortality achievable is through the memory of oneself after their death. This memory is perpetuated by the performance of heroic and honorable deeds. Wars were opportunities for one to set themselves apart from others by demonstrating their courage and achieving glory. Thus, poetry portrays war as something that occurs not merely out of necessity and material gain but also "for the noble strife itself". Poetry centred the present, but in a manner that was motivated by a deeper existential framework as opposed to barbarism. Tradition depicted the poets as pagan, but the poetry itself lacks concern for religion.

Pre-Islamic poetry is not representative of the values of pre-Islamic Arabia (and likely was an expression of one cultural model among nomads and/or seminomads), but it came to be depicted in this way likely for two reasons: the scarcity of other pre-Islamic sources to have survived into the Islamic era, and deliberate reconstructions of the "Jahiliyyah".

== Poets ==
=== Social role ===
In pre-Islamic Arabian society, the poets (al-shuʿarāʾ) were charged with the task of perpetuating the legacy of their tribe and transmitting knowledge of the past. Members of tribes and primeval ancestors had their deeds recorded in stories and tales, memories of confrontations between the tribes and times of distress were recounted, and the genealogy of the tribe was maintained. The positive qualities of the tribe, such as their heroism and genealogy, was coded into their poetry. One generation would listen to and recite the odes of the earlier one, allowing for the tribe to maintain trust in their poems as records of earlier times. In this process, the poetry was thought to be stamped into the collective memory of the tribe. This process allows the poets themselves to be the creators and shapers of how the past what was happening was expressed, and it also allowed them to convey their agendas through their art. Poets played roles in diplomatic arbitration, conflict resolution, and intermediating in ransom of hostages. The relative worth of a poet was conveyed by their wages and the opinions of them by more experienced poets. This practice was thought to last until the Umayyad era, when some poets disassociated from their tribal framework and entered the royal court of the caliph. In this context, new functions and modes of dialectics for poets emerged and earlier ones shifted. It was also in this time that the authority of poets as conveyors of the past began to deteriorate in favor of other types of experts, such as hadith transmitters.

=== Famous poets ===
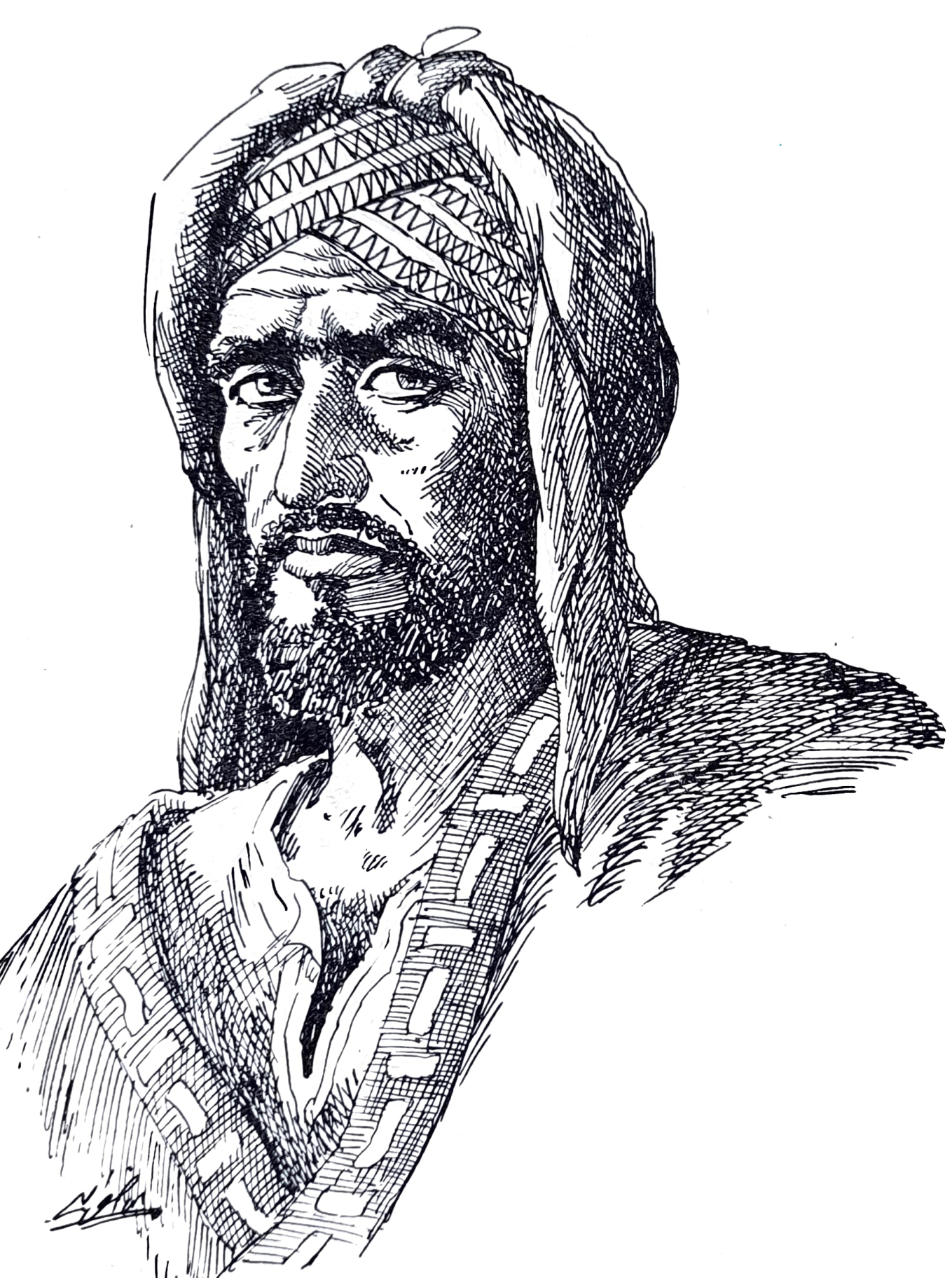
1968 sketch of Imru' al-Qais

Among the most famous poets of the pre-Islamic era are Imru' al-Qais, Samaw'al ibn 'Adiya, al-Nabigha, Tarafa, Zuhayr bin Abi Sulma, and Antarah ibn Shaddad. Other poets, such as Ta'abbata Sharran, al-Shanfara, Urwa ibn al-Ward, were known as su'luk or vagabond poets, much of whose works consisted of attacks on the rigidity of tribal life and praise of solitude.

Although few in number, some poets were Jewish or Christian. On the other hand, most poets expressed a gentile monotheism or henotheism that elevated Allah as the supreme being and Creator of the world.

=== Imru' al-Qais ===
Imru' al-Qais was a poet of the first half of the sixth century AD. Today, he is one of the most famous and celebrated Arabic poets, with some viewing him as the very best (though this was a matter of debate). He was widely known by the title "the prince of the poets in the Era of Ignorance" (amīru l-shuʿarāʾ fi-l-jāhiliyya).

Contemporary sources for Imru' are lacking and biographical information about him from 9th and 10th century sources were shaped by heroic narrative conventions. His name, "Imru' al-Qais," means "Worshiper of the Qays" referring either to a deity called Qays or an attribute of the goddess Manat. Most sources identify his father as Ḥujr ibn al-Ḥārith, who became the king of the Kinda tribe in 528 AD, shortly after Imru' was born. According to his work, he adopted a lifestyle of poetry, wine, and women; he strayed from the conventional morality of the court which led to his expulsion. He lives a wandering life until he learns of his father's death at the hands of the Asad tribe. This effectively transforms him into a warrior, and he raises the support of several other tribes in order to take vengeance. He failed to get such support. He sought to regain momentum by appealing to the Byzantine court. Unsuccessful in that, he dies soon thereafter. The poetry of Imru' al-Qais was collected in the late eighth century in Iraq. The authenticity of it is disputed, with al-Asma'i believing that his vagabond group as he wandered in the aftermath of his expulsion composed much of what is attributed to him. Some of his poetry is widely agreed upon as genuine however, including his contribution to the Mu'allaqat.

=== Jewish poets ===
Islamic compilations of pre-Islamic poetry occasionally mention Jewish poets, although it is difficult to assess their authenticity and, compared to epigraphs, are more difficult to date and are subject to later influences of Islamicization. The Ṭabaqāt fuḥūl al-shuʿarā ("The generations of the most outstanding poets"), composed by the Basran traditionalist and philologist Muḥummad ibn Sallām al-Jumaḥī (d. 846), records a list of Jewish poets. The Arabian/Arab antiquities collector Abū l-Faraj al-Iṣfahānī (d. 976) also has scattered reference to eleven Jewish poets in his Kitāb al-agānī ("Book of Songs"). The poets they refer to are as follows, followed by (J) if mentioned by al-Jumahi and (I) if they are mentioned by al-Isfahani:

- Samaw'al ibn 'Adiya (J) (I)
- Al-Rabi ibn Abu al-Huqayq (J) (I)
- Ka‘b ibn al-Ashraf (J) (I)
- Shurayḥ ibn ʿImrān (J) (I)
- Saʿya (Shuʿba) ibn Gharīḍ/ʿArīḍ (J) (I)
- Abū Qays ibn Rifāʿa (J) (I)
- Dirham ibn Zayd (J)
- Abū l-Dhayyāl (J) (I)
- Sarah of Qurayẓa (I)
- Kaʿb ibn Saʿd of Qurayẓa (I)
- Aws ibn Danī of Qurayẓa (I)

The poetry ascribed to these figures rarely make reference to precise historical details or religious expressions, although some poems ascribed to al-Samaw'al in the Asma'iyyat collection are explicitly religious. In addition, al-Jumahi offers very little by way of biography for each of these figures other than to recount popular anecdotes that a few are associated with. Al-Isfahani gives more detailed biographical information. For example, he says Al-Samaw’al ibn ‘Ādiyā was a native of Tayma (in northwestern Arabia) whose father had ties to the Ghassanids. He lived in a family home often called a castle and whose name was al-Ablaq. Popular stories described his fidelity and loyalty, such as one where he refuses the surrender of the possessions of Imru' al-Qais to Imru's enemies despite their attempt to besiege his castle. Asides from Samaw'al, the only other Jewish poet to earn some renown was al-Rabī‘ ibn Abī l-Ḥuqayq, chief of the Naḍir tribe. The earliest sources make no mention of this figure, but only his son Kināna. Instead, it is only with the work of al-Isfahani that the exploits of al-Rabī‘ are described.

The poet Al-Aswad ibn Ya'fur references Jewish written material, when he wrote: "the letters of two Jews from Taymāʾ or the people of Madyan on their parchments which they recite with accomplishment".

=== Christian poets ===
Historians have debated how widespread Christianity was among the pre-Islamic poets, with views ranging from there being very few, to very many, Christians. One explicit Christian verse has been attributed to a certain 'Amr ibn 'Abd al-Ǧinn al-Tanūḫi:

I swear by what the priests sanctify in all those sacristies, By the chief monk (abīl al‐abīliyyīn), by Jesus son of Mary!

One famous member of the Christian community of Najran, and a bishop, was Quss Ibn Sa'ida al-Iyadi. According to Islamic tradition, he was a famed poet, noted for his excellence, and Muhammad was said to have listened to his sermons in the market-place of Ukaz near Mecca. One of his sermons has survived.

Adi ibn Zayd was a prominent Christian Arab poet, stationed in al-Hira. One line of his work, from a particularly famous and lengthy poem, involves swearing by "the lord of Mecca and of the cross": thus, Abi ibn Zayd understood God to be the protector of both Mecca and Christianity. In the poem, he continues to compare himself to a monk based on the manner that he conducts his prayers. Adi ibn Zayd also composed a poem on the creation of the world. Imruʾ al-Qais once mentions Christian writings, when he said, "like a line of writing in the books of monks".

Al-A'sha refers to God as al-ilāh, a possibly connected the poet with a Christian affiliation. In one poem, he refers to swears by "the lord of those who prostrate themselves in the evening", which might be a reference to Christian prayers. However, despite the implicit monotheism, there is no explicit identification (neither by himself nor by others) of al-A'sha as a Christian.

Al-Nabigha, whose own religious convictions are unclear, praises his patrons (the Ghassanids) as pious Christians. When he was trying to regain the favor of the king, he wrote a poem that likened the leadership of the king with that of Solomon.

== Transmission of poetry ==
Alongside the poets were the transmitters (ruwāt) appointed with the preservation of the tribes poetry. The transmitter was a distinct profession from the poet. Little information is known about transmitters, as Arabic sources refer to them anonymously and collectively; for example, "the transmitters of the tribe Ṭāyʾ" (ruwāt Ṭāyʾ) or "the Arab or Bedouin transmitters" (ruwāt al-ʿarab). Occasional names of transmitters may appear but without corresponding biographical information. Though these were distinct professions, many individuals held both a status of poet and transmitter. Transmitters not only transmitted poems, but also revised and interpolated them. According to Khalaf al-Aḥmar (d. 796 CE), "even in antiquity, the transmitters revised the poetry of poets".

According to Nathaniel Miller, the early corpus of surviving poetry underwent a number of semi-independent lines or strains of transmission: musical, exegetical, historiographical, lexicographical, and philological. All of them drew on a common pool of Umayyad poetry, and each one also drew on their own independent sources of poetry. Hejazi poetry was especially utilized for musical purposes, as shown by the Kitab al-Aghani of Abu al-Faraj al-Isfahani (d. 972). However, musical poetry suffers from a disinterest in preservation, verification, and attribution by its mode of transmission. Its place in Iraqi court culture also makes earlier poetry difficult to distinguish from later additions. Exegetical poetry, such as that in Al-Tabari's Jāmiʿ al-bayān, is usually not corroborated by diwans (collections of the poetry of a single author). It is likely that exegetical poetry drew both on forged and early materials. The poetry found in chronicles is usually patently inauthentic.

In the mid-8th century, a number of seminal transmitters are named, including Ḥammād al-Rāwiyah (d. ca. 772), Khalaf al-Aḥmar (d. ca. 796), and Abū ʿAmr ibn al-ʿAlāʾ (d. 771 or 774).

== Collections ==
=== Sources of poems ===
The first extant written collection of poetry containing pre-Islamic works was by al-Mufaddal ad-Dabbi (d. after 780 AD). His collection included 126 poems, usually involving one or two poems per poet, and was attributed to a number of early Islamic and pre-Islamic figures. 67 poets are represented, only 6 of whom are thought to have been born Muslim. 78 of the poems (or 62%) are from Najdi/Iraqi tribes. Another 28% were technically from technically Najdi tribes but in cultural contact with the Hejaz. Only 13 (10%) are from the southern Hejaz, with 2 from the Quraysh (who were ultimately not a poetically significant group in this period, though their status as-such would be inflated later). His collection came to be known as the Mufaḍḍaliyyāt and appears to have been composed as a pedagogical text for the Abbasid family. The second major extant collection to be made was the Asma'iyyat, by the grammarian al-Asma'i (d. 828). 69% of his poems are Najdi, 17% southern Hijazi, and 11% Yemeni. Both these figures were members of the Najdi tribe. Both authors wrote numerous other works across a wide range of subjects, including lexicography, phonetics, Arabian topography, and more.

=== List of major collections ===
The five major collections of pre-Islamic Arabic poetry were made in the 8th and 9th centuries and are, alongside published editions and translations:

- The Mu'allaqat ("The Suspended Odes" or "The Hanging Poems"), a group of seven long poems collected in the 8th century. It may have been collected by Hammad Ar-Rawiya.
  - Arberry, The Seven Odes: The First Chapter in Arabic Literature, Routledge, 1957. Available
  - Johnson, Frank (ed.). The Seven Poems Suspended in the Temple at Mecca, Education Society's Steam Press, 1893. Available.
  - King Fahad National Library, The Mu'allaqat for Millennials: Pre-Islamic Arabic Golden Odes, King Abdullazizz Center For World Culture, 2020. Available.
- The Mufaddaliyat ("The Examination of al-Mufaḍḍal"), a group of 126 poems collected by Al-Mufaddal ad-Dabbi in the 8th century.
  - Lyall, Charles James (ed.), The Mufaddaliyat, Clarendon University Press, 1918. Available.
- The Jamharat Ash'ar al-Arab ("The Gathering of the Arabs' Verses"), collected between the 8th and 10th centuries.
- The Asma'iyyat, a collection of 92 poems.
  - Lambden, Stephen. "The Kitab al-asma' II - Select Excerpts in Translation." Available.
- The Kitab al-Hamasah, a ten-book anthology of 884 Arabic poems compiled in the 9th century by Abu Tammam.

== Authenticity ==
=== Criticisms by Margoliouth and Taha Husayn ===
Initial rejection of the authenticity of the corpus of pre-Islamic poetry came in the early 20th century, from a paper by D.S. Margoliouth in 1925 and the book On Pre-Islamic Poetry by Taha Husayn in 1926. Use of pre-Islamic poetry in the field of Quranic studies also declined compared to earlier eras after the skeptical turn of the field in the 1970s, a trend lamented by a number of relevant experts. Most work from previous decades is now obsolete, however. Margoliouth argued the monotheism of the poetry was out of place, but archaeological findings have since shown monotheism was widespread in pre-Islamic Arabia, contrary to later representations. Margoliouth also relied on the assumption that authentic pre-Islamic poetry would need to share the dialect of the Quran, which is no longer accepted.

=== Recent trends ===
Early responses to sweeping rejections of the authenticity of pre-Islamic poetry came from Arafat and, in recent decades, historians have retreated from blanket skepticism of these poems, viewing the majority of as potentially pre-Islamic in origin. However, the authenticity of poetry was dependent on the circles in which it was transmitted and the genres of literature it appeared in. Whereas the poetry in diwans transmitted by philologists is usually reliable, the poetry found in tafsir (Quranic exegesis) and historical chronicles is usually unreliable. Poetry attributed to certain individuals could also be unreliable, like the poetry of Umayya ibn abi as-Salt. As such, pre-Islamic poetry cannot be blindly trusted.

Many discoveries were involved in showing that pre-Islamic poetry could be potentially authentic. One study of the toponyms in pre-Islamic poetry suggest they refer to real places though unknown in later periods, indicating an origin in periods at least a few generations prior to compilation. Archaic grammatical forms indicate written transmission of the poetry by at least the 1st century AH. The archaic ethnonym Ma'add, despite its absence past the Umayyad period (replaced by the word "Arab") is widespread in the poetry and semantically overlaps with uses of the same term in pre-Islamic inscriptions. Another investigation suggests general authenticity with respect to its treatment of Hajj rites. Hajj references in pre-Islamic poetry are few, especially in comparison to in Muslim-era poetry, and concentrated in poets living in and near Mecca but largely absent from the poetry of authors from northern and eastern Arabia, contrasting Islamic-era histories where Hajj is a pre-Islamic pan-Arabian ritual. Likewise, pre-Islamic poetry centers the Hajj on Allah, as does the Quran, but unlike later Arabic histories which suggest it was incorporated into the rituals of a polytheistic pantheon.

Structural features of the poetry may have helped memorize it during transmission, such as its meter and rhyme. In addition, maintaining the meter of poetry would guard against some forms of editing of the poems, because word substitutions will often disrupt the meter.

=== Criteria for authentication ===
Criteria have been proposed to distinguish authentic from inauthentic material: lines attributed to pre-Islamic poetry are suspect if they use or depend on overtly Quranic or Islamic phraseology, or if they are recruited by the authors that record them as support for specific political or exegetical positions. Likewise, heightened confidence might be placed on poems or lines which cluster with other poems or lines absent any suspicious material, lack anachronisms, and comport with beliefs held by pre-Islamic Arabs, especially when those are the views attributed by the Quran to its opponents but differ from the types of views attributed to Muhammad's opponents in later Arabic histories.

== Comparison with Islamic poetry ==
There are several characteristics that distinguish pre-Islamic poetry from the poetry of later times. One of these characteristics is that in pre-Islamic poetry more attention was given to the eloquence and the wording of the verse than to the poem as whole. This resulted in poems characterized by strong vocabulary and short ideas but with loosely connected verses. A second characteristic is the romantic or nostalgic prelude with which pre-Islamic poems would often start. In these preludes, a thematic unit called "nasib," the poet would remember his beloved and her deserted home and its ruins.

== Comparison with the Quran ==
=== Style ===
The Quran distinguishes itself from shiʿr, a term that would later be taken to mean "poetry". According to tradition, Arabic poetry was at its height among the Arabs in the time of Muhammad, both in terms of its development and in superiority over all other forms of literary speech. Tradition holds that the Quran outcompeted the greatest poetry of its day, and as such, was an indicate of its inimitability. Comparisons between the style and quality of pre-Islamic poetry and the Quran were met with accusations of heresy. Some putatively pre-Islamic poems were redacted in the Islamic period to exhibit stylistic features and Quranic echoes, an example being one poem of the female poet al-Khansa'.

86% of the lines of the Quran are involved in rhyme, but these lines do not have any regular meter. This style has been compared or identified by many with the style of another form of speech in pre-Islamic times: rhymed prose, or saj'.

=== Narrative ===
The Quran has what historians have called an "ahistorical" view of the past: the passage of time ultimately is of little consequence across human history as the human condition is ultimately one where the individual must choose between good and evil. Therefore, stories of punishment and destruction occur across in the same, repetitive pattern, across times and places. The Quranic view of mankind is therefore not "historical" but "moral". This has been compared to the view of man in pre-Islamic Arabic poetry, which also depicts an essentially ahistorical and moral view of man across time. The chief difference between the two is instead in the moral values that they elevate for humanity across time: whereas this is belief (imān) for the Quran, it is manly virtue (murūwa) and tribalistic chauvinism in pre-Islamic poetry.

Another similarity raised between the two is that some pre-Islamic Arabian odes, like the Quranic punishment narratives, begin with evocations of ruined or destroyed historical sites. However, the two texts invoke these ruined habitations for different purposes. For the odes, it is to emphasize the permance of nature, even as human civilizations come and go. For the Quran, it is to warn its audience about God's ability to destroy their civilization if they fail to obey him.

The content of the Quran has been compared several times to the poetry of Umayya ibn Abi as-Salt. Both Umayya and the Quran treat similar prominent topics in the domains of creation, eschatology, and episodes of biblical prophetology. Both treat Thamud as an extinct tribe of the distant past, describe the story of the tribe of Thamud and the she-camel, describe an ascent by demons/jinn to the firmament where they are pelted by heavenly defence systems, and contain a similar story of the Annunciation to Mary. Both contain a flood narrative. Both texts use the word tannūr in their flood narratives, which appears as a hapax legomenon in the Quran. The poetry of Labid has been described as proto-Islamic by Suzanne Stetkevych, in the way that it and the Quran express similar values. The poetry of Al-Nabigha, like the Quran, describes the lore around King Solomon and his subduing of creatures like jinn. Comparisons and contrasts have been made between imagery of nature in the Quran and poetry.

=== Poetry in Quranic exegesis ===
At first, the use of poetry in the exegesis of the Quran was occasional and infrequent. The philologist Abū ʿUbaydah (d. 825) was one of the first to do so in his Majāz al-Qurʾān. He brings up a line of poetry from Amr ibn Kulthum in trying to argue that the word Quran semantically derives, not from the common Semitic lexeme used in other languages to mean "to read" (or the like), but instead "to combine" (in the sense that its surahs are combined). He then cites a line of poetry from Al-Nabigha to again offer an etymological derivation of the word for "surah" independent of Syriac or other non-Arabic languages. Abū ʿUbaydah ends with another Arabizing argument for "ayah" although without poetic citation.

== See also ==
- List of Arabic-language poets
- Pre-Islamic Arabian inscriptions
