= Kitab al-Hamasah =

Book by Abu Tammam

Kitāb al-Ḥamāsah (الحماسة)
- Author: Abū Tammām (Ḥabīb ibn Aws al-Ṭāʾī)
- Language: Arabic
- Subject: Anthology of Arabic poetry (pre-Islamic, early Islamic, Abbasid)
- Genre: Poetry anthology
- Publication date: ca. 835 CE (compiled)
- Publication place: Abbasid Caliphate (classical Arabic world)
- Media type: Manuscript / Print

Ḥamāsah (from Arabic حماسة valour) is a well-known ten-book anthology of pre-Islamic Arabic poetry, compiled in the 9th century by Abu Tammam. Along with the Asma'iyyat, Mufaddaliyat, Jamharat Ash'ar al-Arab, and Mu'allaqat, Hamasah is considered one of the primary sources of early Arabic poetry. The work is especially important for having been the first Arabic anthology compiled by a poet and not a philologist and is the first in the Hamasah literary genre. The first and largest section of the work, al-ḥamāsah (valour), provides the name for several other anthologies of this type.

The anthology contains a total of 884 poems, most of which are short extracts of longer poems, grouped by subject matter. The selections date back to pre-Islamic, Islamic and early 'Abbasid times, although some are personally by Abu Tammam. Perhaps the oldest in the collection are those relating to the forty year long Basus War, which ended about 534 CE. Of the period of the Abbasid caliphs, under whom Abū Tammām himself lived, there are probably not more than sixteen fragments.

The Ḥamāsah was probably compiled around 835 CE, while Abū Tammām was staying at Hamadan in Iran, where he had access to a very good library. It quickly acquired the status of a classic work. Saladin is said to have known it by heart.

== Content ==
The ten headings are:

1. Al-Ḥamāsah "Valour"
2. Al-Marāthī, "Elegies";
3. Al-Adab, "Proper conduct";
4. An-Nasīb, "Love";
5. Al-Hijāʿ, "Invective";
6. Al-Adyāf wa al-madīḥ, "Hospitality and praise of the generous";
7. Aṣ-Ṣifāt, "Descriptive verses/pieces";
8. As-Sayr wa an-Nuʾas, "desert travel";
9. Al-Mulah, "Clever curiosities";
10. Madhammāt an-nisaʾ, "the censure of women"

Of these books the first is by far the longest, both in the number and extent of its poems, and the first two together make up more than half the bulk of the work.

== Analysis ==
The following analysis, by Charles Lyall, was written for the Encyclopædia Britannica Eleventh Edition (1911).

Most of the poems belong to the class of extempore or occasional utterances, as distinguished from qaṣīdas, or elaborately finished odes. While the latter abound with comparisons and long descriptions, in which the skill of the poet is exhibited with much art and ingenuity, the poems of the Ḥamāsa are short, direct and for the most part free from comparisons; the transitions are easy, the metaphors simple, and the purpose of the poem clearly indicated. It is due probably to the fact that this style of composition was chiefly sought by Abū Tammām in compiling his collection that he has chosen hardly anything from the works of the most famous poets of antiquity. Not a single piece from Imru' al-Qais occurs in the Ḥamāsa, nor are there any from Alqama al-Fahl, Zuhayr or Aʽshā; Al-Nabigha is represented only by two pieces of four and three verses respectively; ʽAntara by two pieces of four verses each; Tarafa by one piece of five verses; Labīd by one piece of three verses; and Amr ibn Kulthum by one piece of four verses. The compilation is thus essentially an anthology of minor poets, and exhibits (so far at least as the more ancient poems are concerned) the general average of poetic utterance at a time when to speak in verse was the daily habit of every warrior of the desert.

To this description, however, there is an important exception in the book entitled an-Nasī, containing verses relating to women and love. In the classical age of Arab poetry it was the established rule that all qasidas, whatever their purpose, must begin with the mention of women and their charms, in order, as earlier critics said, that the hearts of the hearers might be softened and inclined to regard kindly the theme which the poet proposed to unfold. The fragments included in this part of the work are therefore generally taken from the opening verses of qasidas; where this is not the case, they are chiefly compositions of the early Islamic period, when the school of exclusively erotic poetry (of which the greatest representative was Umar ibn Abi Rabi'ah) arose.

The compiler was himself a distinguished poet in the style of his day, and wandered through many provinces of the Muslim empire earning money and fame by his skill in panegyric. About 220 AH (835 CE) he went to Khorasan, then ruled by Abdallah ibn Tahir, whom he praised and by whom he was rewarded; on his journey home he passed through Hamadan, and was there detained for many months a guest of Abu-l-Wafā, son of Salama, the road onward being blocked by heavy falls of snow. During his residence at Hamadan, Abu Tammam is said to have compiled or composed, from the materials which he found in Abu-l-Wafā's library, five poetical works, of which one was the Hamasah. This collection remained as a precious heirloom in the family of Abu-l-Wafā until their fortunes decayed, when it fell into the hands of a man of Dinavar named Abu-l-ʽAwādhil, who carried it to Isfahan and made it known to the learned of that city.

The worth of the Hamasah as a storehouse of ancient legend, of faithful detail regarding the usages of the pagan time and early simplicity of the Arabs, can hardly be exaggerated. The high level of excellence which is found in its selections, both as to form and matter, is remarkable, and caused it to be said that Abu Tammam displayed higher qualities as a poet in his choice of extracts from the ancients than in his own compositions. What strikes us chiefly in the class of poetry of which the Hamasah is a specimen, is its exceeding truth and reality, its freedom from artificiality and hearsay, the evident first-hand experience which the singers possessed of all of which they sang. For historical purposes the value of the collection is not small; but most of all there shines forth from it a complete portraiture of the hardy and manful nature, the strenuous life of passion and battle, the lofty contempt of cowardice, niggardliness and servility, which marked the valiant stock who bore Islam abroad in a flood of new life over the civilizations of Persia, Egypt and Byzantium. It has the true stamp of the heroic time, of its cruelty and wantonness as of its strength and beauty.

== Later commentary ==
No fewer than twenty commentaries were enumerated by the encyclopaedist Kâtip Çelebi (also known as Ḥājjī Khalīfa). Of these the earliest was by Abū Riyāsh (otherwise ar-Riyāshī), who died in 257 AH; excerpts from it, chiefly in elucidation of the circumstances in which the poems were composed, were frequently given by at-Tibrīzī. He was followed by the grammarian Abu-l-Fatḥ ibn al-Jinnī (died 392 AH), and later by Abu Ali al-Marzuqi of Isfahan (died 421 AH). Upon al-Marzuqi's commentary is chiefly founded that of Abu Zakarīyā Yaḥyā at-Tibrīzī (421 AH – 502), which was published by Georg Freytag, together with a Latin translation and notes (1828–1851). This monumental work, the labour of a life, is a treasure of information regarding the classical age of Arab literature.

The Hamasah was rendered into German verse by Friedrich Rückert (Stuttgart, 1846), who not only gave translations of almost all the poems proper to the work, but added numerous fragments drawn from other sources, especially those occurring in the scholia of at-Tibrīzī, as well as the Mu'allaqat of Zuhayr and ʽAntara, the Lamiyyat al-'Arab traditionally by Al-Shanfara, and the Bānat Suʽād of Ka'b, son of Zuhayr. A small collection of translations, chiefly in metres imitating those of the original, was published in London by Sir Charles Lyall in 1885.

Several collections of a similar kind to Abu Tammam's, also called Ḥamāsa, exist. The best-known and earliest of these is the Ḥamāsa of Buhturi (died 284 AH), of which the unique manuscript in the Leiden University Library was reproduced by photolithography in 1909. Four other works of the same name, formed on the model of Abu Tammam's compilation, were mentioned by Kâtip Çelebi. Besides these, a work entitled Ḥamasat ar-Rāh ("the Ḥamāsa of wine") was composed by Abu-l-‘Alāal–Ma‘arrī (died 429 AH).

== See also ==
- Kitab al-Aghani
- Mu'allaqat
- Mufaddaliyat
- Lamiyyat al-'Arab
- Pre-Islamic Arabic poetry
