= Jamharat Ash'ar al-Arab =

Jamharat Ashʿar al-Arab (جمهرة أشعار العرب)
- Editor: Saʿīd ʿAmmūn (for some editions)
- Author: Abū Zayd Muḥammad ibn Abī al-Khaṭṭāb al-Qurashī
- Language: Arabic
- Subject: Arabic poetry; anthology of pre-Islamic and early Islamic poems
- Genre: Poetry anthology
- Publisher: al-Maṭbaʿah al-Amīriyah al-Kubrá (Būlāq edition, 1890)
- Publication date: ca. 1890 (first printed edition in Būlāq)
- Publication place: Egypt (for many printed editions)
- Media type: Print
- Pages: 195 (first printed edition; Būlāq)
- ISBN: 9957686526

Jamharat Ash'ar al-Arab (Arabic: جمهرة أشعار العرب; The Gathering of the Arabs' Verses) is a pre-Islamic Arabic poetry anthology by Abu Zayd al-Qurashi. The date of publication is unknown, and al-Qurashi is supposed by various scholars to have lived in the 8th, 9th or 10th centuries. It contains seven sections, each containing seven qasidas.

The Jamharat Ash'ar al-Arab is one of five canonical primary sources of early Arabic poetry. The four others are Mu'allaqat, Hamasah, Mufaddaliyat and the Asma'iyyat.

== Sections ==
The first section consists of the seven Mu'allaqat. The anthology is the first source to use the name Mu'allaqat; earlier writers describe the poems simply as "the Seven." Al-Qurashi's choice of poems is somewhat idiosyncratic, as he includes Al-Nabigha and Al-A'sha among the seven and excludes Antarah ibn Shaddad and Al-Harith.

The second section is called "al-Mujamharat" ("the assembled"). It contains poems by Abid ibn al-Abras, Adi ibn Zayd, Bashar bin Abi Khazm al-Asadi, Umayya bin Abi al-Salat, Khadash bin Zuhair, Al-Namar bin Tulab, and Antarah ibn Shaddad.

The third section is "al-Muntuqayat", "the chosen". Represented poets include Abu Layla al-Muhalhel, Urwa ibn al-Ward, and Dorayd bin Al Soma.

The fourth section, "al-Mudhahhabat" ("the gilded ones") consists solely of poetry from the Banu Aws and Banu Khazraj tribes. It contains poems by Hassan ibn Thabit, Abdullah ibn Rawaha, and Amr ibn Imru al-Qays.

The fifth section contains elegies, and the sixth, "al-Mashubat", contains "testimonies of faith mingled with heresy". One of the Mashubat is by Ka'b ibn Zuhayr, famous for reciting the poem in question in front of Muhammad.

The final section, "al-Mulhamat", is ambiguous in meaning but probably means that the poems refer to bloody fights or struggles. Represented poets include Al-Farazdaq and Al-Akhtal al-Taghlibi.
