= Mu'allaqat =

Group of old Arabic poems

- Author: Various poets
- Original title: المعلقات
- Language: Arabic
- Genre: Poetry
- Published: 8th century (compiled)
- Publication place: Arabia
- Media type: Manuscript

The Muʻallaqāt (Arabic: المعلقات, [ʔalmuʕallaqaːt]) is a compilation of seven long pre-Islamic Arabic poems. The name means The Suspended Odes or The Hanging Poems, they were named so because these poems were hung in the Kaaba in Mecca. Some scholars have also suggested that the hanging is figurative, as if the poems "hang" in the reader's mind.

Along with the Mufaddaliyat, Jamharat Ash'ar al-Arab, Asma'iyyat, and the Hamasah, the Mu'allaqāt are considered the primary source for early written Arabic poetry. Scholar Peter N. Stearns goes so far as to say that they represent "the most sophisticated poetic production in the history of Arabic letters."

== History ==
=== Compilation ===
The original compiler of the poems may have been Hammad al-Rawiya (8th century). The grammarian Ahmad ibn Muhammad al-Nahhas (d. 949 CE) says in his commentary on the Mu'allaqat: "The true view of the matter is this: when Hammad al-Rawiya saw how little men cared for poetry, he collected these seven pieces, urged people to study them, and said to them: 'These are the [poems] [sic] of renown.'" Orfali suggests that the connection is "the multi-thematic qaṣidāh form".

Hammad was a Persian by descent, but a client of the Arab tribe, Bakr ibn Wa'il. For this reason, some suppose he not only received into the collection a poem of the famous poet Tarafa, of the tribe of Bakr, but also that of another Bakrite, Harith. The latter had been a prominent chieftain, so the inclusion of his poem could serve as a counterpoise to Harith's contemporary 'Amr, chief of the Taghlib, the rival tribe of the Bakr. 'Amr praises the Taghlib in glowing terms: Harith, in a similar vein, extols the Bakr ancestors of Hammad's patrons.

The collection appears to have consisted of the same seven poems which are found in modern editions, composed respectively by Imru' al-Qais, Tarafa, Zuhayr, Labīd, 'Antara Ibn Shaddad, 'Amr ibn Kulthum, and Harith ibn Hilliza. These are enumerated both by Ibn Abd Rabbih (860–940 CE), and, on the authority of the older philologists, by Nahhas; and all subsequent commentators seem to follow them. There is, however, evidence of the existence, at an early period, of a slightly different arrangement. The Jamharat Ash'ar al-Arab claims that two of the most competent ancient authorities on Arabic poetry, al-Mufaddal (d. c. 790) and Abu ʿUbaidah (d. 824 CE), had already assigned to the "Seven" (i.e. "the seven Mu'allaqat") a poem each of al-Nabigha and al-A'sha in place of those of 'Antara and Harith. The learned Ibn Qutaiba (9th century), in his book Of Poetry and Poets, mentions as belonging to the "Seven" not only the poem of 'Amr, which has been reckoned among the Mu'allaqat (ed. de Goeje, p. 120), but also a poem of 'Abid ibn al-Abras (ibid. 144). The variance in the lists of poets may have been due to tribal rivalries.

Nabigha and A'sha were more famous than any of the poets represented in the Mu'allaqat, with the exception of Imru' al-Qais, so it could be that scholars of a somewhat later date appended a poem by each of these to the Mu'allaqat, without intending by this to make them an integral part of that work. This is indicated by the introductory words of Yahya ibn Ali Tibrizi (d. 1109 C.E.) to his commentary on the Mu'allaqat. Appended to this he gives a commentary to a poem of Nabigha, to one of A'sha, and moreover one to that poem of 'Abid which Ibn Qutaiba had counted among the seven. Ibn Khaldun (1332–1406 CE), in his Muqaddimah, speaks of nine Mu'allaqat, but this was probably due to a misunderstanding.

=== The hanging of the poems ===
Ibn Abd Rabbih in the Al-ʿIqd al-Farīd ("The Precious Necklace") states, "The Arabs had such an interest in poetry, and valued it so highly, that they took seven long pieces selected from the ancient poetry, wrote them in gold on pieces of Coptic linen folded up, and hung them up (allaqat) [sic] on the curtains which covered the Kaaba. Hence we speak of 'the golden poem of Imru' al-Qais,' 'the golden poem of Zuhayr.' The number of the golden poems is seven; they are also called 'the suspended' (al-Muʻallaqāt)." Similar statements are found in later Arabic works. Al-Nahhas, however, denied this in his commentary on the Muʻallaqāt: "As for the assertion that they were hung up in the Kaaba, it is not known to any of those who have handed down ancient poems."

No trace of this story is found in early sources about Mecca or the customs of pre-Islamic Arabia. There are records of other items being hung in the Kaaba: a Meccan was reported to have hung a spoil of battle on the Kaaba (Ibn Hisham, ed. Wiistenfeld, p. 431), and an important document may have been deposited there (ibid. p. 230). A passage of late origin claims that the poems were taken down after the capture of Mecca by the Prophet (De Sacy, Chrestom. ii. 480), but the event is not otherwise attested.

While the poems were almost certainly transmitted orally before being recorded in writing, scholars such as Brown see no reason why significant change through the oral transmission should exist—because the poems were held in high regard, there would be more social pressure to repeat them precisely.

Another version of the legend, also given by Nahhas, is as follows:

Most of the Arabs were accustomed to meet at Okaz and recite verses; then, if the king was pleased with any poem, he said, 'Hang it up, and preserve it among my treasures.'"

However, there was no king of all the Arabs, and it is unlikely that any Arabian king attended the fair at Okaz. The story that the poems were written in gold originated in the name "the golden poems" (literally "the gilded"), a figurative expression for excellence. The designation "suspended" may be interpreted in the same way, referring to those (poems) which have been raised, on account of their value, to a specially honourable position. Another derivative of the same root is ʻilq, "precious thing." Another name sometimes used for these poems is assumut, "strings of pearls". From this usage it became popular, even in ordinary prose, to refer to speech in rhythmical form as naqm "to string pearls." The selection of these seven poems is unlikely to have been the work of the ancient Arabs, but rather some one writing at a later date.

Another hypothesis is given by Robson, who argues that the title was given by Hammad to indicate that the poems are "suspended" from their rightful place—that is, like a disrespected wife denied her place by a husband of multiple wives (Qu'ran 4.128), the poems are denied their proper place: a diwan. Regardless of meaning, most scholars doubt the poems were physically hung at the Kaaba.

== Authorship ==
=== The seven renowned ones ===
The lives of these poets were spread over a period of more than a hundred years. The earliest of the seven was Imru' al-Qais, regarded by many as the most illustrious of Arabian Muʻallaqah poets. His exact date cannot be determined; but probably the best part of his career fell within the midst of the sixth century. He was a scion of the royal house of the tribe Kinda, which lost its power at the death of its king, Harith ibn ʻAmr, in the year 529. The poet's royal father, Hojr, by some accounts a son of this Harith, was killed by a Bedouin tribe, the Banu Asad ibn Khuzaymah. The son led an adventurous life as a refugee, now with one tribe, now with another, and appears to have died young. A contemporary of Imruʻ al-Qais was Abid ibn al-Abras, one poem of whose is by some authorities reckoned among the collection.

The Muʻallaqah of 'Amr ibn Kulthum hurls defiance against the king of al-Hirah, 'Amr III ibn al-Mundhir, who reigned from the summer of 554 until 568 or 569, and was afterwards killed by the poet. This prince is also addressed by Harith in his Muʻallaqa. Of Tarafa, a few satirical verses have been preserved, directed against this same king. This agrees with the fact that a grandson of the Qais ibn Khalid, mentioned as a rich and influential man in Tarafa's Muʻallaqah (v. 80 or 81), figured at the time of the Battle of Dhi Qar, in which the tribe Bakr routed a Persian army. This battle falls about 610 CE.

The Muʻallaqah of Antarah ibn Shaddad and that of Zuhayr bin Abi Sulma contain allusions to the feuds of the kindred tribes Banu Abs and Banu Dhubyan. Famous as these contests were, their time cannot accurately be ascertained. But the date of the two poets can be approximately determined from other data. Ka'b bin Zuhayr, composed first a satire, and then, in the year 630, a eulogy on the Prophet; another son, Bujair, had begun, somewhat sooner, to celebrate Muhammad. Antara killed the grandfather of Ahnaf ibn Qais, who died at an advanced age in 686 or 687; he outlived 'Abdallah ibn Simma, whose brother Duraid was old when he died in battle against Muhammad's army (early in 630 CE); and he had communications with Ward, whose son, the poet Urwah ibn al-Ward, may perhaps have survived the flight of Muhammad to Medina. From these indications, German scholar Theodor Nöldeke placed the productive period of both poets in the end of the 6th century. The historical background of Antara's Muʻallaqat lies somewhat earlier than that of Zuhayr's.

The poems of 'Alqama ibn 'Abada and Al-Nabigha are from the same period. In Al-Nabigha's poem sometimes reckoned as a Muʻallaqah, he addresses himself to the king of al-Hirah, al-Nu'man III ibn al-Mundhir, who reigned in the two last decades of the sixth century. The same king is mentioned as a contemporary in one of poems of ʻAlqama.

The poem of al-A'sha, sometimes added to the Muʻallaqāt, contains an allusion to the battle of Dhi Qar (under the name "Battle of Hinw", v. 62). This poet, lived to compose a poem in honour of Muhammad, and died not long before 630 CE.

Labīd is the only one of these poets who was still alive by the time Muhammad began preaching the Quran, and later converted to Islam. His Muʻallaqa, however, like almost all his other poetical works, belongs to the pre-Islamic period. He may have lived until 661 or later.

=== Hammad Ar-Rawiya's seven poets ===
1. Imru' al-Qais
2. Labīd
3. Tarafa
4. Zuhayr ibn Abi Sulma
5. Antara Ibn Shaddad
6. Amr ibn Kulthum
7. Harith ibn Hilliza

=== Poets sometimes numbered amongst the seven ===
1. Al-Nabigha
2. al-A'sha
3. 'Abid ibn al-Abras

== The poems ==
The seven Mu'allaqat, and also the poems appended to them, represent almost every type of ancient Arabian poetry. Tarafa's poem includes a long, anatomically exact description of his camel, common in pre-Islamic poetry. The Mu'allaqat of 'Amr and Harith contain fakhr (boasting) about the splendors of their tribe. The song of Zuhayr is presented as the "practical wisdom of a sober man of the world." The other poems are fairly typical examples of the customary qasida, the long poem of ancient Arabia. The Mu'allaqat of 'Antara has a warlike tone, in contrast to the peaceful themes of Labid.

There is a high degree of uniformity in the Mu'allaqat. The poets use a strict metrical system. The only poem which shows unusual metrical freedom is the song of 'Abid. However, Abid's contemporary Imru' al-Qais, in a poem which in other respects also exhibits certain coincidences with that of 'Abid, also shows considerable licence in the use of the same rare metre. The deviations from the schema in 'Abid may be due to incorrect transmission by compilers who failed to grasp the metre. The other poems ascribed to 'Abid, together with all the rest attributed to Imru' al-Qais, are constructed in precise accord with the metrical canons.

The last poet in the Mu'allaqat is Hammad, the compiler of the Mu'allaqat. Hammad may have altered the text and transposed some verses. Some of the Mu'allaqat have several preambles: so, especially, that of 'Amr, the first eight verses of which belong not to the poem, but to another poet. Some of the poems exhibit great divergences (both in the order and number of the verses and in textual details) from their exemplars in other poetic anthologies. This is particularly the case with the oldest Mu'allaqat, that of Imru' al-Qais. According to Nöldeke, the most accurate text is that of the latest Mu'allaqat, the song of Labid.

The Mu'allaqat exist in many manuscripts, some with old commentaries. Printed editions include that of Charles James Lyall with the commentary of Tibrizi (Calcutta, 1894). Johnson's detailed translation, published by the Bombay Education Society in 1893, includes an introduction and analysis by Arabic scholar Shaikh Faizullabhai. A notable commentary titled Ḥall al-ʿUqdah fī Sharḥ Sabʿ Muʿallaqah was written by Momtazuddin Ahmad.

== See also ==
- Hamasah
- Kitab al-Aghani
- Mufaddaliyat
