= Mufaddaliyat =

Anthology of ancient Arabic poems

- Author: Mufaḍḍal al-Ḍabbī
- Original title: المفضليات
- Language: Arabic
- Subject: Pre-Islamic Arabic poetry
- Genre: Anthology
- Publication date: 762-784 CE
- Publication place: Abbasid Caliphate
- Media type: Print

The Mufaddaliyyat (Arabic: المفضليات / ALA-LC: al-Mufaḍḍaliyāt), meaning "The Examination of al-Mufaḍḍal", is an anthology of pre-Islamic Arabic poems deriving its name from its author, Mufaḍḍal al-Ḍabbī, who compiled it between 762 and his death in 784 CE. It contains 126 poems, some complete odes, others fragmentary. They are all of the Golden Age of Arabic poetry (500—650) and are considered to be the best choices of poems from that period by different authors. There are 68 authors, two of whom were Christian. The oldest poems in the collection date from about 500 CE. The collection is a valuable source concerning pre-Islamic Arab life.

The Mufaḍḍaliyāt is one of five canonical primary sources of early Arabic poetry. The four others are Mu'allaqat, Hamasah, Jamharat Ash'ar al-Arab and the Asma'iyyat.

== Historical background ==
A story about the circumstances behind the collection of the Mufaddaliyyat is found in the works of the 10th century scholar Ibn al-Nadim. In this narrative, the circumstances occurred in the Abbasid royal court of Caliph al-Mansur (r. 754–775 CE). According to this account, al-Mufaddal al-Dabbi, already then a reputed expert of pre-Islamic poetry, was a personal tutor of al-Mansur's son, al-Mahdi. One day, al-Mansur noticed and listened in on his son reciting an ode by the pre-Islamic poet al-Musayyab to his tutor. Pleased by the situation, he asked al-Mufaddal to produce a collection of these poems for the benefit of his son. Obliging him, al-Mufaddal did so, leading to the birth of the Mufaddaliyyat.

== Description ==
The collection is a record of the highest importance of the thought and poetic art of Pre-Islamic Arabia in the immediate period before the appearance of the Prophet Muhammad. The great majority belonged to the days of Jahiliyyah ('Ignorance')—no more than five or six of the 126 poems appear to have been by Islamic era poets—and though a number of Jahiliyyah-born poets had adopted Islam (e.g. Mutammim ibn Nuwayrah, Rabi'a ibn Maqrum, Abda ibn at-Tabib and Abu Dhu'ayb), their work bears few marks of the new faith. While ancient themes of virtue; hospitality to the guest and the poor, extravagance of wealth, valour in battle, tribal loyalty, are praised yet other practices forbidden in Islam—Wine, gambling (the game of maisir), etc.,—are all celebrated by poets professing adherence to the faith. Neither the old idolatry nor the new spirituality are themes. Mufaḍḍal al-Ḍabbī gathers works by 68 poets in 126 pieces. Little of these poets, known as al-Muqillun, survives, unlike those poets whose diwans have ensured their enduring fame. Yet many pieces selected by al-Mufaddal are celebrated. Several, such as 'Alqama ibn 'Abada's two long poems (Nos. 119 and 120), Mutammim ibn Nuwayrah's three odes (Nos. 9, 67, 68), Salama ibn Jandal splendid poem (No. 22), al-Shanfara's beautiful nasib (opening theme, or prologue) (No. 20), and Abd-Yaghuth's death-song (No. 30), reach a high degree of excellence. The last of the series, a long elegy (No. 126) by Abu Dhu'ayb al-Hudhail on the death of his sons is one of the most admired; almost every verse of this poem is cited in illustration of some phrase or meaning of a word in the national Arabic lexicons. Al-Harith ibn Hilliza is the only poet included also in the Mu'allaqat. Although diwans (poetry collections) by early poets survive; e.g., Bishr ibn Abi Khazim, al-Hadira, Amir ibn al-Tufail, 'Alqama ibn 'Abada, al-Muthaqqib, Ta'abbata Sharran and Abu Dhu'ayb), it is unclear how many were compiled before al-Mufaddal's anthology of forty-eight pre-Islamic and twenty Islamic-era poets.

== Sources ==
The first extant written collection of poetry containing pre-Islamic works was by al-Mufaddal ad-Dabbi (d. after 780 AD). His collection included 126 poems, usually involving one or two poems per poet, and was attributed to a number of early Islamic and pre-Islamic figures. 67 poets are represented, only 6 of whom are thought to have been born Muslim. 78 of the poems (or 62%) are from Najdi/Iraqi tribes. Another 28% were from technically Najdi tribes but in cultural contact with the Hejaz. Only 13 (10%) are from the southern Hejaz, with 2 from the Quraysh (who were ultimately not a poetically significant group in this period, though their status as-such would be inflated later). His collection came to be known as the Mufaḍḍaliyyāt and appears to have been composed as a pedagogical text for the Abbasid family.

== Number of poems ==
The collection contains 126 long and short pieces of verse in its present form. This number is included in the recension of al-Anbari, who received the text from Abu 'Ikrima of Dabba, who read it with Ibn al-A‘rābī, al-Mufaḍḍal's stepson and inheritor of the tradition. We know from the Fihrist of Ibn al-Nadim (d. ca. 988 AD) that the original book, as transmitted by Ibn al-A‘rābī, contained 128 pieces and began with the poet Ta’abbaṭa Sharran Thābit ibn Jābir; this number agrees with the Vienna manuscript, which includes an additional poem, poems annotated by al-Anbari, al-Muraqqish the Elder, etc., and a poem by al-Harith ibn Hilliza. The Fihrist states (p. 68) that some scholars included more and others fewer poems, while the order of the poems in the several recensions differed. It is noticeable that this traditional text, and the accompanying scholia, as represented by al-Anbari's recension, derive from al-Mufaddal's fellow philolgists of the Kufan school. Sources from the rival school of Basra claimed however that al-Mufaddal's original dīwān ('collection') was a much smaller volume of poems. In his commentary (Berlin MS), Ahmad ibn Muhammad al-Marzuqi gives the number of original poems as thirty, or eighty in a clearer passage, (Note: In the dhail or supplement to the Amali of al-Qali.); and mentions too, that al-Asma'i and his Basran grammarians, augmented this to a hundred and twenty. This tradition, ascribed by al-Marzuqi and his teacher Abu Ali al-Farisi to Abu 'Ikrima of Dabba, who al-Anbari represented as the transmitter of the integral text from Ibn al-A'rabi, gets no mention by al-Anbari, and it would seem improbable as the two schools of Basrah and Kufah were in sharp competition. Ibn al-A'rabi in particular was in the habit of censuring al-Asma'i's interpretations of the ancient poems. It is scarcely likely that he would have accepted his rivals' additions to the work of his stepfather, and handed them on to Abu 'Ikrima with his annotations.

== Editions ==
- Die Mufaḍḍaliyyāt, ed. H. Thorbecke. 1. Heft (Leipzig 1885). Heinrich Thorbecke based this edition on the text of the Berlin Codex, He began this work in 1885 but had only completed the first fasciculus, with forty-two poems, when he died.
- al-Mufaḍḍaliyyāt Vol.I text, with short commentary from al-Anbari (Constantinople 1891).
- al-Mufaḍḍaliyyāt, ed., Abū Bakr b. ʿU. Dag̲h̲istānī (Cairo 1324/1906).; complete text, with short glosses from al-Anbari's commentary; based generally on the Cairo codex (See above), with references to Thorbecke's scholarly edition in the first half of the work.
- The Mufaḍḍaliyyāt, an anthology of ancient Arabic odes (Oxford 1921), ed. C.J. Lyall; complete edition of al-Anbārī's text and commentary; poems translated by Charles James Lyall: i, Arabic text; ii, Translation and notes (Oxford 1918); iii, Indexes to the Arabic text, compiled by A. A. Bevan (London 1924), paralleled by his Arabic-language edition: Dīwān al-Mufaḍḍaliyāt: wa-hiya nukhbah min qaṣāʼid al-shuʻarāʼ al-muqallīn fī al-Jāhilīyah wa-awāʼil al-Islām, ed. by Kārlūs Yaʻqūb Lāyil (Bayrūt: Maṭbaʻat al-Ābāʼ al-Yasūʻiyyīn, 1920).
- al-Mufaḍḍaliyyāt, ed., Ahmad Mohammad Shakir; Abdassalam Mohammad Hârun, Cairo, Dar al-Ma`ârif 1942.
- S̲h̲arḥ Ik̲h̲tiyārāt al-Muf, ed. F. Ḳabāwā, i-ii (Damascus 1388-91/1968-71); containing 59 poems and commentary by al-Tibrīzī.
- S̲h̲arḥ al-Mufaḍḍaliyyāt, ed. A.M. al-Bid̲j̲āwī, i-iii (Cairo 1977).

== See also ==
- Hamasah
- Kitab al-Aghani
- Mu'allaqat
