= Asma'iyyat =

Anthology of Arabic poetry

Asma’iyyat (الأصمعيات)
- Author: Al-Aṣmaʿī (ʿAbd al-Malik ibn Qurayb al-Aṣmaʿī)
- Language: Arabic
- Subject: Early Arabic poetry; anthology
- Genre: Poetry anthology
- Publisher: Dar al-Arqam (for one edition)
- Publication date: (various; classical compilation)
- Publication place: (classical Arabic world)
- Media type: Print (hardcover / paperback)
- Pages: 304 (for one edition)
- ISBN: 9789953720852

The Aṣmaʿiyyāt (Arabic: الأصمعيات) is a well-known early anthology of Arabic poetry by Al-Asma'i. The collection is considered one of the primary sources for pre-Islamic Arabic poetry along with the Jamharat Ash'ar al-Arab, Hamasah, Mu'allaqat and Mufaddaliyat. It consists of 92 qasidahs by 71 poets from both Pre-Islamic Arabia (44 of them jahili) as well as the early Islamic era.

Unlike the Mufaddaliyat, the Asma'iyyat have not been preserved in their entirety and there were originally more than the surviving 72 passages. The modern print was first compiled and republished by German Orientalist Wilhelm Ahlwardt.

== See also ==
- Abu Tammam
- al-Mufaddal
