= Al-Khatib al-Tibrizi =

Abū Zakariyyā Yaḥyā ibn ʿAlī al-Shaybānī al-Khaṭīb al-Tibrīzī (Arabic: أبو زكريا يحيى بن علي الشيباني الخطيب التبريزي; 1030–1109), commonly known as Al-Khatib al-Tibrizi, was a prominent 11th-century Arab philologist, grammarian, and literary critic. He is best known for his foundational commentaries on classical Arabic poetry, most notably his commentary on Abu Tammam's Al-Hamasah and the Mu'allaqat.

== Life ==
Al-Tibrizi was born in Tabriz into a family belonging to the Arab tribe of Shayban (Banu Shayban). Pursuing traditional Arabic linguistic and literary studies, he traveled extensively in his youth. He notably studied under the renowned blind poet and scholar Al-Ma'arri.

He later moved to Baghdad, where his mastery of Arabic philology and grammar earned him significant recognition. He was appointed as a professor of literature at the prestigious Nizamiyya Madrasa, where he taught until his death in January 1109.

== Works ==
Al-Tibrizi authored numerous works primarily focused on Arabic lexicography and poetic commentary. His most enduring contributions include:

- Sharḥ Dīwān al-Ḥamāsah: A highly regarded commentary on Abu Tammam's poetic anthology.
- Sharḥ al-Mu'allaqāt al-'Ashr: An essential commentary on the pre-Islamic suspended odes.
- Sharḥ Saqṭ al-Zand: A commentary on the early poetry of his teacher, Al-Ma'arri.
