= 'Abid ibn al-Abras =

Jahiliyya Arab Poet

ʿAbīd ibn al-Abraṣ Al Asadi (Arabic: عبيد بن الأبرص الأسدي was an Arab poet of the Jahiliyya (pre-Islamic period), thought to have lived in the first half of the sixth century CE.

== Biography ==
Little is known about ibn al-Abraṣ; Charles James Lyall provides an English survey of medieval stories of his life and times, but their reliability is generally doubtful. Ibn al-Abraṣ's tribe was the Banū Asad. Legends about him have him as a contemporary (and victim) of the Lakhmid king al-Mundhir III ibn al-Nu'mān, who died in 554, and Imru' al-Qays, likewise of the late fifth and earlier sixth centuries. Imru' al-Qays, whose father Hujr, king of Kinda, was killed by the Banū Asad, is portrayed as a rival to ibn al-Abraṣ. Reinhard Weipert concluded that

He was one of the leading men of his tribe when they revolted against the supremacy of Ḥujr b. al-Ḥārith, the king of the Banū Kinda and father of the poet Imru' al-Qays (d. c.550), and killed him. There are many divergent versions of how this uprising took place, but it is an undoubted historical event, as ʿAbīd’s poems prove that he took part in it as a contemporary and rival of Imru' al-Qays and finally as his enemy, after the slaying of Ḥujr.

== Work and style ==
Abīd ibn al-Abraṣ's poetry is known largely from a single manuscript, acquired by the British Museum in Beirut in 1907 (now held in the British Library), where it is found along with an anonymous commentary from the Kūfī school.

Thirty largely complete qaṣīdas attributed to ibn al-Abraṣ are known, alongside seventeen framentary poems. Scholars agree that some items are unlikely to have been composed by ibn al-Abraṣ or to date from his era, for example a riddle-contest in which ibn al-Abraṣ poses riddles to Imru' al-Qays, who solves them. On the whole, however, "the very distinct archaism in the structure and the language of the dīwān is", in the words of Francesco Gabrieli, "a strong argument for its authenticity". Making reference to ibn al-Abraṣ's poems as numbered by Lyall, Gabrielli found that

the sententious mind of ʿAbīd is expressed not only in his nostalgia for the past, but also in his praise of himself and of his tribe (iv, vii, xxii, xxiv etc.) and in his virulent polemics against Imru' al-Ḳays and other, unknown, poets. The allusions to his poetical talent are especially noteworthy (x and xxiii): they show that he had a clear conscience of his inspiration and his artistic technique. The old Arab critics admired his descriptions of storms and desert tempests, but the modern reader appreciates most among all the poems of his dīwān his descriptions of animals, such as the famous scene of an eagle chasing a fox (i) and that of the fish in the sea (xxiii). In these poems and in other celebrated tableaux, ʿAbid appears as one of the most powerful poets of the djāhiliyya.

As Gabrielli noted, ibn al-Abraṣ's qaṣīda on the eagle chasing the fox is particularly renowned. It is a very rare example of a poem in the metre basīṭ mukhallaʿ: Ibn Qutayba (d. 889) included it among the Muʿallaqāt; Abū Zayd al-Qurashī's Jamharat ashʿār al-ʿArab included it among the mujamharāt, while al-Tibrīzī (d. 1109) reckoned it one of the best ten qaṣīdas (in his Sharḥ al-qaṣāʿid al-ʿashr.

== Editions and studies ==
- Dīwāns of ʿAbīd Ibn al-Abraṣ, of Asad and ʿĀmir Ibn at-Tufail, of ʿĀmir Ibn Saʿsaʿah, ed. and trans. by Charles James Lyall, E. J. W. Gibb Memorial Series, 21 (Leiden: Brill, 1913).
- Francesco Gabrieli, "La poesia di ʿAbīd ibn al-Abraṣ", Rendiconti dell'Accademia d'Italia, scienze morali (1940), 240–51.
