= Wilhelm Ahlwardt =

German orientalist (1828–1909)

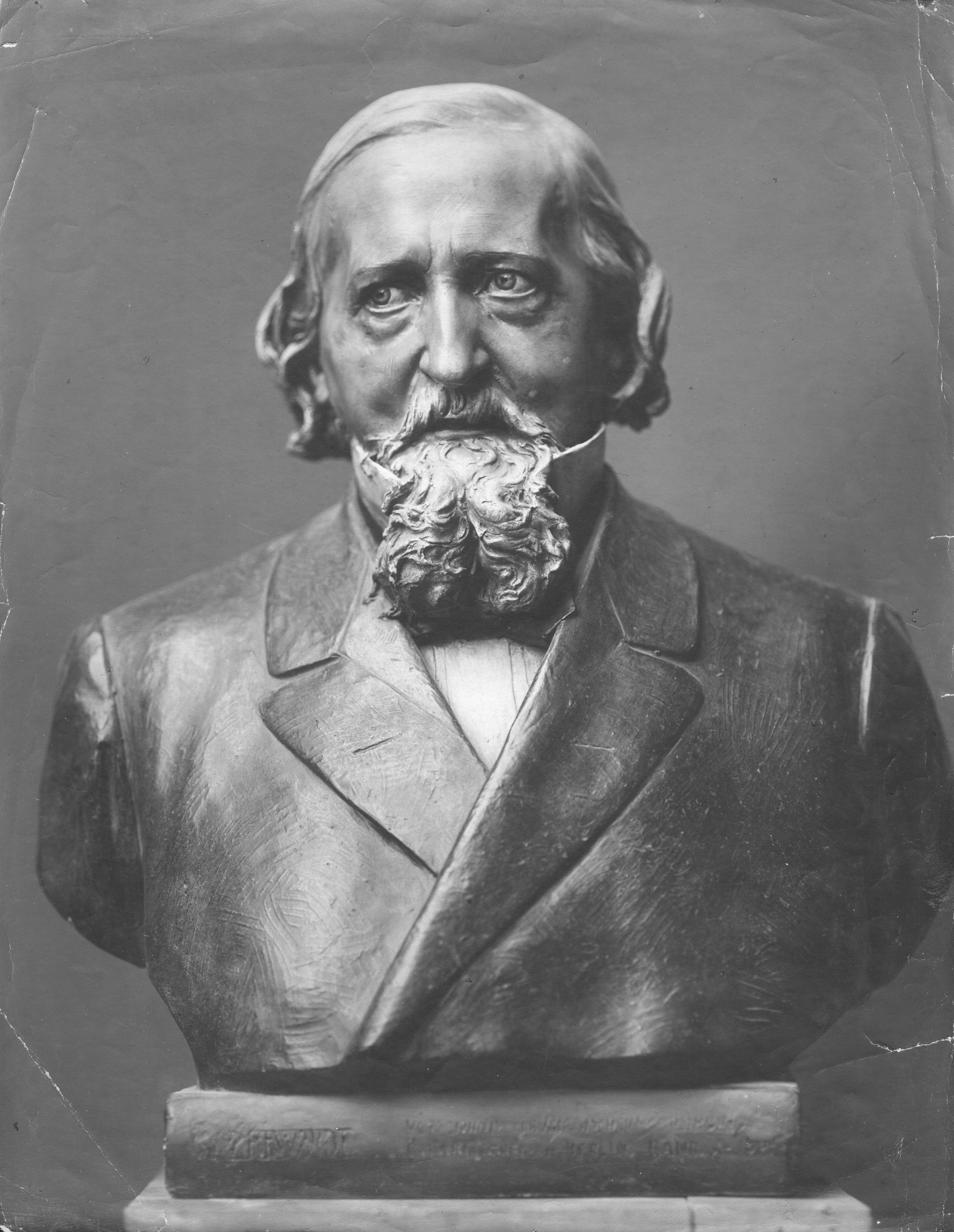
- Born: July 4, 1828; Greifswald, Prussia
- Died: November 2, 1909 (aged 81); Greifswald, Prussia, German, Empire

Academic background
- Education: University of Greifswald; University of Göttingen

Academic work
- Discipline: Oriental studies
- Institutions: University of Greifswald

Wilhelm Ahlwardt (4 July 1828 in Greifswald – 2 November 1909 in Greifswald) was a German orientalist who specialized in research of Arabic literature. He was the son of philologist Christian Wilhelm Ahlwardt (1760–1830).

== Biography ==
He studied oriental philology at the University of Greifswald (1846–48, 1849–50) as a student of Johann Gottfried Ludwig Kosegarten and at the University of Göttingen (1848–49) under Heinrich Ewald. After graduation, he spent several years studying Arab manuscripts in libraries at Gotha and Paris. In 1856 he began work as an assistant librarian at Greifswald, obtaining his habilitation during the following year. In 1861 he became a professor at the university.

== Published works ==
His main work was the masterful Verzeichnis der arabischen Handschriften (1887–1899), a 10 volume catalogue of Arabic manuscripts kept at the Royal Library of Berlin. As a dedication to the 400 year jubilee of the university at Greifswald (1856), he published Über Poesie und Poetik der Araber ("On Poetry and Poetics of the Arabs"). Other principal works by Ahlwardt are:

- Chalef elahmar's Qasside: Berichtigter arabischer Text, 1859 – (Khalaf al-Aḥmar's qasida).
- "The divans of the six ancient Arabic poets Ennabiga, 'Antara, Tharafa, Zuhair, 'Alqama and Imruulqais", Trübner & co., London, 1870 (in English).
- Al-Fakhrî by Muḥammad ibn ʻAlī Ibn al-Ṭiqṭaqā (Paris, É. Bouillon, 1895).
