= Christian Wilhelm Ahlwardt =

German classical philologist

Christian Wilhelm Ahlwardt (23 November 1760 in Greifswald – 12 April 1830 in Greifswald) was a German classical philologist. He was the father of orientalist Wilhelm Ahlwardt (1828–1909).

After obtaining his habilitation from the University of Rostock, he worked as a schoolteacher in the town of Demmin (from 1792). In 1795 he was named academic rector in Anklam, followed by a rectorship at the Oldenburg gymnasium (from 1797). In 1811 he was named rector of the gymnasium in Greifswald, and in 1817 he became a professor of ancient literature at the University of Greifswald, where he remained until his death.

== Principal works ==
- Zur Erklärung der Idyllen Theokrits, 1792 – Explanation of the Idylls of Theocritus.
- Kallimachos Hymnen und Epigrammen, 1794 – Callimachus' hymns and epistles.
- Lodovico Ariosto's Satyren, 1794 – Lodovico Ariosto's "Satyren".
- Der Attis des Catullus, 1808 – The Attis by Catullus.
- Die Gedichte Ossians, 1811 – The poetry of Ossian.
- Pindari Carmina, cvm fragmentis, 1820 – an edition of Pindar.
