= Heinrich Thorbecke =

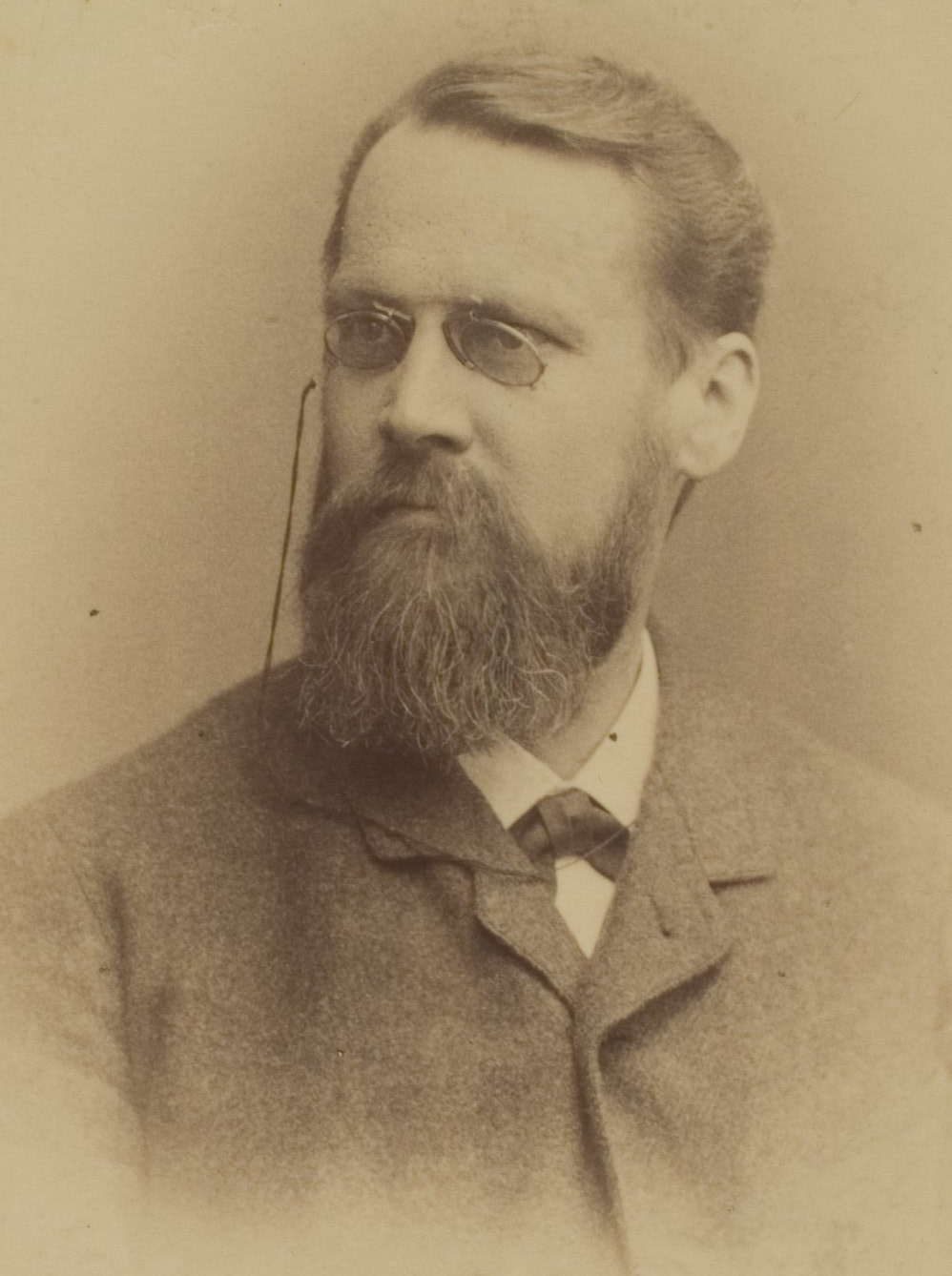
Heinrich Thorbecke.

Andreas Heinrich Thorbecke (14 March 1837 in Meiningen – 3 January 1890 in Mannheim) was a German Arabic scholar. His studies were dedicated mainly to the poetry of the Bedouin and the history of Arabic.

== Biography ==
He studied at the Ludwig-Maximilians-Universität München and Leipzig University, where he was a pupil of Heinrich Leberecht Fleischer. In 1873, he was appointed an associate professor at Heidelberg University, then relocated to the University of Halle in 1885, where he attained a full professorship in 1887.

== Works ==
- Antarah, ein vorislamitischer Dichter (Life of Antarah, the Pre-Islamite Poet, 1867).
- Al-Harīri's Durrat-al-gawwas (1871); edition of Al-Hariri.
- Al-A'schā's Lobgedicht auf Mahammed (Al Ashâ's Song of Praise to Mohammed, 1875)
- Ibn Duraid's Kitāb al-malāhin (1882); edition of Ibn Duraid.
- Die Mufad-dali-jāt (The Mufaddaaliyyat, 1885).
- Mihail Sabbag's Grammatik der arabischen Umgangssprache in Syrien und Aegypten (M. Sabbâg's Grammar of Conversational Arabic in Syria and Egypt, 1886).
