= Hamasah =

Genre of Arabic poetry

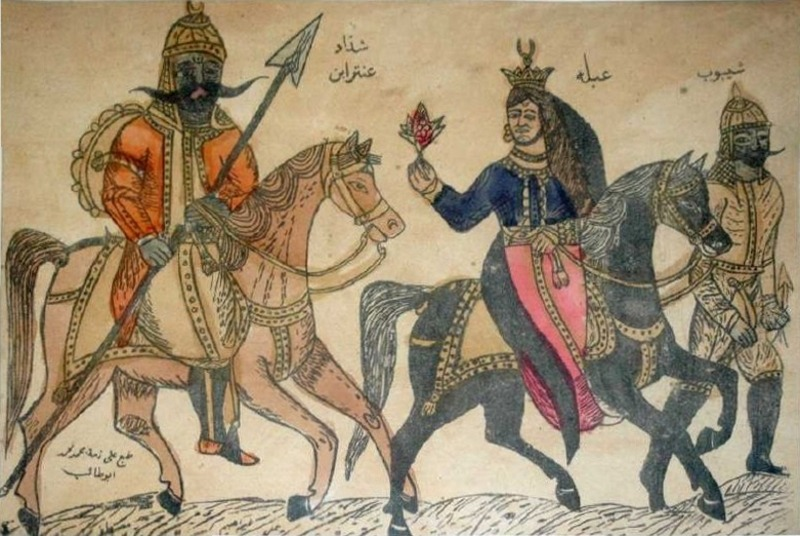

The Hamasah (Arabic: حماسة; lit. 'Valour') is a genre of Arabic poetry that "recounts chivalrous exploits in the context of military glories and victories".

The first work in this genre is Kitab al-Hamasah of Abu Tammam.

== Hamasah works ==
List of popular Hamasah works:

- Hamasah of Abu Tammam.
- Al-Waḥshiyyāt (Book of Stray Verses) or al-Ḥamāsah al-ṣughrā (The Lesser Ḥamāsah) by Abu Tammam.
- Al-Buhturi compiled a Hamasah that is divided into 174 abwab.
- Ḥamāsat al-ẓurafāʾ (Poems of the Refined and Witty) by Al-ʿAbdalkānī al-Zawzanī (d. 431/1039).
- Al-Ḥamāsah al-Shajariyyah of Ibn al-Shajarī (d. 542/1148)
- Al-Ḥamāsah al-Maghribiyyah by Aḥmad b. ʿAbd al-Salām al-Jurāwī (d. 609/1212)
- Al-Ḥamāsah al-Baṣriyyah by Ṣadr al-Dīn ʿAlī b. Abī l-Faraj al-Baṣrī (d. probably 659/1249)
- Al-Ḥamāsah al-saʿdiyyah (known also as al-Tadhkirah al-saʿdiyyah) by al-ʿUbaydī (d. eighth/fourteenth century)

Lost works:

- Ḥamāsah of Ibn al-Marzubān (d. 309/921).
- Al-Ḥamāsah al-muḥdathah (The Modern Ḥamāsah) by Ibn Fāris (d. 395/1004).
- Abū Hilāl al-ʿAskarī known to have compiled a Ḥamāsah.
- Al-Shantamarī (d. 476/1083) wrote a Ḥamāsah that is not to be confused with his commentary on the Ḥamāsah of Abū Tammām.
- Al-Shāṭibī (d. 547/1152) compiled a Ḥamāsah.
- Abū al-Ḥajjāj Yūsuf b. Muḥammad b. Ibrāhīm al-Anṣārī al-Bayyāsī (d. 653/1255) compiled a Ḥamāsah.
- Ḥamāsat al-muḥdathīn (The Ḥamāsah of the Modern Poets) by * Abū Bakr Muḥammad b. Hāshim al-Khālidī (d. 380/990) and Abū ʿUthmān Saʿīd b. Hāshim (d. 390/999).
- Ḥamāsah by an unknown Abū Dimāsh
