= Adi ibn Zayd =

6th-century Arab Christian poet

- عَدِيُّ بْنُ زَيْدٍ العِبَادِيُّ التَمِيمِيُ
- Born: c. 550; Al-Hirah
- Died: c. 600
- Occupation: Poet
- Spouse: Hind

Adi ibn Zayd al-Ibadi al-Tamimi (Arabic: عَدِيُّ بْنُ زَيْدٍ العِبَادِيُّ التَمِيمِيُ, romanized: ʿAdī ibn Zayd al-ʿIbādī al-Tamīmī; c. 550-600) was a 6th-century Arab Christian poet from an Ibadi family of al-Hirah.

== Biography ==
Adi ibn Zayd was born around the year 550 CE in al-Hirah. He was of Tamim descent and came from a Christian family that had migrated from Yemen to al-Hirah. His grandfather and father served the Lakhmid dynasty, which was under the rule of the Sasanian Empire. Adi received his education at the Sasanian court in Mada’in, where he also learned Persian. According to Arab sources, he spoke Arabic and Persian and it is likely that as a Nestorian Christian he also spoke Syriac. Like his father, Adi ibn Zayd was influenced by Persian culture and served as the secretary (dabir) for Arab affairs under the Sasanian king Hormizd IV (r. 579–590) and later Khosrow II (r. 590–628). It seems that he went to Constantinople in 579 by order of the Sasanian king and brought from there several books. Adi ibn Zayd spent much of his life in the courts of Al-Hirah and Mada’in.

He was married to the granddaughter of the Lakhmid ruler al-Nu'man III ibn al-Mundhir (r. 580–602), and is said to have helped al-Nu'man accede to power as ruler of al-Hirah. He is featured in Adî ibn Zayd and the Princess Hind, a tale in the Arabian Nights.

However, his growing influence sparked jealousy among rivals at the court, who accused him of prioritizing Persian interests over those of the Arabs. This led to his downfall, as Nu'man III ultimately ordered his imprisonment and later had him executed by strangulation around the year 600. It is believed that Adi ibn Zayd’s death worsened relations between the Sasanians and the Lakhmids, contributing to the eventual decline of the Lakhmid dynasty.

== Work ==
Contrary to other poets at the courts of the Arab kings such as Al-Nabigha, no panegyrics by Adi ibn Zayd have been preserved, possibly because his family was already well-known and he therefore did not need to charm the rulers. Preserved are poems on wine, prison, scolding errors of his youth as well as a historical ballad on the defeat of queen Zenobia by the founder of the Lakhmid dynasty, Amr ibn Adi. Among his poems is also one dealing with the biblical creation narrative.

== Legacy ==
Adi ibn Zayd grew up in an environment influenced by foreign cultures, far from the traditional Bedouin way of life. Because of this, scholars of the 2nd and 3rd centuries of the Hijra did not think his language was pure enough, so they did not include his poetry as examples in their works. This is why his poems were excluded from the famous anthologies compiled by Mufaddal and Asmai. His poetry often dealt with the fleeting nature of worldly life, and it is believed that he had an influence on later poets. Adi used a simple and accessible language.

The manuscripts of his diwan, compiled by the 3rd-century of the Hijra philologist Sukkari, have not survived. However, Louis Cheikho gathered around 400 bayts of Adi from various sources in his work. Later, the diwan itself was discovered and published in Baghdad in 1965. However, both among the bayts collected by Cheikho and those in the diwan, there are lines whose authenticity is questionable.

== Sources ==
- Francesco Gabrieli, "ʿAdī ibn Zaid, il poeta di al-Ḥīrah", in: Rendiconti dell'Accademia Nazionale dei Lincei, classe di scienze morali, serie VIII, vol. I (1946), pp. 81-96 (in Italian).
- Rajabzadeh, Hashem (1993). "Dabīr". Encyclopaedia Iranica, Vol. VI, Fasc. 5. pp. 534–539.
- Seidensticker, Tilman (2009). "ʿAdī b. Zayd". In Fleet, Kate; Krämer, Gudrun; Matringe, Denis; Nawas, John; Rowson, Everett (eds.). Encyclopaedia of Islam (3rd ed.). Brill Online. doi:10.1163/1573-3912_ei3_COM_22804. ISSN 1873-9830.
- Toral-Niehoff, Isabel (2008). "Eine arabische poetische Gestaltung des Sündenfalls: Das vorislamische Schöpfungsgedicht des ʿAdî b. Zayd". In Hartwig, Dirk; Homolka, Walter; Marx, Michael J.; Neuwirth, Angelika (eds.). Im vollen Licht der Geschichte”: Die Wissenschaft des Judentums und die Anfänge der kritischen Koranforschung (PDF) (in German). Würzburg: Ergon. pp. 235–256. ISBN 978-3899134780.
