= Al-A'sha =

Pre-Islamic Arabian poet

- Born: Maymun Ibn Qays Al-A'sha c. 570; Al-Yamama, Arabia
- Died: c. 625; Durnā, Arabia
- Occupation: Poet
- Writing career
- Language: Arabic
- Period: Pre-Islamic
- Genres: Panegyrics, Love poetry
- Notable work: Mu'allaqat

Al-A'sha (Arabic: ٱلْأَعْشَىٰ) or Maymun Ibn Qays Al-A'sha (d.c. 570– 625) was an Arabic Pre-Islamic poet from Al-Yamama, Arabia. He claimed to receive inspiration from a jinni called Misḥal. Although not a Christian himself, his poems prove familiarity with Christianity.

He traveled through Mesopotamia, Syria, Arabia and Ethiopia. He was nicknamed al-A'sha which means "weak-sighted" or "night-blind" after he lost his sight. He continued to travel even after becoming blind, particularly along the western coast of the Arabian peninsula. It was then that he turned to the writing of panegyrics as a means of support. His style, reliant on sound effects and full-bodied foreign words, tends to be artificial.

His love poems are devoted to the praise of Huraira, a black female slave. He is said to have believed in the Christian eschatological themes of Resurrection and Last Judgment, and to have been a monotheist. These beliefs may have been due to his interactions with the bishop of Najrān and the 'Ibādites of Al-Hirah. His poems were praised for their descriptions of the wild ass, for the praise of wine, for their skill in praise and satire, and for the varieties of metre employed.

Philip F. Kennedy writes of Al-A'sha's love of wine that: (Note: Abu Nuwas: A Genius of Poetry (2005), Philip F. Kennedy: "It is said that he almost converted to Islam in 629 but fell just short of the act, dissuaded at the last minute upon finding out, already on route to visit Muhammad, about the Islamic proscription of wine.") (Note: The Development of Tropes in Arabic Wine Poetry up to the 12th Century AD (2019), Nader Masarwah: "Al-A'sha occupied himself considerably with wine, so much so that it has been given as the reason for his refusal to convert to Islam.")

It is said that he almost converted to Islam in 629 but fell just short of the act, dissuaded at the last minute upon finding out, already on route to visit Muhammad, about the Islamic proscription of wine.

One of his qasidah or odes is sometimes included in the Mu'allaqat, an early collection of Arabic poetry.
