= Kitab al-Aghani =

Arabic encyclopedic collection of poems and songs

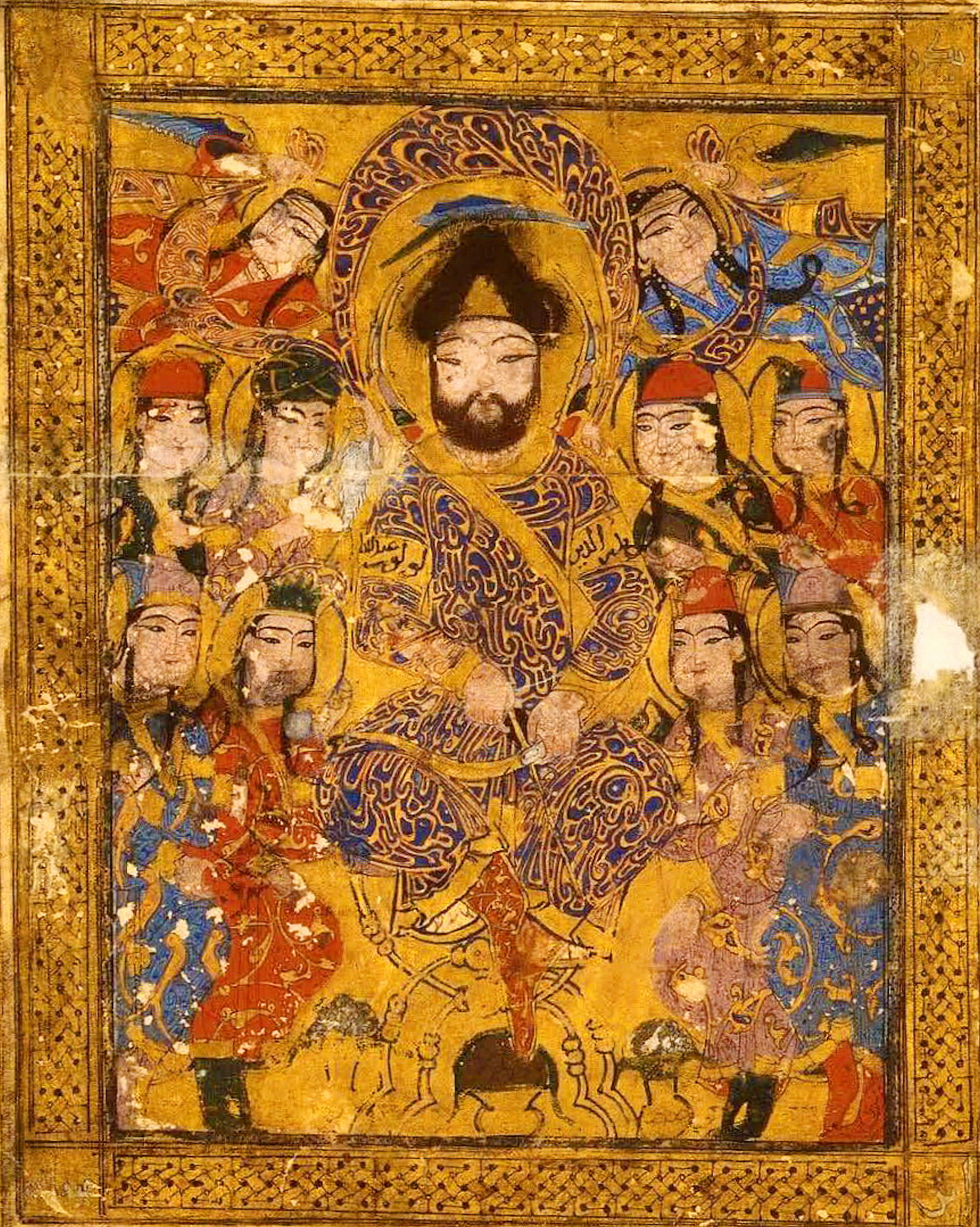
- Illustration from Kitab al-Aghani (1216-20)
- Author: Abu al-Faraj al-Isfahani
- Original title: كتاب الأغاني
- Language: Arabic
- Subject: Arabic poetry and songs
- Genre: Encyclopedic collection
- Published: 10th century
- Publication place: Abbasid Caliphate
- Media type: Manuscript
- Pages: Over 10,000

Kitāb al-Aghānī (Arabic: كتاب الأغاني, romanized: kitāb al-‘aghānī, lit. 'The Book of Songs'), is an encyclopedic collection of poems and songs that runs to over 20 volumes in modern editions, attributed to the 10th-century Arabic writer Abū al-Farāj al-Isfahānī (also known as al-Isbahānī).

== Content ==
Abū al-Farāj claimed to have taken 50 years in writing the work, which ran to over 10,000 pages and contains more than 16,000 verses of Arabic poetry. It can be seen as having three distinct sections: the first deals with the '100 Best Songs' chosen for the caliph Harūn al-Rashīd, the second with royal composers, and the third with songs chosen by the author himself. It spans the period from pre-Islamic times to the end of the 9th century CE. Abu al-Faraj importantly included performance directions for many of the songs included in Kitāb al-Aghānī. Due to the accompanying biographical annotations on the personages, the work is an important historical and historiographical source; it is also useful for those interested in the sociology of Arabic literature.

== Reception ==
The 14th-century historian Ibn Khaldūn called The Book of Songs the register of the Arabs: "It comprises all that they had achieved in past of excellence in every kind of poetry, history, music, etc. So far as I am aware, no other book can be put on a level with it in this respect. It is the final resource of the student of belles lettres and leaves him nothing further to be desired".

== Manuscripts ==
The earliest known manuscript dates to 1131, and is located in the Feyzullah Library, Istanbul. It is without miniatures.

=== Illustrated manuscript (1217–1219) ===
The second known manuscript is dated to the 13th century, with some of the volumes inscribed to the year 1217. The manuscript comprises 20 volumes, four of them now being in the Egyptian National Library in Cairo (II, IV, XI, XIII), and two more in the Feyzullah Library, Istanbul (XVII, XIX). It had several miniatures, only six of which have remained. This edition was made in Mosul in around 1218–19 for the Zengid dynasty Governor Badr al-Dīn Lū'lū', who appears prominently in several of the miniatures. Six of the twenty volumes have frontispieces, with no other illustrations.

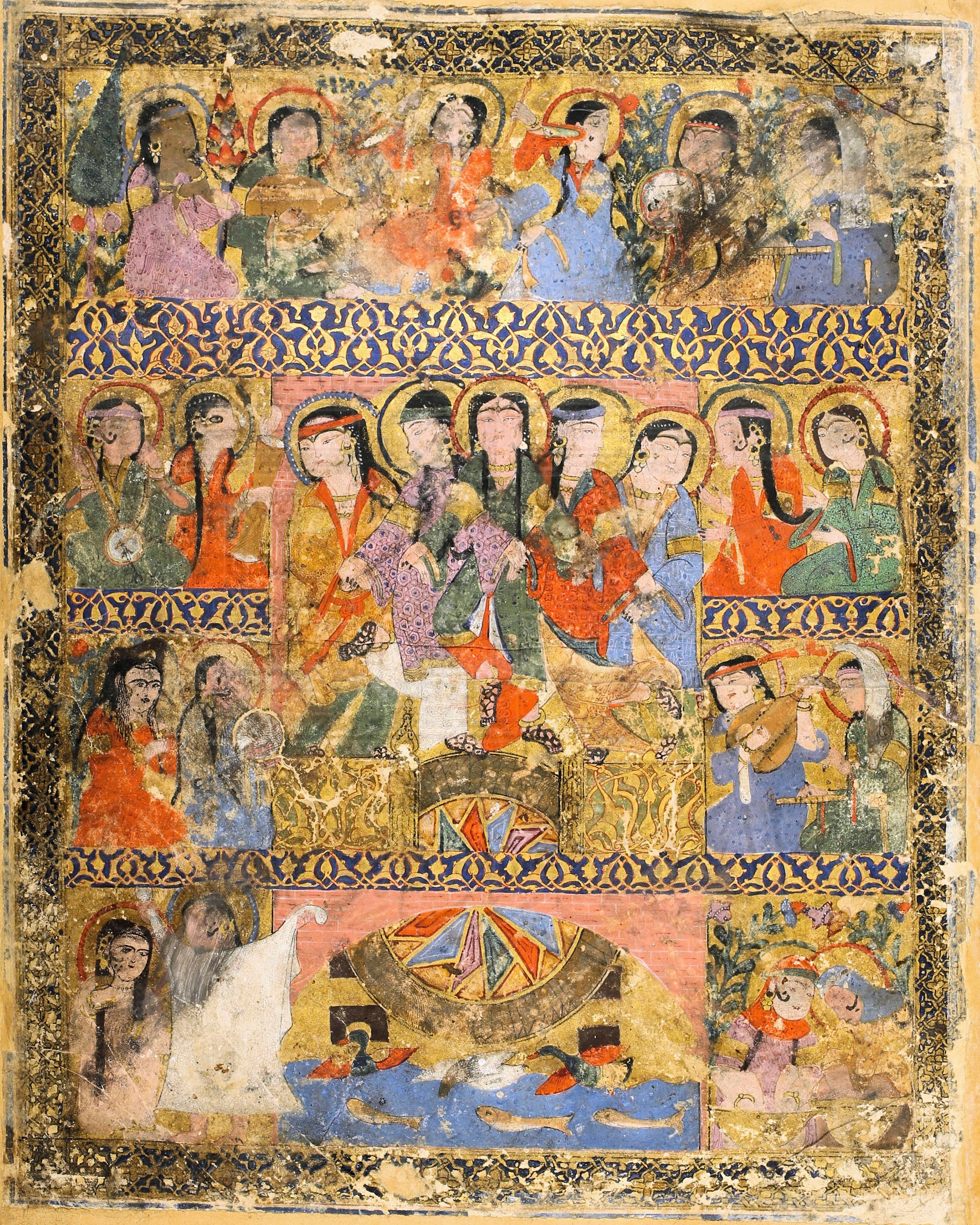
Female attendants, dancing and bathing at the court. Kitāb al-aghānī, Mosul, 1218–1219. Vol II. Cairo, Egyptian National Library, Ms Farsi 579

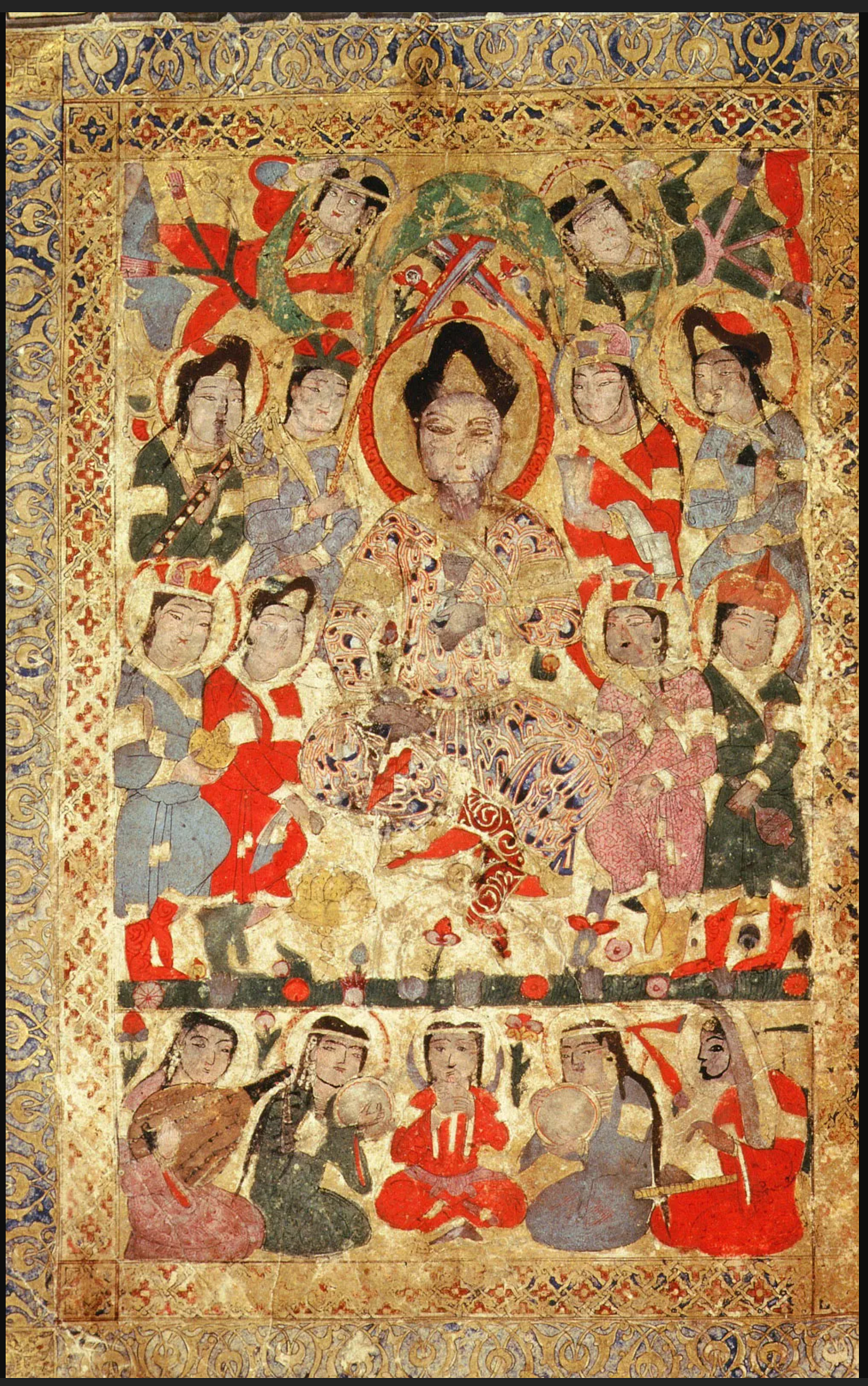
Kitāb al-aghānī, Mosul, 1218–1219. Vol IV. Cairo, Egyptian National Library, Ms Farsi 579

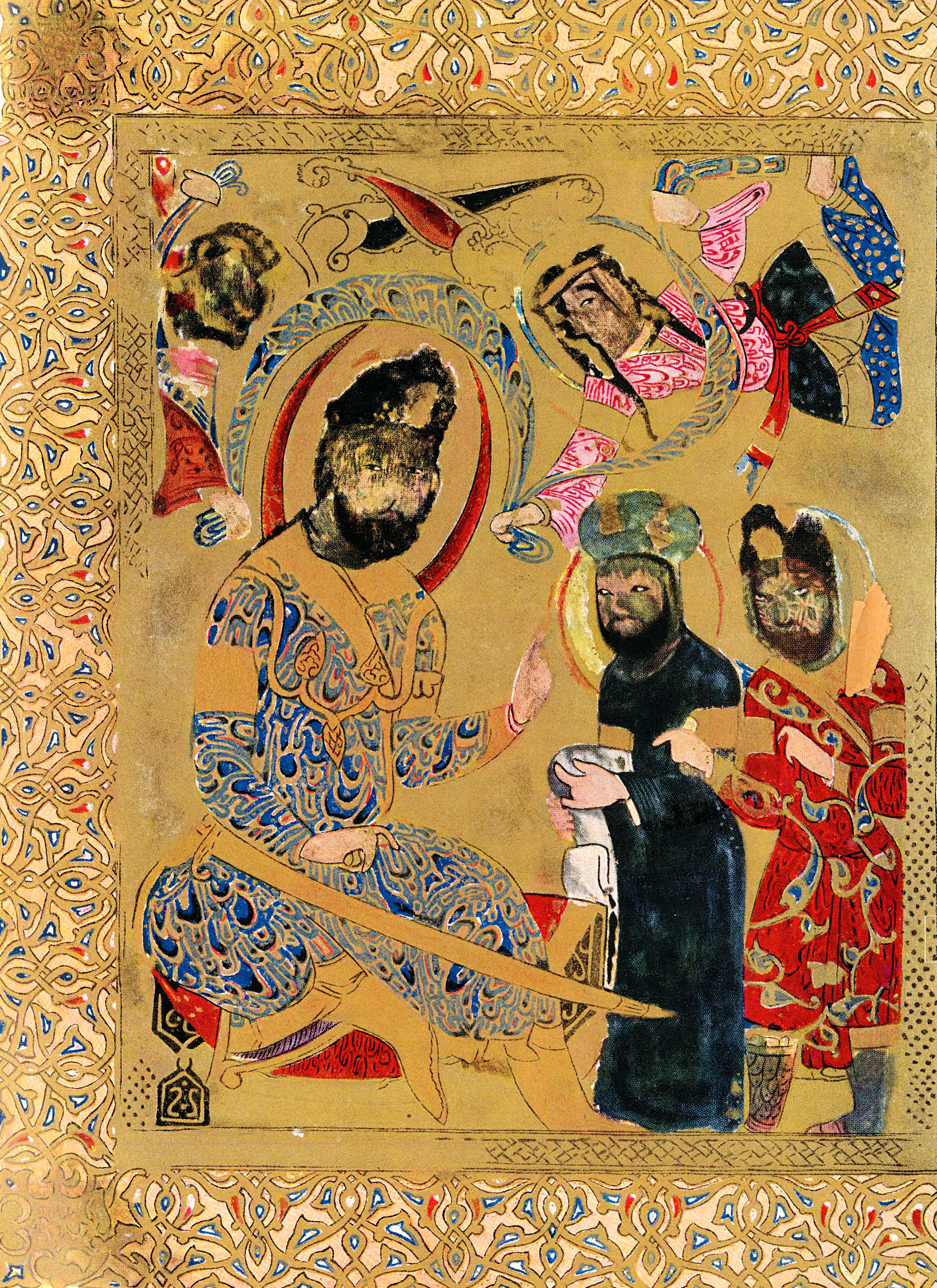
Kitāb al-aghānī, Mosul, 1218–1219. Vol XI. Cairo, Egyptian National Library, Ms Farsi 579

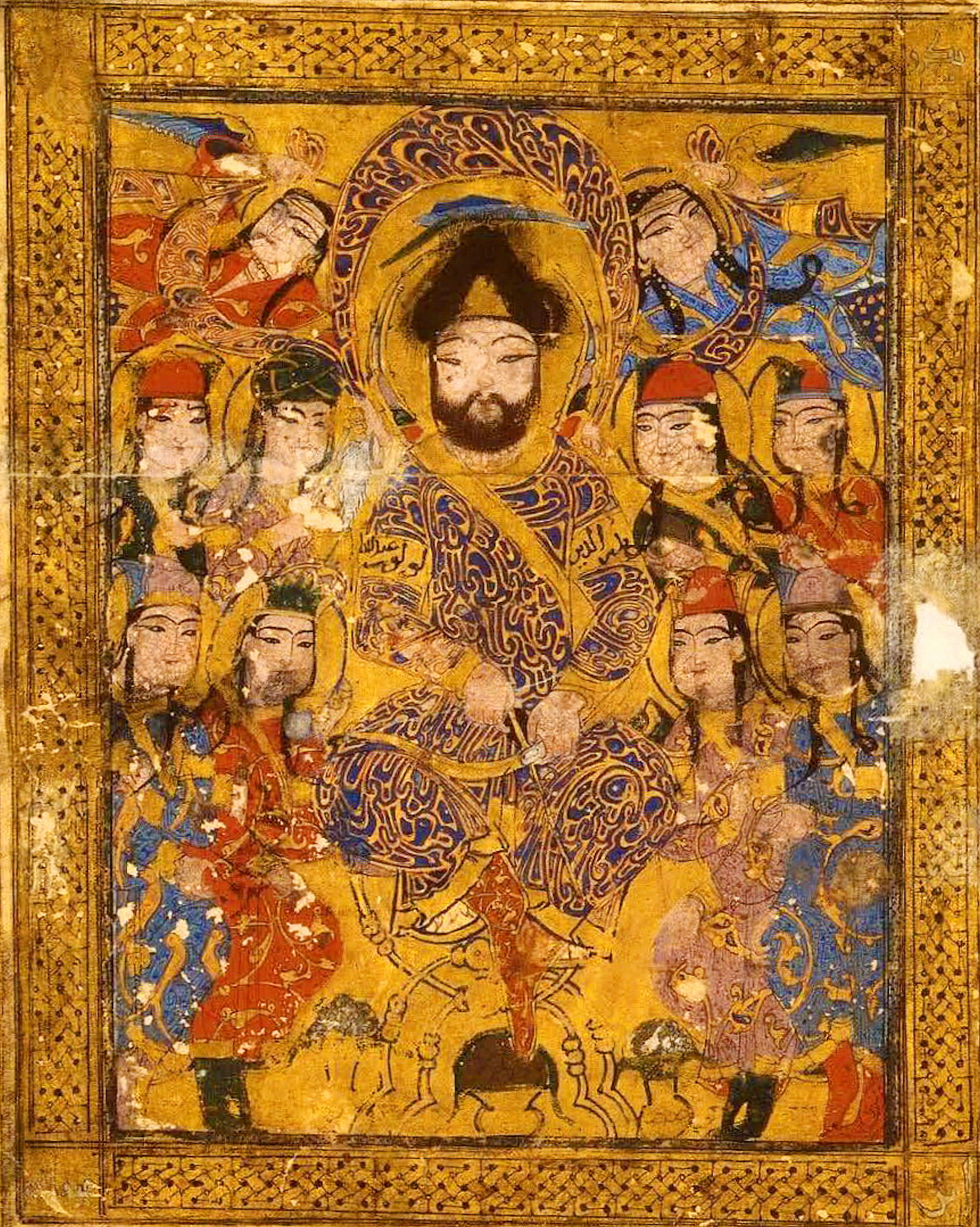
Kitāb al-aghānī, Mosul, 1218–1219. Vol XVII. Istanbul, Millet Library, Ms Feyzullah Efendi 1566.

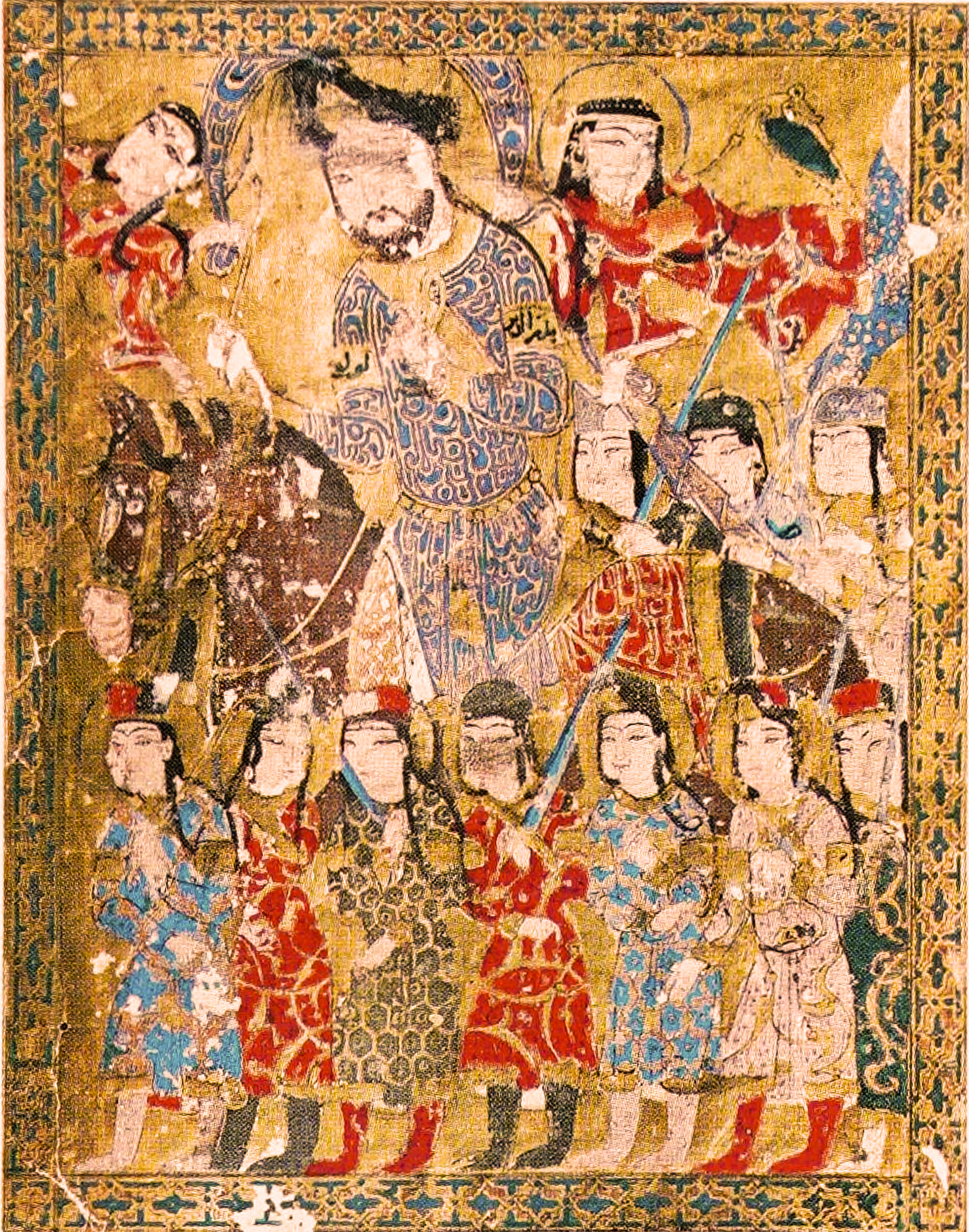
Kitāb al-aghānī, Mosul, 1218–1219. Vol XIX. Istanbul, Millet Library, Ms Feyzullah Efendi 1565

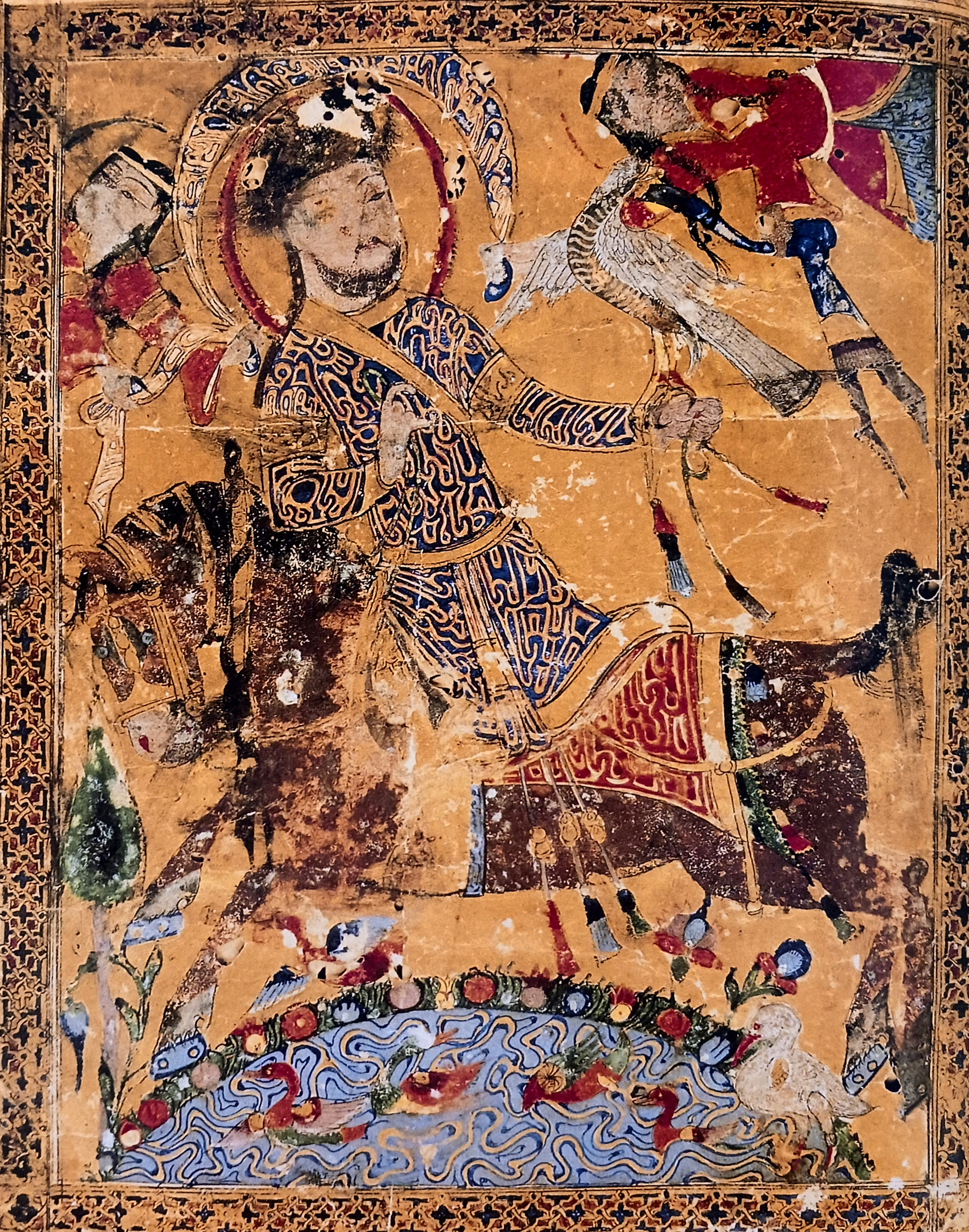
Kitāb al-aghānī, Mosul, 1218–1219. Vol XX. David Collection, Copenhagen, Denmark

== Modern editions ==
- al-Iṣbahānī, Abū al-Faraj ‘Alī ibn al-Ḥusayn (1900). Kitāb al-Aghāni (in Arabic). Vol. 1–7.
- al-Iṣbahānī, Abū al-Faraj ‘Alī ibn al-Ḥusayn (1900). Kitāb al-Aghāni (in Arabic). Vol. 8–14.
- al-Iṣbahānī, Abū al-Faraj ‘Alī ibn al-Ḥusayn (1900). Kitāb al-Aghāni (in Arabic). Vol. 15–21.
- al-Iṣbahānī, Abū al-Faraj ‘Alī ibn al-Ḥusayn (1900). Kitāb al-Aghāni (in Arabic). Vol. 22.
- al-Iṣbahānī, Abū al-Faraj ‘Alī ibn al-Ḥusayn (1868). Kitāb al-Aghāni. Vol. 21. Leiden: Brill.
- al-Iṣbahānī, Abū al-Faraj ‘Alī ibn al-Ḥusayn (1900). Tables alphabétiques (Kitāb al-Aghāni). Leiden: Brill.
- al-Iṣfahīnī, Abū al-Faraj. Kitāb al-Aghānī; 21 parts & Index in 9 vols., equiv. to Cairo ed., 1322/1905–5. Dār al-Fikr.
- al-Iṣfahīnī, Abū al-Faraj (2004). Kitāb al-Aghānī. Vol. 25. Beirut: Dar Sader Publishers.

== See also ==
- Abu al-Faraj al-Isfahani
- Hamasah
- Imru' al-Qais
- Maqama
- Mu'allaqat
- Mufaddaliyat
