= Al-Mufaddal ad-Dabbi =

Arabic philologist of the Kufan school

al-Mufaddal ad-Dabbi
- Born: Kufa, Iraq
- Died: c. 780–787
- Occupations: Philologist, Poet
- Writing career
- Language: Arabic
- Notable work: Mufaddaliyat

Al-Mufaddal ibn Muhammad ibn Ya'la ibn 'Amir ibn Salim ibn ar-Rammal ad-Dabbi, commonly known as al-Mufaḍḍal aḍ-Ḍabbī (Arabic: المُفَضَّل الضَّبِي), died c. 780–787, was an Arabic philologist of the Kufan school. Al-Mufaddal was a contemporary of Hammad ar-Rawiya and Khalaf al-Ahmar, the famous collectors of early and pre-Islamic Arabic poetry and tradition, and was somewhat the junior of Abu 'Amr ibn al-'Ala', the first scholar who systematically set himself to preserve the poetic literature of the Arabs. He died about fifty years before Abu ʿUbaidah and al-Asma'i, to whose labours posterity is largely indebted for the arrangement, elucidation and criticism of ancient Arabian verse; and his anthology was put together between fifty and sixty years before the compilation by Abu Tammam of the Hamasah.

== Life ==
The exact year of al-Mufaddal's birth is not known, though his father was an authority on the Muslim conquest of Persia and it is thought that al-Mufaddal was born in that region.

Al-Mufaddal lived for many years under the caliphs of the Umayyad line until their overthrow by the Abbasid Revolution in 750. In 762 he took part in the rising led by Ibrahim ibn Abdallah, the Alid, called "The Pure Soul", against the caliph al-Mansur, and after the defeat and death of Ibrahim was cast into prison. Al-Mansur, however, pardoned him on the intercession of his fellow tribesman Musayyab ibn Zuhair of Dabba, and appointed him the instructor in literature of his son, afterwards the caliph al-Mahdi. It was for this prince that, at al-Mansur's instigation, al-Mufaddal compiled the Mufaddaliyat.

Al-Mufaddal's exact date of death has proved difficult to determine. The Encyclopedia of Arabic Literature states that he died some time around the year 780, though the longer window between 781 and 787 has been claimed as well.

== Work ==
Al-Mufaddal was a careful and trustworthy collector both of texts and traditions, and is praised by all authorities on Arabian history and literature as in this respect greatly the superior of Hammad and Khalaf, who are accused (especially the latter) of unscrupulous fabrication of poems in the style of the ancients. He was a native of Kufa, the northernmost of the two great military colonies founded in 638 by the caliph Umar for the control of the wide Mesopotamian plain. In Kufa and Basra were gathered representatives of all the Arabian tribes who formed the fighting force of the Islamic Empire, and from these al-Mufaddal was able to collect and record the compositions of the poets who had celebrated the fortunes and exploits of their forefathers. He, no doubt, like al-Asma'i and Abu Ubaida, also himself visited the areas occupied by the tribes for their camping grounds in the neighbouring desert; and adjacent to Kufah was al-Hira (modern al-Kufah), the ancient capital of the Lakhmids kings, whose court was the most celebrated centre in pre-Islamic Arabia, where, in the century before the preaching of the Prophet, poets from the whole of the northern half of the peninsula were wont to assemble. There is indeed a tradition that a written collection (diwan) existed in the family of Nu'man III ibn al-Mundhir, the last Lakhmid king, containing a number of poems by the fuhul, or most eminent poets of the pagan time, and especially by those who had praised the princes of the house, and that this collection passed into the possession of the Umayyad caliphs of the house of Marwan; to this, if the tradition is to be believed, al-Mufaddal probably had access.

After his death, al-Mufaddal's students were responsible for compiling and publishing his famous anthology on his behalf.
