= Al-Harith ibn Hilliza al-Yashkuri =

Arabian poet

- Born: Al-Ḥārith ibn Ḥilliza al-Yashkurī; 6th century Arabia
- Occupations: Poet, Warrior
- Writing career
- Language: Arabic
- Period: Pre-Islamic era
- Genre: Poetry
- Notable work: Mu'allaqat

Al-Ḥārith ibn Ḥilliza al-Yashkurī (Arabic: الحارث بن حلزة اليشكري) was a pre-Islamic Arabian poet of the tribe of Bakr, from the 6th century. He was the author of one of the seven famous pre-Islamic poems known as the Mu'allaqat. Little is known of the details of his life.

The story of the mu'allaqa which al-Harith composed is as follows. A dispute had arisen between the men of Taghlib and those of Bakr after a number of young Taghlib men had died in the desert. The men of Taghlib chose their prince, Amr ibn Kulthum, to plead their cause before Amr ibn Hind (d. 569), the king of al-Hirah in southern Iraq. Ibn Kulthum pleaded the Taghlib's cause by reciting the sixth of the mu'allaqāt. A quarrel then broke out between Ibn Kulthum and al-Nu'man, the Bakr spokesman, as a result of which the king dismissed them both and asked al-Harith to act as spokesman for the Bakr tribe instead of al-Nu'man. Whereupon, al-Harith recited the seventh mu'allaqa. It is said that al-Harith was an old man by this time, and afflicted with leprosy, so that he was required to recite his poem from behind a curtain. He is said to have been of noble birth and a warrior.

Although the mu'allaqa is mostly a plea, interspersed with flattery of King Amr, it begins conventionally in the usual style of a qasida with a brief section of regret for a lost love and a description of a flight by camel. The metre is khafīf.

Of al-Harith's other poems only a few fragments remain.
