= Zuhayr bin Abi Sulma =

Islamic Arabian poet

- Born: c. 520; Najd region, Arabia
- Died: c. 609; Najd region, Arabia
- Occupation: Poet
- Children: Ka'b bin Zuhayr, Bujayr bin Zuhayr
- Writing career
- Language: Arabic
- Notable work: Mu'allaqat (The Suspended Odes)

Zuhayr bin Abī Sulmā (Arabic: زهير بن أبي سلمى; c. 520 – c. 609), also romanized as Zuhair or Zoheir, was a pre-Islamic Arabian poet who lived in the 6th & 7th centuries AD. He is considered one of the greatest writers of Arabic poetry in pre-Islamic times. Zuhayr belonged to the Banu Muzaina. His father was a poet and his elder son Ka'b bin Zuhayr also became a poet, reading his works to the Islamic prophet Muhammad.

Zuhayr's poems can be found in Hammad Ar-Rawiya's anthology, the Mu'allaqat ("the Suspended"), a collection of pre-Islamic poetry. He was one of the seven poets featured in that collection who were reputed to have been honoured by hanging copies of their work in the Kaaba at Mecca. He was Umar ibn al-Khattab's favourite poet.

Zuhayr's poetry was written when two Arabic tribes ended a longstanding hostility. His poems deal with raids and other subjects of nomadic desert life. He also wrote satirical poems and poems about the glory of his tribe, but in his verses he was less satiric than most of his brother poets. He strove to express deep thoughts in simple words, to be clear and by his clear phrases to teach his people high and noble ideas. He was a man of rank and wealth, the foremost of a family noted for their poetic skill and religious earnestness.

== Cultural reception ==
Zuhayr's poetry inspired Saudi land artist Zahrah al Ghamdi's 2018 installation After Illusion which was shown as part of the Venice Biennale.
