= Abu Ali al-Marzuqi =

Abū ʿAlī Aḥmad b. Muḥammad b. al-Ḥasan al-Marzūqī, best known as Abu Ali al-Marzuqi (died 1030 AD/c. 421 AH), was an Iranian literary critic, grammarian and lexicographer who wrote in Arabic. He was born in Isfahan and studied Sibawayh's famous work on grammar, the al-Kitab, under the noted grammar expert Abu Ali al-Farisi.
