= Alqama al-Fahl =

Arabian poet

- علقمة بن عبدة
- Born: Alqama ibn 'Ubada c. 6th century Arabia
- Died: c. 6th century Arabia
- Occupation: Poet
- Writing career
- Language: Arabic
- Period: Pre-Islamic
- Genres: Elegies, Fragments
- Notable work: Diwan

'Alqama ibn 'Ubada, (Arabic: علقمة بن عبدة), generally known as 'Alqama al-Fahl (علقمة الفحل), was an Arabian poet of the tribe Tamim, who flourished in the second half of the 6th century.

The name al-Fahl literally means "the stallion" which he became known by when won a poetic contest against Imru' al-Qais. Imru's wife thought that he completely surpassed Imru in that contest, so Imru divorced her and then 'Alqama married her. What happened became so popular in the peninsula and people started calling him "The Stallion". His poetic description of ostriches is said to have been famous among the Arabs. His diwan consists of three qasidas (elegies) and eleven fragments. Asma'i considered three of the poems genuine.

The poems were edited by Albert Socin with Latin translation as Die Gedichte des 'Alkama Alfahl (Leipzig, 1867), and are contained in Wilhelm Ahlwardt's The Diwans of the six ancient Arabic Poets (London, 1870); cf. Ahlwardt's Bemerkungen über die Echtheit der alten arabischen Gedichte (Greifswald, 1872), pp. 65–71 and 146–168.
