= Labid =

Arabian poet (died c.660)

- Born: Abū Aqīl Labīd ibn Rabīʿa ibn Mālik al-ʿĀmirī c. 560; Higher Nejd, Arabia
- Died: c. 661
- Occupations: Poet, Warrior
- Writing career
- Language: Arabic
- Period: Pre-Islamic and Islamic eras
- Genre: Poetry
- Notable work: Mu'allaqat

Abū Aqīl Labīd ibn Rabīʿa ibn Mālik al-ʿĀmirī (Arabic: أبو عقيل لَبيد بن ربيعة بن مالك العامِري; c. 560 – c. 661) was an Arab poet from higher Nejd and a companion of the Islamic prophet Muhammad.

He belonged to the Bani Amir, a division of the tribe of the Hawazin. In his younger years he was an active warrior, and his verse is largely concerned with inter-tribal disputes. Later, he was sent by a sick uncle to get a remedy from Muhammad at Medina and on this occasion was much influenced by a part of the Quran's, shortest Surah, 'Al-Kawthar'. He accepted Islam soon after. One of his poems is contained in the Mu'allaqat.

His muruwwa (virtue) is highlighted in the story that he vowed to feed people whenever the east wind began to blow, and to continue so doing until it stopped. Al-Walid 'Uqba, leader of the Kuffa, sent him one hundred camels to enable him to keep his vow.

In an elegy composed for Nu'mh Mundhii, Labid wrote:

Every thing, but Allah, is vain
And all happiness, unconditionally, will vanish
When a man is on a night journey, he thinks that he has accomplished some deed
But man spends his life in hopes
...
If you do not trust your self, approve it
Perhaps the past would unclose it to you
When you do not find a father other than 'Adnan and Ma'ad,
The judge (God) will punish you
On the day when every body will be informed of his deeds
When the record of his life is opened before Allah

Muhammad said of the first verse of the above eulogy: "The most true words said by a poet was the words of Labid" and "Verily, Everything except Allah is perishable and Umaiya bin As-Salt was about to be a Muslim (but he did not embrace Islam)."

[Ṣaḥīḥ Bukhāri, The Book of Manners, Ḥadīth No. 3841]
