= Hammad Ar-Rawiya =

8th-century Iraqi poet

- Born: Kufa, Iraq
- Died: Baghdad, Iraq
- Occupation: Scholar

Ḥammād al-Rāwiya (Arabic: حماد الراوية, 'Ḥammād the transmitter') (Abu-l-Qasim Hammad ibn Abi Laila Sapur (or ibn Maisara)) (8th century), Iranian scholar born in Kufa. He was of Daylamite origin. The date of his birth is given by some as 694 AD, by others as 714. He is considered the first person to have systematically collected Arabic poetry.

He was reputed to be the most learned man of his time in regard to the "days of the Arabs" (i.e. their chief battles), their stories, poems, genealogies and dialects. He is said to have boasted that he could recite a hundred long 'qasidas for each letter of the alphabet (i.e. rhyming in each letter) and these all from pre-Islamic times, apart from shorter pieces and later verses. Hence his name Hammad ar-Rawiya, " the reciter of verses from memory."

The Umayyad caliph Walid is said to have tested him, the result being that he recited 2900 qasidas of pre-Islamic date and Walid gave him 100,000 dirhems. He was favoured by Yazid II and his successor Hisham ibn Abd al-Malik, who brought him up from Iraq to Damascus.

Arabian critics, however, say that in spite of his learning he lacked a true insight into the genius of the Arabic language, and that he made more than thirty—some say three hundred—mistakes of pronunciation in reciting the Qur'an. To him is ascribed the collecting of the Mu'allaqat. No diwan of his is extant, though he composed verse of his own and probably a good deal of what he ascribed to earlier poets.
