= Ka'b ibn Zuhayr =

Arab Muslim poet and contemporary of Muhammad

Ka'b ibn Zuhayr كعب بن زهير
- Born: Najd; Arabia
- Died: Arabia
- Resting place: Medina
- Occupation: Arabic Poet
- Writing career
- Pen name: Ka'b
- Language: Arabic
- Period: Early Islamic
- Notable works: Writer of Banat Su'ad; Qasida in praise of Rasūl Allah

Kaʿb ibn Zuhayr (Arabic: كعب بن زهير) was an Arabian poet of the 7th century, and a contemporary of the Islamic prophet Muhammad.

Ka'b ibn Zuhayr was the writer of Bānat Suʿād (Su'ād Has Departed), a qasida in praise of Muhammad. This was the first na'at in Arabic. This is the original Al-Burda. He recited this poem in front of Muhammad after embracing Islam. Muhammad was so moved that he removed his mantle and wrapped it over him. According to traditional accounts, the mantle has been preserved as a relic. This original Burdah is not as famous as the one composed by Imam al-Busiri even though Muhammad had physically wrapped his mantle over Ka'b, not in a dream like in the case of Imam al-Busiri.

== Life ==
Ibn Zuhayr started composing poetry as a child; his father - a renowned poet himself - prohibited him and suggested not to compose poetry till the strengthening of his ideas and speech. Nevertheless, he continued to compose poetry. At last one day his father Zuhayr took a hard test of him, when he succeeded in that hard test his father allowed him to compose poetry and Ka'b become a famous poet of that time. When Islam came, Ka'b and his brother Bujayr went out to Muhammad but in the way Ka'b's intention changed and he turned back. Bujayr went to Muhammad and accepted Islam. When Ka'b found out about his brother accepting Islam, he composed a satire of his brother and Muhammad. After that Muhammad declared punishment for Ka'b. Then his brother Bujayr advised him to seek pardon of Muhammad. At first, he did not listen to his brother and started seeking help of others in the matter. But later he reached Muhammad through Abu Bakr and accepted Islam. It was then that he recited the first na'at Bānat Suʿād.

== Poetry ==
Ka'b found environment of poetry at his home. Because of this, he started composing poetry at a young age and become a famous poet. Critic Khalful Ahmar says that if Zuhayr had not done the long poetry through which he became famous, he wouldn't have considered him a greater poet than his son. Another critic says that if he had not composed his poetry using hard language then he could be a great poet as his father before him.
