= Charles James Lyall =

British Arabic scholar and civil servant

Sir Charles James Lyall KCSI CIE FBA (9 March 1845 – 1 September 1920) was a British Arabic scholar, and civil servant working in India during the period of the British Raj.

== Life ==
Charles James Lyall was born in London on 9 March 1845. He was the eldest son of a banker, also called Charles, and his wife Harriet (née Matheson). Educated initially at King's College School and then King's College London, in 1863 Lyall went on to study Greats at Balliol College, Oxford, from which he graduated in 1867 with a BA degree. He had already come first in the 1865 competitive examination for appointments in the Indian Civil Service, and after graduation he left England for India. He arrived there on 4 December 1867 and was appointed assistant magistrate and collector in the North-Western Provinces.

Lyall spent a brief period, between April and June 1872, as assistant under-secretary in the Foreign department of the British government of India. From September 1873 he was under-secretary in the department of Revenue, Agriculture and Commerce, He was appointed Companion of the Order of the Indian Empire (CIE) in January 1880, having ended his role as under-secretary in the previous year. From 1880 he was primarily engaged as secretary to the Chief Commissioner of Assam, but also had two periods as Judge and Commissioner for the Assam valley districts and a few months as secretary in the department of Revenue, Agriculture and Commerce.

From August 1889 Lyall spent some time working as home secretary in the Raj government, and was also tasked with an investigation of the penal settlement at Port Blair. He and A. S. Lethbridge, a surgeon in the British administration, concluded that the punishment of transportation to the Andaman Islands was failing to achieve the purpose intended and that indeed criminals preferred to go there rather than be incarcerated in Indian jails. Lyall and Lethbridge recommended that a "penal stage" existed in the transportation sentence, whereby transported prisoners were subjected to a period of harsh treatment upon arrival. The outcome was the construction of the Cellular Jail, which has been described as "a place of exclusion and isolation within a more broadly constituted remote penal space."

He was formally appointed as home secretary on a permanent basis in November 1890 and was the acting Chief Commissioner of Assam between July and October 1894. His last appointment before his retirement from India was between December 1895 and July 1898, during which period he was Chief Commissioner of the Central Provinces and Berar. He had been appointed a Companion of the Order of the Star of India (CSI) in June 1893 and then, in June 1897, he was gazetted in the Diamond Jubilee Honours list as a Knight Commander of the same Order.

Upon his return to England, Lyall was transferred to the India Office in London as secretary to the Judicial and Public Department. He held that post until his retirement in 1910.

Lyall died at his home in Cornwall Gardens, London, on 1 September 1920 and was buried at Putney Vale Cemetery. He had married Florence, a daughter of Captain Henry Fraser of Calcutta, in 1870 and the couple had two sons and five daughters.

== Scholarship ==
Letter by Lyall (1911)

In his leisure time Lyall was known as a scholar of various Eastern languages. He had demonstrated a gift for Hebrew while at university and he went on to learn Arabic, Hindustani and Persian, as well as sufficient of what was then called the Mikir language to enable him to translate some folktales that had been collected by Edward Stack. The Oxford Dictionary of National Biography says that he was "one of Britain's foremost scholars of Eastern languages" and that

His translations were particularly successful in combining an accurate rendering with a poetical diction which imitated more or less the metres of the originals, although usually without any attempt at rhyme.

He published the two-volume Translations of Ancient Arabian Poetry (1885, 1894), and translations of The Diwan of Abid ibn al-Abras (1913), The Poems of Amr Son of Qamiah (1919), and The Mufaddaliyat (1921), as well as articles on Hindustani and Arabic literature. His articles on "Hindostani Literature", etc. were published in the ninth and eleventh editions of the Encyclopædia Britannica.

Lyall was elected a Fellow of the British Academy, of the University of Calcutta and of King's College, London, as well as being a vice-president of the Royal Asiatic Society and an official representative of the government of India at various international oriental congresses between 1899 and 1908. He was President of the Asiatic Society of Bengal in 1894 and an honorary member both of that and of the Deutsche Morgenländische Gesellschaft. He also received honorary degrees from the universities of Edinburgh, Oxford and Strasbourg. He assisted in the foundation of the London School of Oriental Studies.

== Publications ==
The following list is not exhaustive. Lyall contributed papers to many journals.

- A sketch of the Hindustani language. Edinburgh: Adam & Charles Black. 1880.
- Translations of ancient Arabian poetry : chiefly, præ-Islamic, with an introduction and notes. Vol. 1. London: Williams and Norgate. 1885.
- Report on the working of the Penal settlement of Port Blair. Calcutta: Printed by the Superintendent of Government Printing, India. 1890–1891. (Co-authored with A. S. Lethbridge)
- Guide to the transliteration of Hindu and Muhammadan names in the Bengal army (3rd ed.). Calcutta: Office of the Superintendent of Government Printing. 1892.
- Translations of ancient Arabian poetry : chiefly, præ-Islamic, with an introduction and notes. Vol. 2. London: Williams and Norgate. 1894.
- Ten ancient Arabic poems with commentary by Tibrizi. 1891–1894.
- "The words "Ḥanif" and Muslim"". Journal of the Royal Asiatic Society. London: 771–784. October 1903.
- The Mikirs; from the papers of the late Edward Stack. London: David Nutt. 1908. ("Edited, arranged and supplemented" by Lyall)
- The Diwans of Abid ibn al-Abras, of Asad, and Amir ibn at-Tufail, of Amir ibn Sasaah, edited for the first time, from the ms. in the British museum, and supplied with a translation and notes. Leyden: E. J. Brill; London: Luzac & Co. 1913.
- The Mufaḍḍaliyāt; an anthology of ancient Arabian odes compiled by Al-Mufaḍḍal son of Muḥammad according to the recension and with the commentary of Abū Muḥammad Al-Qāsim Ibn Muḥammad Al-Anbāri. Vol. 1: Arabic text. Oxford: Oxford University Press. 1921. (Edited by Lyall)
- The Mufaḍḍaliyāt; an anthology of ancient Arabian odes compiled by Al-Mufaḍḍal son of Muḥammad according to the recension and with the commentary of Abū Muḥammad Al-Qāsim Ibn Muḥammad Al-Anbāri. Vol. 2: Translation and Notes. Oxford: Oxford University Press. 1918. (Edited by Lyall)
- The Mufaḍḍaliyāt; an anthology of ancient Arabian odes compiled by Al-Mufaḍḍal son of Muḥammad according to the recension and with the commentary of Abū Muḥammad Al-Qāsim Ibn Muḥammad Al-Anbāri. Vol. 3: Indexes to the Arabic text. Oxford: Oxford University Press. 1918. (Edited by Lyall; compiled by A. A. Bevan)
- "Some aspects of ancient Arabic poetry as illustrated by a little-known anthology". Proceedings of the British Academy. 8. London: 365–380. 1918.
- "Transliteration of Arabic and Persian. Report of the committee appointed to draw up a practical scheme for the transliteration into English of words and names belonging to the languages of the nearer East". Proceedings of the British Academy. 8. London. 1918.
- The poems of 'Amr son of Qami'ah. Cambridge: Cambridge University Press. 1919. (Edited and translated by Lyall)
