= Qasida =

Form of Arabic poetry

The qaṣīda (also spelled qaṣīdah; plural qaṣā’id) is an ancient Arabic word and form of poetry, often translated as ode. The qasida originated in pre-Islamic Arabic poetry and passed into non-Arabic cultures after the Arab Muslim expansion.

The word qasida is originally an Arabic word (قصيدة, plural qaṣā’id, قصائد), and is still used throughout the Arabic-speaking world; it was borrowed into some other languages such as Persian: قصیده (alongside چكامه, chakameh), and Turkish: kaside.

The classic form of qasida maintains both monometer, a single elaborate meter throughout the poem, and monorhyme, where every line rhymes on the same sound It typically runs from fifteen to eighty lines, and sometimes more than a hundred.

Well-known examples of this genre include the poems of the Mu'allaqat (a collection of pre-Islamic poems, the most being the one of Imru' al-Qays), the Qasida Burda (Poem of the Mantle) by Imam al-Busiri, and Ibn Arabi's classic collection Tarjumān al-Ashwāq (The Interpreter of Desires).

== Form ==
The most common form of the qasida is tripartite (or is constituted by three parts). The typical three-part structure runs as follows:

1. A desert motif (the nasīb)
2. A description of a camel or a horse (the raḥīl)
3. A tribal boast or similar (the fakhr)

== Origins ==
The tripartite qasida originated among Najdis (then a region extending east of the Hejazi mountains all the way up to modern-day Iraq) in the early sixth century. After repression of the development of kingships in the Arabian Peninsula on the part of the Byzantine and Sassanian empires, individuals in the peninsula began to invoke earlier notions of Arabian kingship in their poetry. The qasida may have emerged in this context, in the process of their negotiations of status with Arabophone kings that were invoking earlier notions of Arabian kingship. Supporting this is the fact that a number of the earliest reported qasidas were directed to the Ghassanids and Lakhmids. In particular, Miller places the origins of the tripartite qasida in the Lakhmid court of the city of al-Hira, the capital of the Lakhmids that is now located in the south-central of modern-day Iraq. The qasida would spread into the Levant in the late sixth century, finding its way to Syria, and from Syria, would be imported into the Hejaz in the time of Muhammad.

== Pre-Islamic Arabic poetry ==
According to an apocryphal story, a poetry contest resulted in the victory of seven or ten qasidas winning, which were all taken together and hung up (or suspended) in the Kaaba. Hence, they came to be known as the "Suspended Odes" (Mu'allaqat). Though the story is late and uncorroborated, it has shaped the understanding of pre-Islamic Arabic poetry later in the Islamic era. Instead, however, pre-Islamic Arabic poetry was short, self-contained, with an extemporized quality. The Hejaz itself attests to no tripartite qasidas.

== Other languages ==
=== Bengali ===
Qasidas were introduced to Dhaka, and later the rest of Bengal, during the Mughal era by Persians. Subahdar of Bengal, Islam Khan Chisti's naval fleet is said to have sung them after arriving in Jessore in 1604. In 1949, Hakim Habibur Rahman spoke of the recent revival of qasidas since that period in his book, Dhaka Panchas Baras Pahle (Dhaka, fifty years ago). The qasidas were promoted by nawabs and sardars across the region, and especially popular during the Islamic month of Ramadan. An old tradition of Old Dhaka is during the time of sehri, groups of people would sing qasidas to wake up the Muslims in the neighbourhood.

=== Burushaski ===
In Burushaski, the Qasida refers broadly to Isma'ili devotional literature in general rather than a specific style of poetry and is interchangeably used with the word Ginan in the language. It was regularly performed in the jamat-khana and has been a cornerstone of Ismaili practices in the Hunza Valley. The Burushaski Qasida is used extensively to describe Ismaili philosophy, theology, and hermeneutics in a vernacular language. Furthermore, the Qasida builds upon classical Isma'ili thought, with original theological, metaphysical, and teleological expositions that draw on the historically unprecedented philosophical injunctions of the Ismaili Imams.

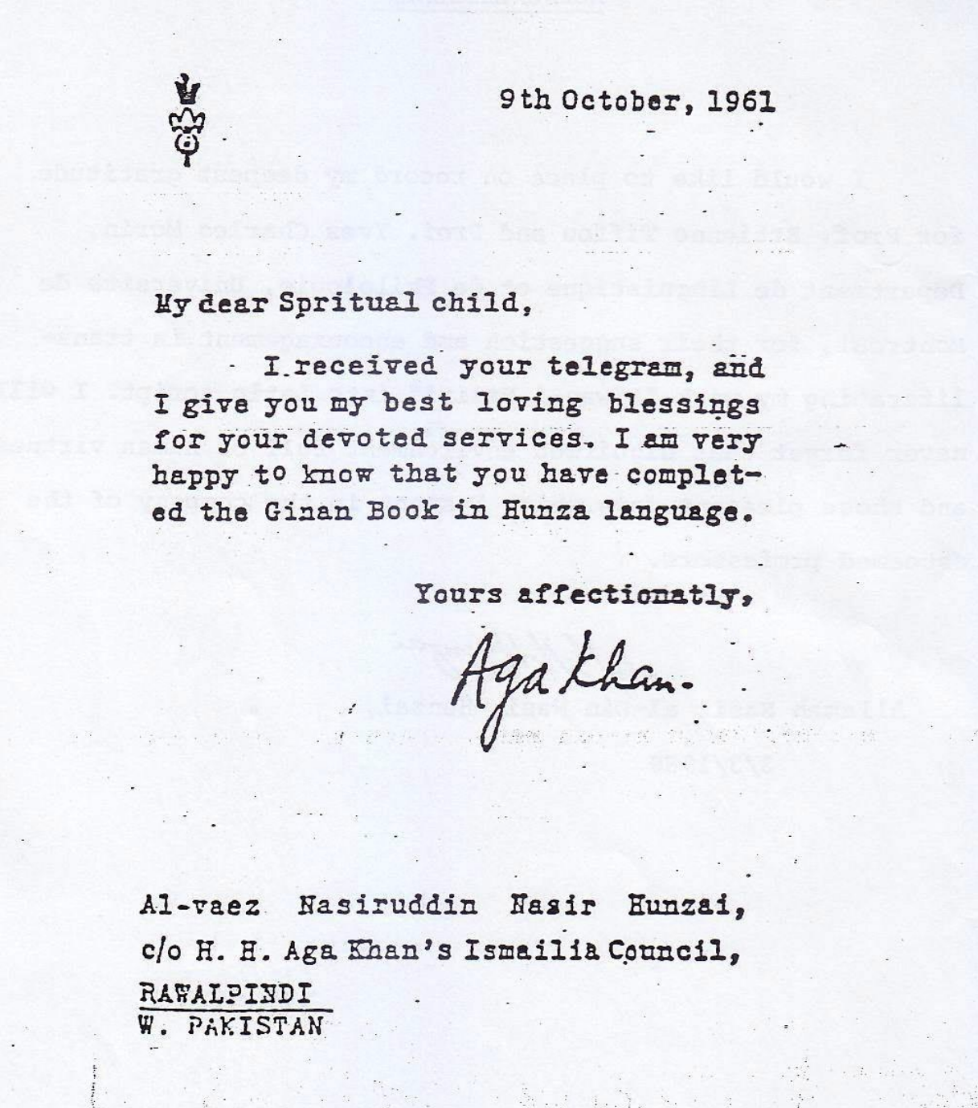
Aga Khan’s message to Hunzai, congratulating him on the completion of the "Ginan Book", 1961.

The Burushaski Qasida has had a pivotal role in developing the Burushaski language. Burushaski had been a broken, oral tongue, without a written script. This changed in 1961, 'Allamah Hunzai published his first poetry collection, entitled Nagmah-yi Israfil, which featured a selection of his Burushaski poems. The collection was telegrammed in the same year to the 49th Isma'ili Imam, Shah Karim al-Husayni, who, in his response, ascribed to 'Allamah Hunzai's collection the status of a "ginan book in the Burushaski language."

As van-Skyhawk notes this had the effect of sacralizing 'Allamah Hunzai's poetry for the Isma'ilis, and thus his poems were and continue to be widely recited in Isma'ili jama'at-khanas following this exchange.’ Apart from Allama Hunzai, leading Burushaski Qasida poets include Aalijah Ghulamuddin Hunzai and Wazir Fida Ali Esar.

Below is an excerpt from, “Noor-e-shama”, one of Allama Hunzai’s most popular Burushaski Qasida:

Noor e shama guskil e idigari je parvana mayam

Aql e begana numan une shul dewana mayam

Je atashqalta kuli tawaf ar maula

Unay mohaabat e orsham shuway sis e parvana mayam

— Nasir al-Din Nasir Hunzai
Translation:

I will become a firefly around you, O candle of Noor

I will lose all my senses and will turn mad in your love

If I can not circumambulate around you, O Maula

I will become a firefly around those intoxicated with your love

In 2013, the recitation of Burushaski ginans was discouraged at Isma'ili jamat khanas by regional councils. However, Burushaski Qasidas continue to be sung at Dawaat (traditional house warming), zikr-mehfil, and other similar private religious gatherings. Several artists such as Meher-Angez, Barkat Ali, Shakila Parveen, Islam Habib, and Noman Asmet are recording and publishing Burushaski Qasida on streaming platforms online. These renditions have amassed millions of views. Many of these recording are accompanied with a chardah and a daff, which are instruments inspired by Central Asian Isma'ili traditions.

=== Indonesian ===
In Indonesia, qasidah (Indonesian spelling: kasidah) refers broadly to Islamic music in general, rather than a specific style of poetry. Traditional qasidah was historically limited to Arab immigrant and pious Muslim neighbourhoods. Modern qasidah has broadened to include influence from Western and local Indonesian music.

=== Persian ===
After the 10th century Iranians developed the qasida immensely and used it for other purposes. For example, Nasir Khusraw used it extensively for philosophical, theological, and ethical purposes, while Avicenna also used it to express philosophical ideas. It may be a spring poem (Persian بهاریه, bahâriye) or autumn poem (Persian خزانیه, xazâniye). The opening is usually description of a natural event: the seasons, a natural landscape or an imaginary sweetheart. In the takhallos poets usually address themselves by their pen-name. Then the last section is the main purpose of the poet in writing the poem.

Persian exponents include:

- Farrokhi Sistani, the court poet of Mahmud of Ghazni (11th century), especially his 'Hunting Scene' (in Persian: قصیده شکارگاه)
- Manuchehri (11th century), who was court poet for Manuchehr ruler of Tabaristan, and later for Masʽud I of Ghazni. One of his qasidas is The Turkish harpist
- Masud Sa'd Salman (12th century) who was wrongfully imprisoned on the suspicion of treason
- Anvari Abiverdi, (12th century) especially his petition for help against the invasion of Mongols
- Khaqani Shirvani (12th century)
- and in the 20th century, Mohammad Taqi Bahar with his innovations in using the qasida for political purposes.

From the 14th century CE Persian poets became more interested in ghazal and the qasida declined. The ghazal developed from the first part of qasida in which poets praised their sweethearts. Mystical poets and Sufis used the ghazal for mystical purposes.

=== Somali ===
Somali Sufi Sheikhs such as Uways Al-Barawi, Shaykh Sufi, and Al-Zayla'i would often compose Qasida's on religious matters. A well known collection of Somali Qasida's is entitled Majumuʿa Qasaʿid fi Madh Sayyid Al-Anbiya (A Collection of Qasidas in praise of the Master of Prophets).

Hadiyat al-ʿAnam ila Qabr al-Nabi (Guidance of Humanity to the tomb of the Prophet) extols the Prophet Muhammad:

إذا ماشئت تيسير المراد\\فصل على رسولك خير هادي
وقل مستنجدًا في كل ناد\\صلاة الله مانادى المنادي
\\على المختار مولانا الحماد
حبيب الله أفضل من ترقى\\وقبره فاق كرسيا ومرقى
وكل مواضع الخيرات صدقا\\يفوح المسك والريحان حقا
\\لقبر محمد نور الفؤاد
تنور جميع أرجاء الحبيب\\يرى الأنوار قاصده بطيب
ويلقاه البعيد مع القريب\\يعم الآل جيران الحبيب
\\بعرف عبيره أهل البلاد

Translation:

Whenever you wish to make easy your objective then give a prayer to your messenger the best of Guides
And say, seeking aid in every circle blessings of Allah, as the crier cries on the Chosen, our master the praised

Beloved of Allah preferred of those who ascended, his tomb is above any throne or high place
As in every pious place, sincerely musk and spices give fragrances, truly to the tomb of Muhammad light of the heart

Every aspect of the Habib gives light the one who seeks him, sees the lights with goodness
The distances meets it along with the near it will encompass the family, the neighbors of the beloved
As well as the people of the community, with knowledge of his fragrance

=== Urdu/Hindi ===
Qasida in Urdu poetry is often panegyric, sometimes a satire, sometimes dealing with an important event. As a rule it is longer than the ghazal but follows the same system of rhyme.

=== Yazidi ===
The qesîde is a type of oral religious poem in Yazidi literature, considered to have been composed by the disciples of Sheikh Adi.

== See also ==
- Amadou Bamba
- The Kasîdah of Hâjî Abdû El-Yezdî (1880) by Richard Francis Burton, a 19th-century pseudotranslation
- Panegyric, an ancient Greek and Roman equivalent form of poetry
- Qaṣīdat-ul-Burda
- Qawwali
- Shahr Ashob
- Sufi poetry
- Urdu poetry
