= Global Thinkers Forum =

Non-profit London-based organization

- Formation: 2012; 14 years ago
- Type: Social-purpose organization
- Purpose: Education & Development
- Headquarters: London, UK
- Region served: Worldwide
- Official language: English
- CEO & Founder: Elizabeth Filippouli
- Website: globalthinkersforum.org

Global Thinkers Forum (GTF) is a non-profit, London-based organization and was incubated at Oxford University's Saïd Business School in 2011. It was created to "help our societies and leaders navigate a very complex world". GTF launched in 2012 in Amman, Jordan.

== History ==
GTF was founded in 2012 by Elizabeth Filippouli. The 1st GTF and inaugural GTF Awards for Excellence took place in Amman, Jordan (6-8 October 2012) discussing the role of the modern Arab woman, in the MENA region and globally. GTF convened some 350 international executives under the patronage of Queen Rania of Jordan and with the support of the King Abdullah II Fund for Development. GTF was incubated at Oxford Saïd Business School as an initiative to create new thinking and effect positive change for the world. Speakers and audience at GTF 2012 discussed issues such as the Arab Spring and the role of women in social transformation.

In 2013, Global Thinkers Forum organized its annual event and the GTF 2013 Awards for Excellence in Athens, Greece under the theme 'Leadership & Collaboration'. Among the GTF 2013 speakers in Athens were the High Representative of the UN Alliance of Civilizations Nassir Abdulaziz Al-Nasser, UNESCO Goodwill Ambassador Marianna V. Vardinoyiannis, Geir Lippestad, the defense lawyer for the Norwegian right-wing extremist Anders Behring Breivik who shared his experience about the impact of terrorist activities in Norway, Professor Tu Weiming, Stephen Cole, Ali Aslan, Hani Masri. The 2nd Forum opened with a keynote by the High Representative of the UN Alliance of Civilizations H.E. Mr. Nassir Abdulaziz Al Nasser, highlighting the importance of leadership responsibility at an international level. The event was held under the auspices of the Mayor of Athens Yorgos Kaminis Discussions on matters concerning Leadership, Collaboration and Cultural Understanding were held within the framework of the Forum.

In 2014, GTF hosted its Awards in Dubai, UAE, on 28 November 2014 under the theme: "Arab Women as Changemakers – A Celebration of Achievements".

In 2015, GTF co-hosted a Forum in Athens, Greece in partnership with Carnegie Council under the theme 'Democracy & Values', creating conversations around leadership and accountability, the issue of collective liability and ethical business. The event was attended by 150 academics, CEOs, public officials and entrepreneurs and was held under the auspices of the Municipality of Athens.

== Organization ==
Global Thinkers Forum also creates smaller events such as workshops and roundtable discussions, promoting women's and youth empowerment. In April 2014, Global Thinkers Forum and Google UAE co-hosted an event dedicated to women entrepreneurs & innovation in the Google offices in Dubai, in partnership with Oasis500 and Google. The event featured eight young women pitching to a crowd of MENA investors In July 2014, GTF hosted the State Department's Special Representative for Commercial and Business Affairs (CBA) Lorraine Hariton in London, for a conversation on international business development, moderated by Bloomberg's Stryker McGuire.

== Five-year goals ==
GTF's mission (five-year goals 2012–2016)is cited to 'nurture leadership talent among women and youth'. As part of this commitment the think tank maps, links, collects and integrates information from across the international system, creates events that help share knowledge and establish common best practices in governance, business, society.

GTF also produces publications and engages its members in sector-specific initiatives. In 2014, GTF partnered with UN Women to help advance the Beijing +20 platform and create conversations on Women's Rights in the MENA region.

== Funding sources and membership ==
GTF is funded by sponsors from the private sector, grants, donations and through annual memberships.

== Advisory board ==
The GTF Advisory Board steers the overall strategy, direction and effectiveness of the organization. Notable members of the GTF Boards include: Princess Sumaya bint El Hassan, Saskia Sassen, Muna AbuSulayman, Salim Amin, Queen Sylvia of Buganda, Roya Mahboob, Victoria A. Budson, Marc Ventresca, Hakan Altinay, Lucian Hudson, Richard Sambrook, Dirk Brossé, Ameera A. Binkaram

== GTF Awards for Excellence ==
In 2012, GTF inaugurated its honorary Awards for Excellence. Among GTF Award Honourees are: Sheikha Lubna Al Qasimi, Margery Kraus CEO APCO, Princess Rym al-Ali, Marianna Vardinoyannis, Nassir Abdulaziz Al-Nasser, Ibrahim Abouleish Founder of SEKEM, Shahira Amin, Tu Weiming, Maisah Sobaihi, Haifa Fahoum Al Kaylani, Muna Abu Sulayman

== Notable strategic partners ==
Among Global Thinkers Forum's strategic partners are: UN Women, King Abdullah II Fund for Development, Carnegie Council for Ethics in International Affairs, Anna Lindh Foundation, Solidarity Now, Open University, ALBA Business School.

== Bibliography ==
- By Dr Reginald Watts, Dr Roger Hayes (2015). Reframing the Leadership Landscape: Creating a Culture of Collaboration. Gower Publishing Ltd (London, UK). ISBN 9781472458704
