= Nashwa Al-Ruwaini =

Egyptian producer and media personality

- نشوى الرويني
- Born: October 18, 1972 (age 53); Cairo, Egypt
- Citizenship: Egypt
- Occupations: Television presenter, media executive, producer
- Years active: 1990s–present
- Notable work: Kalam Nawaem, Million's Poet
- Website: nashwa.tv

Nashwa Al-Ruwaini (b. 1972, Cairo) is an Egyptian producer and media personality. She has been called the "Oprah Winfrey of the Arab World".

== Career ==
Al Ruwaini began her career aged 15 on Qatari radio. She went on to Qatar TV, becoming the youngest female presenter on Arab TV.

Ruwaini was hired by MBC in both London and Cairo, where she worked on the first Arab daily morning show, the Arab version of Who Wants to Be a Millionaire and the talkshow Kalam Nawaem. Her own talk show, "Nashwa", which was launched in 2006 by Dubai TV.

Al Ruwaini founded Pyramedia, her own production company, in 1998. The production company is responsible for such shows as Prince of Poets and Million's Poet. Al Ruwaini and Pyramedia were also involved in the casting process for the live-action remake of Disney's Aladdin. She is also CEO of the Nashwa Charity Foundation, Delma Medical Centre and Spa, a member of the International Academy of TV Arts and Sciences, and Co-Founder and board member of the Abu Dhabi Film Festival.
