= Abdulla Al-Salem =

Abdullah Al-Salem عبدالله السالم
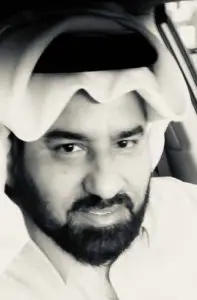
- Qatari Poet Abdulla alsalem
- Citizenship: Qatari
- Education: PhD in the University of Jordan
- Occupations: Poet; writer
- Known for: Known as a poet, critic, Writer. Published articles in local journals

Notes
- Abdullah Al-Salem Page from Qatar

Abdullah Al-Salem (Arabic: عبدالله السالم, romanized: eabdallah alssalim. Abdullah Al-Salem was born in 1975, in Doha and lived in the Kingdom of Saudi Arabia, the United Arab Emirates and Jordan. In Qatar, he held the position of Director of the Doha International Center for Dialogue of Religions. He writes on his website and the literature of his literary works, Including poetry, literary criticism, short stories, articles and letters.He holds a master's degree in law and currently holds a PhD in family law. He also wrote articles for the Burooq and Al Jasra magazine, and participated in many festivals and evenings in Qatar. He published a critical book entitled: The Poetry Defects: A Critical Study in Building the Contemporary Nabati Poem.

== Literature and art ==
Abdullah Al-Salem began writing Nabati poetry from the age of 9 by reciting poems about his father, as he says about himself. He created a blog in 2005 spreading his literary creativity. He defines himself as "a lover of literature, children, movies, women, music and God." . In his blog, Abdullah Al Salem presented several poetry albums, including Nabati poetry, eloquent poetry, and prose. In addition to some songs, such as "Since I Was Little", it is a national song written by the Qatari poet Abdullah Al-Salem and the performance of the artist, Issa Al-Kubaisi. Since I was young: A national song, lyrics and compositions by the Qatari poet Abdullah Al-Salem, and vocals by the Qatari artist, Issa Al-Kubaisi. Also, English poets wrote as an emergency meeting.

== Literary criticism ==
Several poetic and artistic works have been criticized, such as the Million's Poet. Criticism has also been written for a number of books and films. Book: Poetry Defects, A Critical Study on Building the Contemporary Nabati Poem. Printed by the Ministry of Culture, Arts and Heritage in Qatar. The book deals with the faults of poetry A critical book in Nabati poetry, and the writer considers that it is considered the first book of its kind in the field of criticism of Nabati poetry, and hopes to become a reference for scholars of the book. The imperfections of Nabati poetry, who cares about it, and even critics say. He also wrote a literary book for children (Legendary writing:Book save a child (In Arabic).
