= List of richest literary awards =

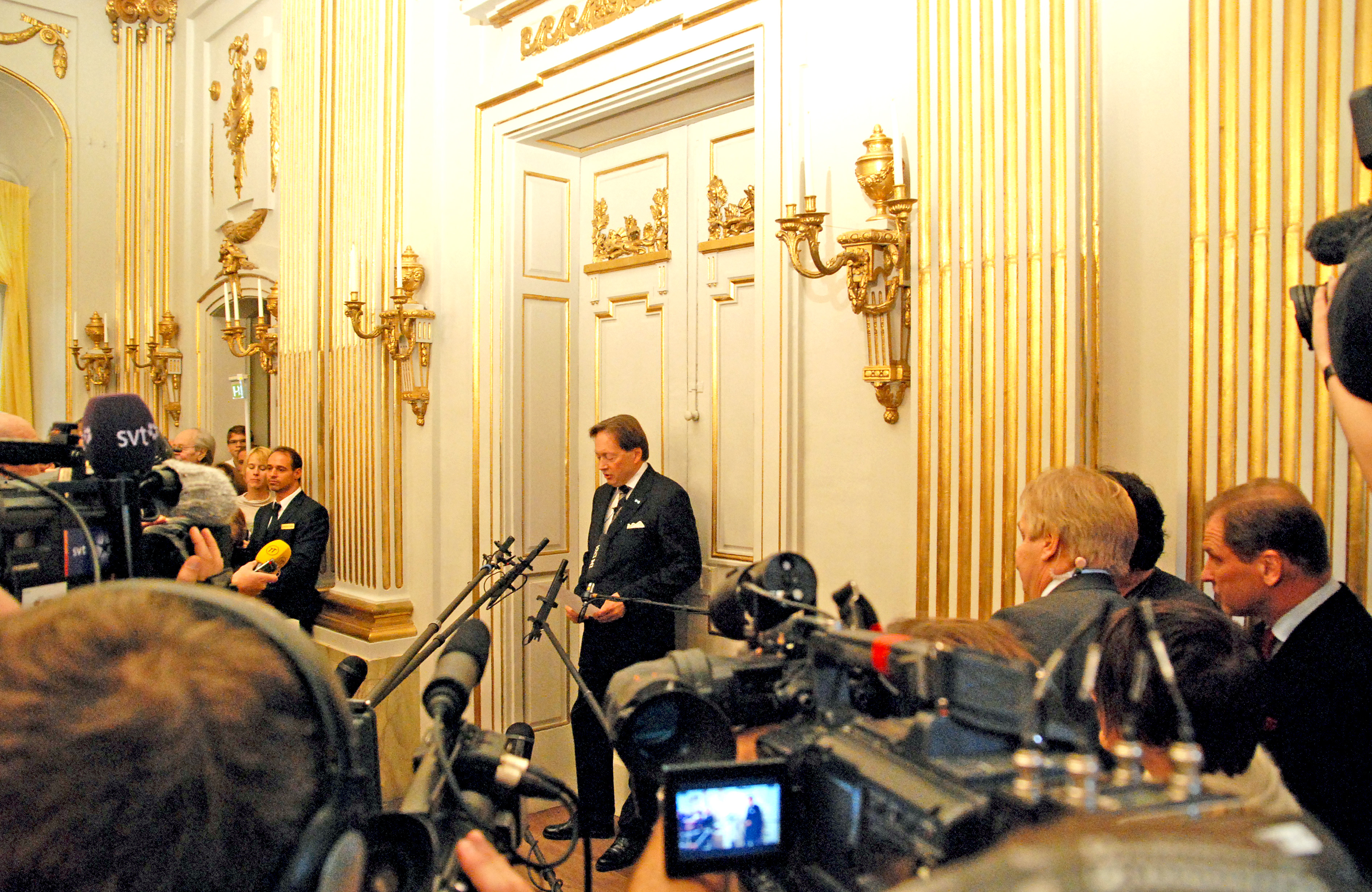
Announcement of the Laureate of the Nobel Prize in Literature, one of the world's richest literary prizes, at the Swedish Academy in Stockholm (2008).

Many literary awards give significant remunerations. This is a list of active literary awards from around the world with a prize of at least US$100,000 or equivalent. Although global in scope and comprising over 35 awards, most of the prizes are in only four currencies: United Arab Emirates dirham, Swedish krona, Euro, and United States dollar.

== Inclusion criteria ==
- The award is active and is primarily focused on writing (novels, poetry, non-fiction etc..)
- The remuneration is equal to or greater than US$100,000 or equivalent. Because fluctuating exchange rates move non-US dollar denominated awards in and out of the list over time, awards near this amount are also included.
- The award is for any genre of writing (fiction, journalism, etc.) or award type (book or author).
- The listed remuneration is for a single winner or co-winners. The list does not aggregate the total value of runners-up and other prizes within the same award. For example, the Prime Minister's Literary Awards is listed as A$100,000 even though it is composed of four prizes totalling A$400,000.

== Awards ==
Approximate Equivalent in US$ (October 2024)	Amount	Name	Type	Host country	Primary language	Notes	Ref(s)
1,361,000	DH 5,000,000	Million's Poet	—N/a	UAE	Arabic	Award for a single poem. Total prizes for 2nd to 5th positions are approximately $2,723,000. Sister prize of Prince of Poets	
1,170,000	€1,000,000	Premio Planeta de Novela (winner)	Book	Spain	Spanish	See also runner-up of same prize.	
1,102,000	kr 11,000,000	Nobel Prize in Literature	Author	Sweden	Any	There are six Nobel Prizes of 11 million kronor each.	
466,500	kr 5,000,000	Astrid Lindgren Memorial Award	Author	Sweden	Any	Authors, illustrators, oral storytellers and people or organisations that work to promote reading in children's and young adult literature, are eligible.	
272,000	DH 1,000,000	Prince of Poets	—N/a	UAE	Arabic	Award for a single poem. Sister prize of Million's Poet	
250,000	US$250,000	The Dorothy and Lillian Gish Prize	Author^{*}	United States	English	Open to all arts, not just writers.	
228,000	kr 2,500,000	International Ibsen Award	Author^{*}	Norway	Any	Any drama and theater position eligible, not just writers.	
218,000	€200,000	Prix mondial Cino Del Duca	Author	France	Any	Open to any writer working in either scientific or literary form	
200,000	DH 750,000	Sheikh Zayed Book Award	Book	United Arab Emirates	Arabic	7 awards each valued at AED 750,000	
200,000	US$200,000	Saudi King Abdullah International Award for Translation	Author	Saudi Arabia	Arabic	5 awards of 200,000 each (1 million total)	
175,000	US$175,000	Alfaguara Prize	Book	Spain	Spanish		
175,000	US$175,000	Windham–Campbell Literature Prizes	Author	United States	English	Composed of eight awards of $175,000 each.	
164,000	€150,000	Premio Planeta de Novela (runner-up)	Book	Spain	Spanish	See also winner of same prize.	
150,000	US$150,000	FIL Literature Award	Author	Mexico	Spanish		
150,000	US$150,000	Carol Shields Prize for Fiction	Author	US	English	Prize awards works of fiction by women and non-binary writers in Canada and the United States.	
150,000	US$150,000	Sultan Bin Ali Al Owais Cultural Awards	Author	United Arab Emirates	Arabic	Composed of 4 awards of $150,000 each.	
146,000	kr. 1,000,000	Sonning Prize	Author^{*}	Denmark	Any	Open to all arts not just writers.	
134,000	€125,000	Miguel de Cervantes Prize	Author	Spain	Spanish		
131,000	€120,000	Premio de Novela Fernando Lara	Book	Spain	Spanish		
125,000	US$125,000	Carlos Fuentes International Prize for Literary Creation in the Spanish Language	Author	Mexico	Spanish	Any writer writing in the Spanish language	
110,000	€100,000	Premio Primavera de Novela	Book	Spain	Spanish		
110,000	€100,000	International Dublin Literary Award	Book	Ireland	English		
110,000	€100,000	Premio Novela Histórica Alfonso X El Sabio	Book	Spain	Spanish		
110,000	€100,000	Camões Prize	Author	Portugal; Brazil	Portuguese		
100,000	US$100,000	Sheikh Hamad Award for Translation and International Understanding	Book	Qatar	Arabic	Translation award. Total award value is $2 million.	
100,000	US$100,000	Nigeria Prize for Literature	Book	Nigeria	English		
100,000	US$100,000	Pritzker Literature Award for Lifetime Achievement in Military Writing	Author	United States	English		
100,000	US$100,000	Ruth Lilly Poetry Prize	Author	United States	English		
100,000	US$100,000	Wallace Stevens Award	Author	United States	English		
100,000	US$100,000	Sami Rohr Prize for Jewish Literature	Book	United States	English		
100,000	US$100,000	The Kingsley and Kate Tufts Poetry Awards	Author	United States	English		
100,000	US$100,000	Park Kyong-ni Prize	Author	South Korea	Any		
100,000	US$100,000	Jackson Poetry Prize	Author	United States	English		

Key
- Columns are sortable (click small square)
- Type: Book: Award is for a book title / Author: Award is for an author name
- (*) Award is not literary-specific but has some literary winners.
- This list is incomplete; you can help by expanding it.

The following awards have a superlative claim within certain defined categories, as described and sourced in the Notes column.

Equivalent in US$ (April 2016)	Amount	Name	Type	Host country	Primary language	Claim
524,527	kr 5,000,000	Astrid Lindgren Memorial Award	Children's literature	Sweden	Any	The richest children's literature prize in the world.
138,180	€125,000	RBA Prize for Crime Writing	Crime fiction	Spain	Any	"The world's most lucrative crime fiction prize."
75,000	US$75,000	Cundill History Prize	Non-fiction and history	Canada	English	"the largest purse for a book of non-fiction published in English"
55,270	€50,000	Premio de Narrativa Breve Ribera del Duero	Short story collection	Spain	Spanish	"the largest in the world for a competition of this kind".
39,358	£30,000	Sunday Times Short Story Award	Short story	United Kingdom	English	"The world's richest short story prize" (single short story).
38,081	CA$50,000	Montreal International Poetry Prize	Poetry	Canada	Any	Thought to be the world's richest award for a single-poem.
