= Ousha the Poet =

Emirati poet (1920–2018)

Ousha bint Khalifa Al Suwaidi
- عوشه بنت خليفة السويدي
- Born: 1 January 1920; Al Ain, Trucial States
- Died: 27 July 2018 (aged 98); Dubai, United Arab Emirates
- Father: Khalifa Bin Al Sheikh Ahmad Bin Khalifa Al Suwaidi
- Relatives: Ahmed Bin Khalifa Al Suwaidi (brother)

Ousha bint Khalifa Al Suwaidi (Arabic: عوشه بنت خليفة السويدي) also known as Fatat Al-Arab (Girl of the Arabs), Ousha Al Sha'er (Ousha the Poet) (1 January 1920 – 27 July 2018) was an Emirati poet. She is regarded as among the finest Arabic Nabati poets.

== Early life and education ==
Ousha was born and raised in Al Ain and moved later in life to the emirate of Dubai. A prominent cultural figure, she is regarded as among the finest Arabic Nabati poets with a large number of her poems sung by popular Emirati and Arab artists. Her work has been influential in the development of Nabati poetry in the UAE, particularly among young female poets. At the age of 15, Ousha's talents were recognized by the poetry community for her poetry recitals, a noteworthy achievement at her time considering how male dominated the poetry field was.

== Works ==
Ousha's work was influenced by both classical poets such as Al-Mutanabbi, Abu Tammam and Al-Ma'arri, as well as local Nabati poets including Al Majidi bin Thahir, Rashid Al Khalawi, Saleem bin Abdul Hai and Mohsin Hazzani.

In 1989, Sheikh Mohammed bin Rashid Al Maktoum, Crown Prince of Dubai at the time, dedicated a poem from his first published collection giving her the sobriquet "Fatat Al Arab" instead of her original name "Fatat Al Khaleej" (Girl of the Gulf). Ousha's poetry works published in classical Arabic covered a variety of themes including patriotic sentiments, praise, nostalgia, wisdom and love. the females poets first book was published in 1990 by the Emirati poet Hamad Bin Khalifa Bou Shehab, a second edition of the book was later published in the year 2000.

Fatat Al-Arab's poetry can be accessed on the poets official website at

== Awards and recognition ==
In 2010, Ousha was awarded at the 11th Sharjah Festival of Classic Poetry and later won the Abu Dhabi award, presented by Sheikh Mohammed Bin Zayed Al Nahyan. In 2011 an annual award for female Emirati poets was established in her name and a section in her honour was dedicated in Dubai's Women's Museum. A biography of Ousha was published by Rafia Ghubash, the President of the Arabian Gulf University in Bahrain. She was awarded with Abu Dhabi Awards for her services in 2009.

On 28 November 2022, she was celebrated with a Google Doodle. The Google doodle image was illustrated by Abu Dhabi-based artist Reem Al Mazrouei.

The asteroid 23871 Ousha, discovered in 1998 by the American LINEAR project, was named in 2025 in her honor. It is one of the asteroids planned to be visited by the MBR Explorer spacecraft of the United Arab Emirates Space Agency.
