= Shammar (disambiguation) =

Shammar is an Arab tribal confederation.

Shammar (Arabic: شَمَّر) may refer to:

== Events ==
- Battle of Jabal Shammar (1929)

== People ==
- Abdulrahman Adel Al-Shammari (born 1974), Saudi poet

== Places ==
- Shammar Mountains, a mountain range in northern Saudi Arabia
- Rashidi Arabia, sometimes known as Emirate of Jabal Shammar, a historical monarchy
