= Heliopolis University =

Private university in Cairo, Egypt

Heliopolis University for Sustainable Development
- جامعة هليوبوليس للتنمية المستدامة
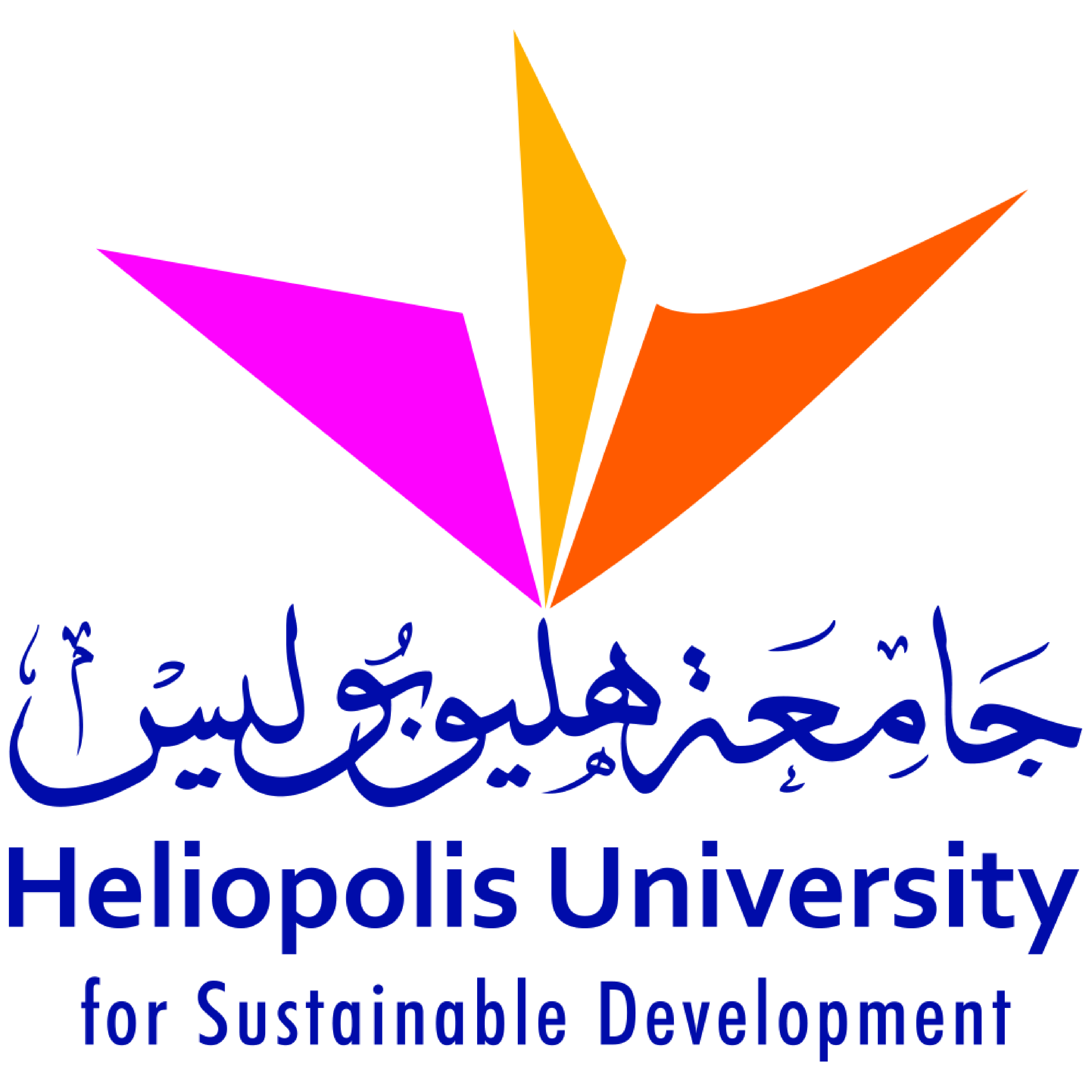
- Motto: Different, on purpose!
- Type: Private
- Established: 2009
- Founders: Prof. Dr. Ibrahim Abouleish
- Chairman: Mr. Helmy Abo Eleish
- President: Prof. Dr. Gouda Helal
- Location: Cairo, Egypt; 30.1536°N 31.4316°E
- Website: www.hu.edu.eg

Heliopolis University is a non-profit university in Egypt with the mission of sustainable development. In Fall 2018, Heliopolis University had around 1,700 students in five faculties.

== Location ==
Heliopolis University is located in Salam City, El Horreya, greater Cairo, near Cairo International Airport and Belbeis Desert Road.

== Overview ==
Heliopolis University was established by presidential decree 298/2009 in 2009. In 2012 the first 128 students enrolled in the faculties of Business and Economics, Engineering and Pharmacy.

The idea to create a sustainable university was developed by Ibrahim Abouleish, the leader of the SEKEM initiative, which was founded in 1977. In his vision the university is an important part in the SEKEM Initiative. Like other parts of SEKEM, the University follows sustainable principles. These principles are divided in different dimensions, like societal, cultural, and business life, which have to go hand in hand with the environment. The SEKEM Initiative handled these four main dimensions in a specific framework, which called sustainable flower.

Based on this framework, students not only learn their specific curricula, but also take lessons in arts, culture, social sciences, environmental studies, and foreign languages. These skills are handled in an obligatory study which is called Core program. For teaching purposes and to promote sustainability, Heliopolis University operates a wastewater system and several photovoltaic installations, students and staff can use a cafeteria, a restaurant, as well as sport and leisure facilities. Furthermore a botanical garden is integrated in the campus of the University.

== Social and environmental interaction ==
Theory:

- All natural resources are limited, like water, oil, food, nutrition and fertile soil. Because of this, people need to think about future generations too.
- to create a sustainable change creative, innovative as well educated people are needed who can solve the current and future challenges and implement solutions.
- Sustainability means also teamwork and solidarity.
- Theory and praxis must work together.

Praxis:

- Experiences to save natural resources are collected by Heliopolis University and its mother organisation SEKEM, for instance to economize resources like water and electricity. The experiences gained by SEKEM are used in different curricula at the university.
- With the collected experiences Heliopolis University provides access to educate people for the sustainable change.
- To foster teamwork, solidarity and creativity Heliopolis University created the Core program, where different people are encouraged to work together. Furthermore they can develop their societal and cultural skills.
- Next to studying, Heliopolis University offers different internships that enable students to practice what they have learned.

== Faculties ==
Since the opening of the faculties of Organic Agriculture and Physical Therapy in 2018, the Heliopolis University runs five degree-granting faculties. The first academic year started in 2012 with the three faculties in engineering, business and pharmacy. All of these faculties are based on a sustainable concept which keeps the balance between human and environment and theory and practice.

The five faculties with Bachelor degrees, master degrees are currently not offered:

Faculty	Degrees
Faculty of Engineering	BSc in Water Engineering, BSc in Energy Engineering, BSc in Mechatronics, BSc in Green Architecture
Faculty of Business and Economics	BSc in Accounting, BSc in Marketing, BSc in Economics and Development, BSc in Management and Human Development, BSc in Finance and Investment
Faculty of pharmacy and Drug Technology	BSc in Pharmacy
Faculty of Physical Therapy	BSc in Physical Therapy
Faculty of Organic Agriculture	BSc in Organic Crop Production, BSc in Food Processing Technology

== The core program ==
To encourage students' learning capacity and to support their different skills, Heliopolis University developed the Core Program. It should maximize the student's creativity, innovation ability and social responsibility. Furthermore students should learn problem- solving, critical thinking and to deal with stress and big challenges.

To reach these aims the core program implements different learning courses. These are:

- Arts
- Social sciences
- Sustainability

== The Space of Culture ==
The Space of Culture aims to connect different cultures. It is a tool to bring students, professors and people around the world from diverse universities, countries and cultures together. The Space of Culture is based on the philosophy to enable an intercultural meeting point and a crossroad between orient and occident, between West, East, North and South.

This cultural interactivity will provide different programs where people can change ideas and opinions.

- Poetry recitation
- Choirs
- Theatrical performances
- Workshops about intercultural dialogues
- Documentary movies
- Musical performances

== International partners ==
- Alanus University of Arts and Social Sciences, Germany
- Cairo University, Egypt
- Ain Shams University, Egypt
- Zuyd University of Applied Sciences, Netherlands
- University of Maribor, Slovenia
- Marburg University, Germany
- RWTH Aachen, Germany
- TU Graz, Austria
- University of Hohenheim, Germany
- University of Osnabrück, Germany
