= Mohammad Qaratas =

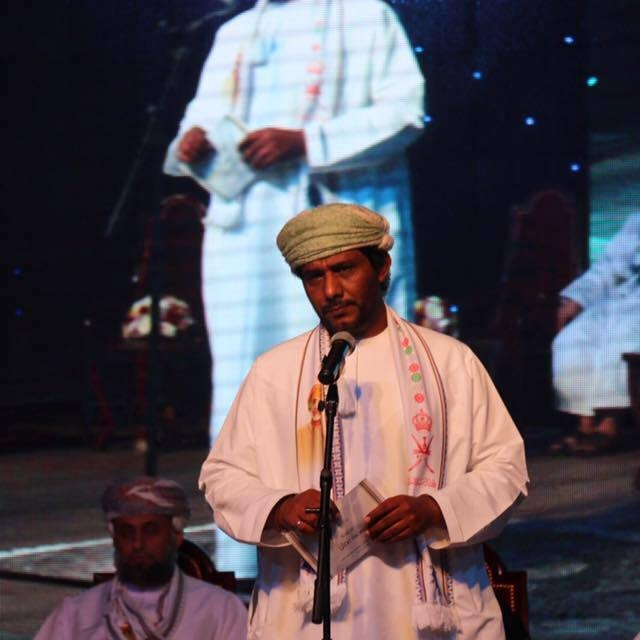
- Born: 1970 (age 55–56); Salalah, Oman
- Education: Sultan Qaboos University; Coventry University
- Occupations: Poet and novelist
- Relatives: Muslim Qaratas Amer Al Mahri (father)

Mohammed bin Qaratas Al Mahri (Arabic: محمد قراطاس) is an Omani poet, novelist, and writer, who was born in Salalah in the first quarter of the 1970s. He started writing at an early age and was a poet since the end of the 1990s. He writes in all different forms, including classical poetry (also known as vertical poetry), free verse, and prose poetry. Qaratas claims that poetry is a living being that comes at will and goes through evolution and change over time, If it stops evolving, that indicates its death in the heart of a poet.

== Life ==
Mohammad Qaratas was born in Salalah during the time when the Dhofar War was at its height. His father, Sheikh Muslim Qaratas Amer Al Mahri, was one of the founding leaders of the national forces that fought alongside Sultan Qaboos. In his book, SAS Operation Oman, English writer Tony Jeapes stated that he was one of the most important leaders in the war. He died several months before the victory was declared.

== Education ==
he received his education in his native city, Salalah, then attended the Faculty of Engineering at Sultan Qaboos University in Muscat and completed his studies there. He worked for several years as a power plant engineer before going to Coventry University to earn an MSc in Engineering Business Management. In addition, he wrote research on renewable energy in Oman, specifically in Dhofar, his project was approved by UNESCO's International Geoscience Programme Council.

== Works ==
=== Poetry ===
Qaratas has three poetry collections. The first of which being:

- What the Light Inherited, a poetry collection published by Al Intishar Al Arabi Publishing House, Beirut, 2013.
- Estrangement of the Arabian Sea, a poetry collection published by Ninawa Publishing House, Damascus, 2016.

During his career, he visited many Arab and international countries participating in their international festivals, here are some examples:

- Omani Poetry Festival, from the 1st festival in 1998 to the 5th in 2006.
- First season of Prince of Poets poetry competition.
- Critical Reading at the Emirates Writers Union in Abu Dhabi, 2007.
- Omani Cultural Week in Algeria, 2008.
- Omani Cultural Week in Damascus, 2008.
- Arabic Poetry Festival in Nouakchott, 2010.
- Poetry Festival in Ouarzazate, 2008.
- Poetry Reading in Agadir, 2008.
- Arab Poetry Forum in Tan-Tan, 2012.
- House of Poetry in Sharjah, 2016.

=== Novels ===
His first novel, The Steps (original: al-Aʻtāb), was published by Saqi Books, Beirut in 2016. Critics took an interest in the novel and several articles published in Arabic newspapers were written about it.

In addition, he has published many poems and literary articles in regional and Arabic journals and newspapers.

Here are some examples:

- "The Homeland of Swords"
- "Coffeeshops"
