= Elizabeth Filippouli =

Greek-British writer and entrepreneur

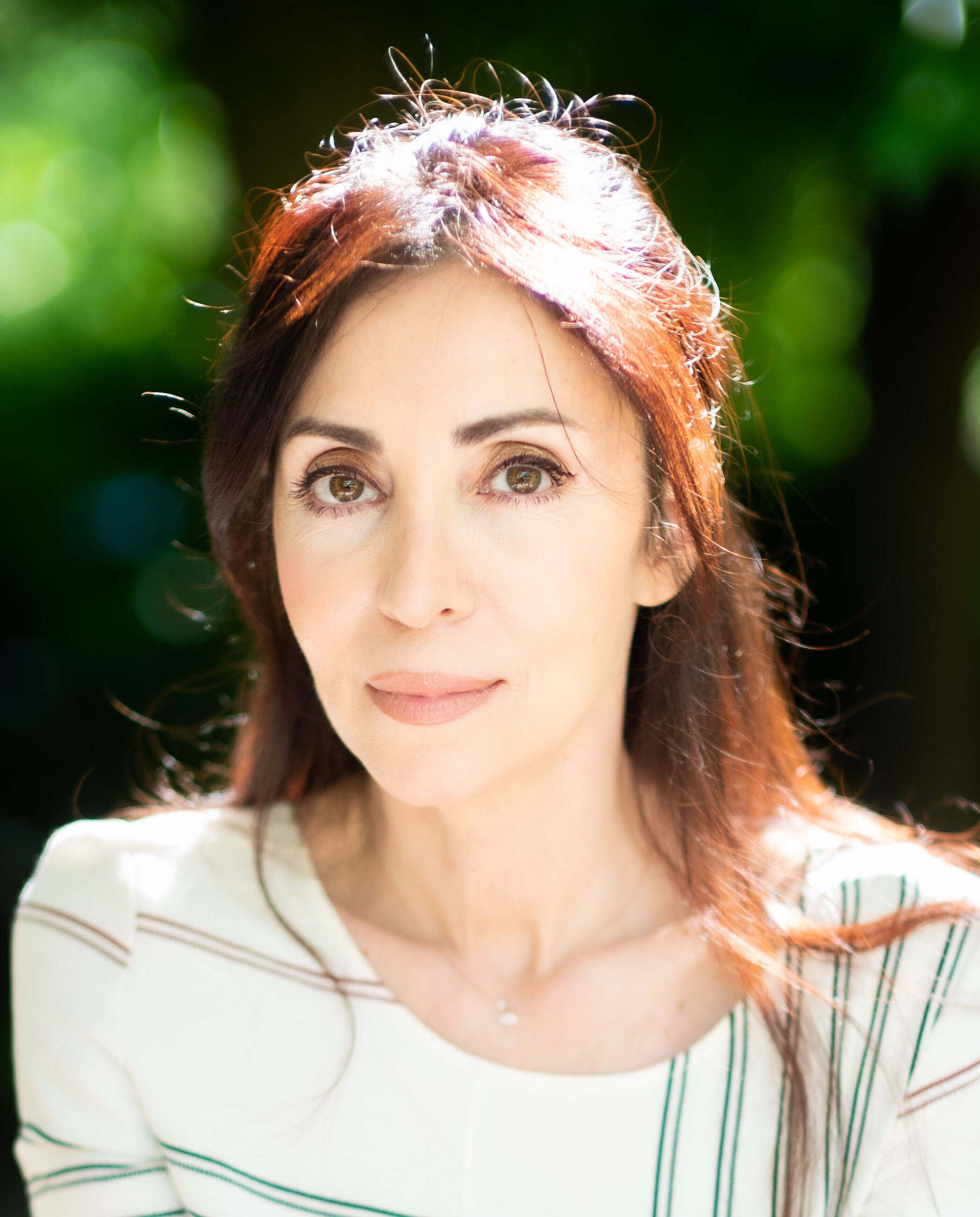
- Filippouli in 2021
- Born: Elizabeth (Elissavet) - Eleni Filippouli; Athens, Greece
- Education: Harvard University
- Occupations: Journalist, writer, social entrepreneur
- Writing career
- Language: Greek, English
- Genres: Non-fiction, Fiction
- Subjects: Politics, society, entrepreneurship, media, theater
- Notable works: Alexander the Great-Between Myth and Imagination, From Women to the World-Letters for a New Century
- Website: www.elizabethfilippouli.com

Elizabeth Filippouli (Greek: Ελισάβετ Φιλιππούλη) is a London-based writer and social entrepreneur.

== Early life and education ==
Elizabeth was born and raised in Athens, Greece. She is the daughter of journalist, author, and playwright Stamatios-Alexandros Filippoulis (Σταμάτης Φιλιππούλης) and entrepreneur Ελένη Φιλιππούλη. Her uncle on her father's side was the Greek publisher (el: Αλέκος Φιλιππὀπουλος) and her great-great aunt was Μαρίκα Μπότση the first woman in Greece elected as Mayor. Filippouli was married to Greek MP and novelist Γιάννης Γιαννέλλης-Θεοδοσιάδης. Elizabeth studied an undergraduate degree in German Literature in Kapodistriakon University of Athens. She has an MBA on Strategy & Innovation from Oxford's Said Business School, an MA on Transnational Media & Globalisation from London City University and an ALM in Creative Writing and Literature from Harvard University.

== Career ==
As a journalist she specializes on international affairs and has worked for broadsheet papers, radio and television in Greece and internationally. She joined CNN International as World Report contributor in 2001 and Al Jazeera English as presenter and documentary producer in 2005. For Al Jazeera English she produced the documentaries: Greekgate, Italygate, A King Without a Country. She has interviewed leading figures such as: Ted Turner, James Rubin, Deepak Chopra, Santiago Calatrava, Enrique Oltuski, Alberto Juantorena, Chris Cramer, Lord Robertson, Christiane Amanpour, Peter Arnett, King Constantine of Greece, Lord Coe.

In 2011, Filippouli founded Global Thinkers Forum a non-profit organisation promoting values-based leadership , and supporting women and youth for economic integration.

== Accountable leadership work ==
In 2012 the inaugural Global Thinkers Forum was hosted in Amman during the Arab Spring, discussing the role of Arab women as agents of social change. Founding Patron was Queen Rania Al Abdullah and in the following years it engaged notable individuals such as Zaha Hadid, Sir David Frost, Arianna Huffington, Tobias Ellwood, Elif Shafak, Sheikha Lubna Al Qasimi, Nawal El Saadawi, Bartholomew I of Constantinople, Professor Tu Weiming, Muhtar Kent, Marianna Vardinogiannis, Lord John Alderdice, Baroness Lola Young, Tawakkol Karman, May Chidiac, Rory Stewart, Baroness Onora O'Neill, Ellen Johnson-Sirleaf, Kate Winslet, Sir Dirk Brosse, Fadi Ghandour, Dominic McVey, Muna AbuSulayman, Dame Stephanie Shirley, Rosalia Arteaga. Filippouli is an advocate of values-driven thinking and collaboration, being vocal about 'The imminent need for our societies to build on a long-term vision and to prioritise 'we' instead of 'I'".

== Mentoring youth and women ==
In 2015 Filippouli launched the mentoring programs, 'Telemachus' and 'Athena' to support youth and women through mentoring. The programs have helped more than 500 individuals around the world launch social impact projects.

== Athena40 ==
Athena40 was launched at UNESCO on International Women’s Day in 2018, to help advance the role of women and support the Sustainable Development Goals. Athena40 hosts a 'Global Conversation' organising panels in cities around the world. Filippouli believes that during the pandemic "women were affected disproportionately and in multiple ways". In 2024 the keynote speaker in London was Lady Mayoress Elisabeth Mainelli and in 2025 was Baroness Catherine Ashton who emphasised: “This is now a time for real leadership. Leadership is not about strong man tactics.It is about thoughtful ways to find solutions. Women bring different skills, we deal with things differently, we deal with aggression differently, and we build relationships differently. The greatest combination that can solve any problem on the planet is when you bring women and men together.” “Athena40 Women and Sustainability Awards 2025”

== From women to the world ==
Filippouli's second book 'From Women to the World-Letters for a New Century' was published by Bloomsbury/IB Tauris in July 2021. It brings together the voices of diverse women in a collection that features Booker-prize nominated Elif Shafak, activist June Sarpong OBE, journalist Mariane Pearl, entrepreneur Annabel Karmel MBE, economist Vicky Pryce, film director Shamim Sarif, actress/activist Yasmine Al Massri, businesswoman Anousheh Ansari and others drawing attention to gender equality, homelessness, war, LGBTQ+ rights, mental health, COVID-19, the refugee crisis.

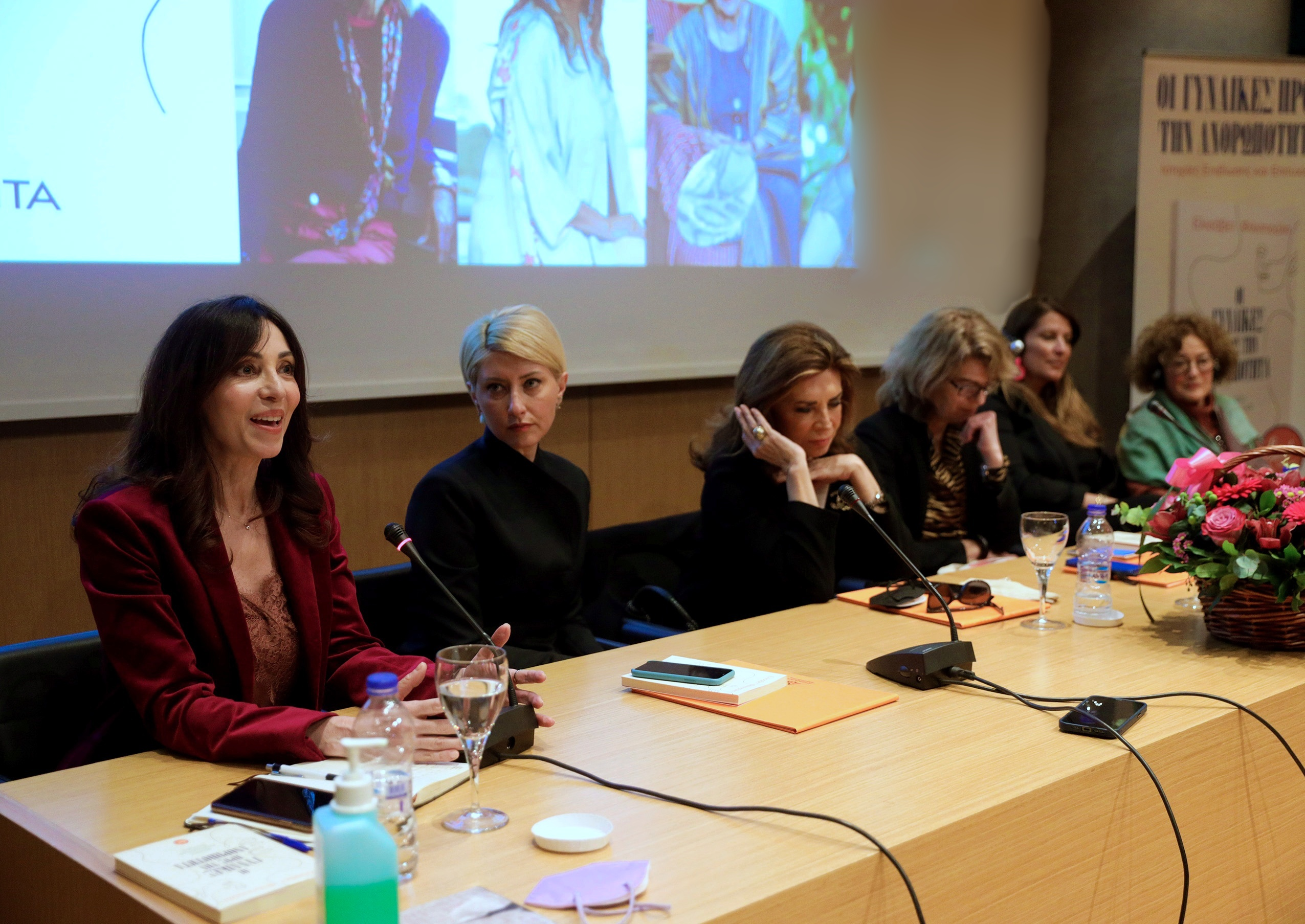
From Women To The World A Campaign on Women's Empowerment March 2022 Athens, Greece

The book received praise in the international press, Vanity Fair, The Independent, The New Arab and it was featured at the Hay Festival in May 2021 with excerpts read by actresses Kate Winslet, Juliet Stephenson, Suzanne Packer, Vanessa Redgrave, Louise Brealey.

The book was translated to Greek and included letters by well known Greek women Μιμή Ντενίση, Σία Κοσιώνη and Marianna Vardinogiannis.

== Theater work ==
In 2023, Filippouli adapted the play 'Alexander the Great: Between Myth and Imagination' for the British Library.

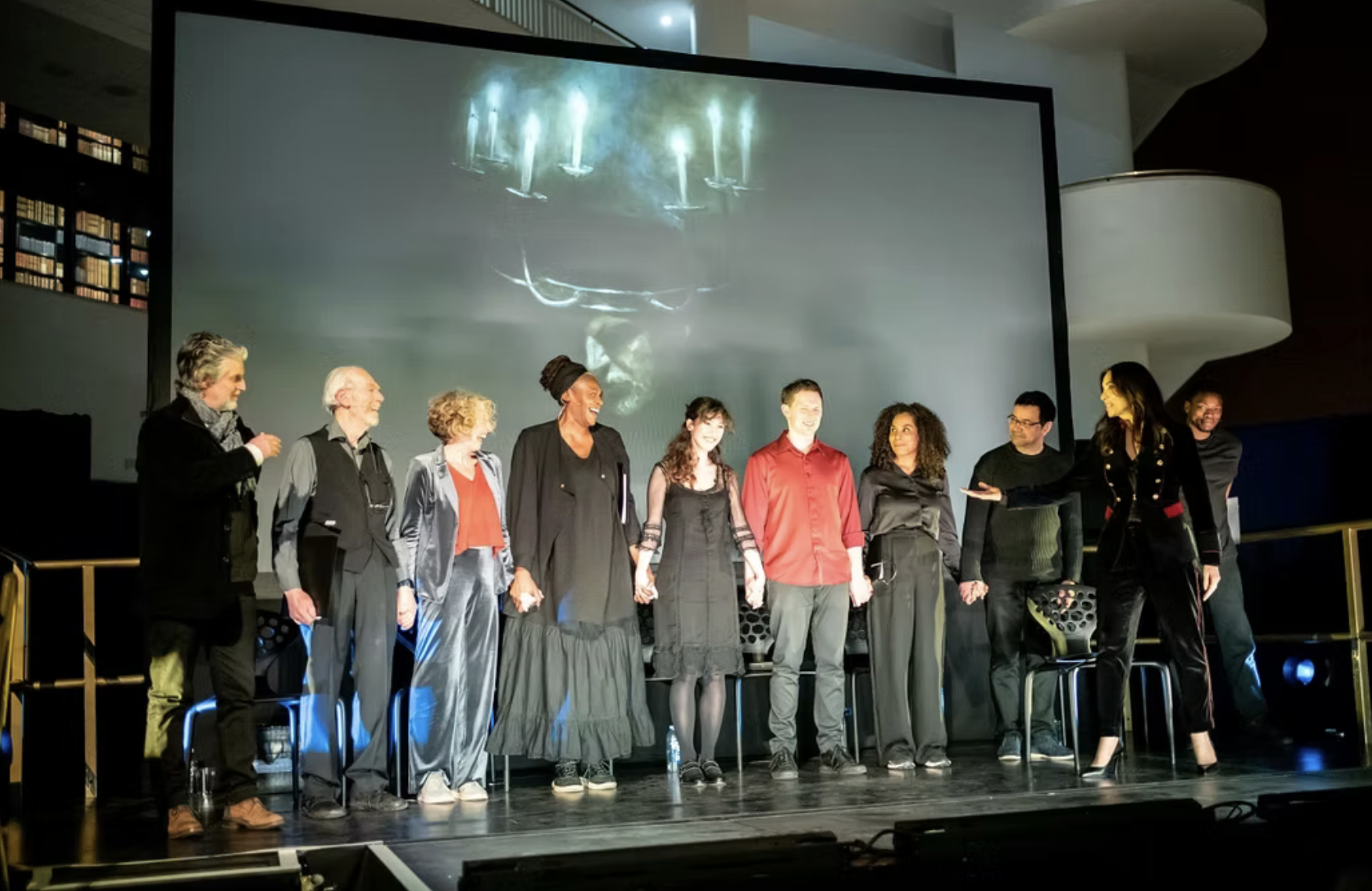
Alexander the Great-Between Dreams and Imagination British Library February 2023

The play was based on a modern Greek epic poem written by (Σταμάτης Φιλιππούλης), translated in English by Antony Stevens. She worked together with artist Paul Benney and Greek composer Stamatis Spanoudakis. In 2024 she was Executive Producer of the ‘FABULOUS CREATURES’ at the Arcola Theatre a play directed by Emily Louizou. In 2024 Filippouli began her collaboration with Belgian maestro Dirk Brossé.

== TedX Talks ==
Filippouli gave a TedX talk in 2017 at Stormont in Northern Ireland about the eternal clash between emotion and reason.

== Other affiliations ==
Filippouli has served on the Global Advisory Board of the Prince's Trust International supporting the launch of its programs in Greece, Jordan and Nigeria, and the International News Safety Institute and News Xchange.
