= Sharifu Kiragga Tusuubira =

Ugandan sickle cell advocate (born 1991)

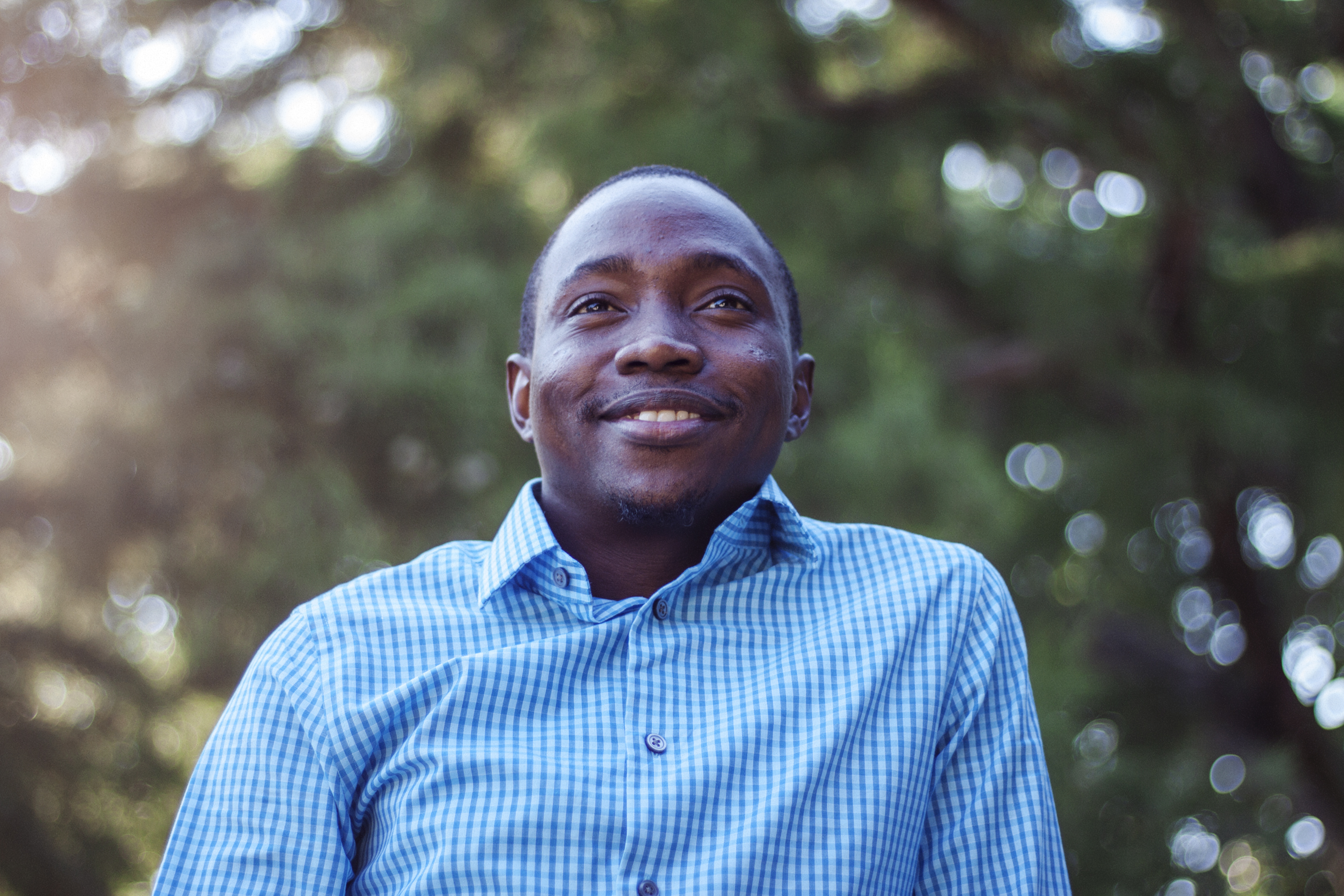
- Born: 4 January 1991 (age 35); Kampala, Uganda
- Education: Makerere University BS, MSc. University of Kansas PhD.
- Occupation: Biomedical scientist
- Known for: Sickle cell advocacy
- Awards: 100 Leaders of Impact (2021); International Sickle Cell Advocate of the Year (2020); Most Outstanding Community Outreach Award (2018)

Sharifu Kiragga Tusuubira (born 4 January 1991) is a sickle cell advocate in Uganda. He is best recognised for his role in starting community sickle cell screening. An initiative that enables people to take the sickle cell screening test and receive results instantly from the confines of their villages.

== Biography ==
Sharifu was born on 4 January 1991, in Kampala to Ashadu Zizinga Magatto (d. 2020), a health inspector and Ritah Bazanya, a police officer. Sharifu is a great grandson of Taibu Magatto, the first Katambala (Chief) of Butambala, the only county given to the Ugandan muslim community by the British Imperial Government in the 1900 Buganda agreement.

Sharifu received his bachelor's degree in biomedical laboratory technology from Makerere University in 2012. He later went on to graduate with a master's degree in biomedical laboratory science and management from the same university. In 2017, he attended the Civic Leadership Institute at Kansas State University. He was the first Executive Director of the Uganda Sickle Cell Rescue Foundation (USCRF) a non-profit organisation working to promote awareness, sensitisation and fighting Sickle Cell Disease in Uganda (a position he held until July 2019). In 2024, he graduated from the University of Kansas. He is a board member at the Uriel Owens Sickle Cell Disease Association of the Midwest.

== Sickle cell advocacy ==
Sharifu Kiragga Tusuubira is a strong proponent for and an advocate of sickle cell and disability rights in Uganda. His advocacy started while at Makerere University, following a moment of personal heartbreak wherein a lady he was in love with rejected him because of sickle cell. This motivated Sharifu to get involved and change the status quo of how the sickle cell was viewed.

Sharifu has advocated for people living with sickle cell disease to have rights to independent thinking, participate freely in community activities or further Agency and enjoy the same privileges as the ‘normal’ people in Uganda.

Living with sickle cell, Sharifu provides a firsthand narrative through his lived experiences to address issues of care, behaviour, stigma, and discrimination among persons with sickle cell in different locales. Sharifu reached over 60,150 people, set up 18 support networks and registered 20,153 across the Uganda. He was part of the team behind the Kabaka birthday run for sickle cell in Uganda(2017-2019), an initiative aimed at engaging communities in the sickle cell fight while raising funds to support the sickle cell programs.

Across the region, Sharifu has played a key role in supporting sickle cell advocacy. Sharifu was instrumental in the launch of the East Africa Sickle Cell Alliance. He is a co -founder of the Pan African Sickle Cell Federation International, an organisation working to promote sickle cell policy and advocacy across Africa. In 2017, Sharifu was selected as a Mandela Washington Fellow, as part of the Young African Leaders Initiative under the United States Department of State.

== Career ==
Sharifu's career started in 2009 at Makerere University College of Veterinary Medicine Animal Resource and Biosecurity where he worked as a research assistant until 2010. He then moved on to work as a Biomedical laboratory technologist in the same university and department from 2010 to 2012.

In 2012, he worked at the Central Public health laboratory, Ministry of Health. In 2013, he took on the role of Executive Director for the Uganda Sickle Cell Rescue Foundation, Kampala. In the same year, he also took on the role of Assistant Professor at the Institute of Allied Health Sciences at Clarke International University, Kampala.

== Awards ==
Sharifu is the pioneer recipient of the Clarke International University Most Outstanding community outreach award in 2018. In 2020, Sharifu received the International Sickle Cell Advocate of the Year (2020) award at the 7th Sickle Cell Advocates of the Year Awards courtesy of Sickle Cell 101. He has been named among the 100 Leaders of Impact in 2021 by the Global Thinkers Forum. He has been nominated for the Outstanding Young Alum award at the inaugural Alumni Impact Awards by the US Mission Uganda.
