= Bertrand Mak =

Hong Kong-based Entrepreneur

Bertrand Mak is a Hong Kong–based British artist, designer and entrepreneur of Chinese descent. He is the founder and chief creator of art and luxury brand Sauvereign as well as the proprietor of CrystallineTM, a gold leafing technique he had reinvented in 2012. His designs have been worn by notable people including Lady Violet Manners, Lady Amelia and Eliza Spencer, Zara Tindall, Olivia Colman, Kristin Scott Thomas, Maria Sharapova, Cillian Murphy, Brady Corbet, Mahira Abdel Aziz, Michelle Dockery, Natalia Vodianova, and Kieran Culkin.

== Education and career ==
Bertrand Mak attended Harrow School on an entrance music scholarship and won admission to the University of Cambridge. It was at Harrow where his interest in watches became the seed that grew into his career. After graduation, he worked as a management trainee for Louis Vuitton, subsequently joining Christie's as a watch specialist. In 2017, he founded R. Sanderson in collaboration with British shoemaker Rupert Sanderson, and in 2020, founded Sauvereign as an independent brand with stores in high-end luxury malls including Landmark, Elements, and Bellavita. In his current venture, he collaborates with international studios and figures including Zohiko, Wing Shya, Christopher Makos, Olivia Putman, Kari Voutilainen, and Zeng Fanzhi to create cross-disciplinary objects of wearable art.

== Notable projects ==
=== Art and Community ===
Bertrand Mak has several notable projects that contribute to culture as well as community:

Year	Nature of Project	Project Title
2017	Art Exhibition	Andy Warhol: Shadows in Hong Kong
2019	Art Exhibition	Andy Warhol: Shadows in Taipei
2019	Charity Fundraising	Creating Legends: Campaign to Support the End Child Sexual Abuse Foundation (ECSAF) founded by Josephine Siao
2022	Art Exhibition	Wing Shya: Colours of 1000 Gems
2022	Art Exhibition	Warhol Makos: Andy Loves Hong Kong
2023	Art Exhibition	Dualités: Mosaic of Details

=== Design at the Oscars ===
For the 96th Academy Awards in 2024, Bertrand Mak designed a bespoke brooch for the Oscar Winner of Best Actor, Cillian Murphy. The brooch, named HS14, was a unique piece expressively conceived and created for Murphy and inspired by the actor’s leading role in the cinematic masterpiece Oppenheimer. HS14 is made of solid 18K yellow gold, and was hand-cut, hand-finished, and assembled by Kari Voutilainen in Val-de-Travers, Switzerland.

In 2025, Bertrand Mak also designed a bespoke brooch for the Oscar Nominee of Best Picture, Director, and Original Screenplay, Brady Corbet, for his epic period The Brutalist at the 97th Academy Awards. The brooch, named Endeavour, was a unique piece custom-made in sterling silver for Corbet, inspired by the raw, geometric style of Brutalist architecture and a tribute to spomenik.

For a third year running, Bertrand Mak designed and created another bespoke brooch for the 98th Academy Awards, worn by the Oscars Winner of Best Supporting Actor, Kieran Culkin. Named Untitled 21, the brooch is a one-of-a-kind, 2-piece 18K yellow gold creation made again by Kari Voutilainen in Val-de-Travers. The abstract design is a brushstroke from the work of an unidentified contemporary Asian artist, composed of two distinct gestures realised by hand engraving and engine turning.

== Selected Interviews and articles ==
Published Date	Publication	Author	Article
June 12, 2014	Business of Fashion	Divia Harilela	Rupert Sanderson on Launching a Niche Brand in China
June 27, 2014	South China Morning Post	Divia Harilela	Bertrand Mak puts fine craftsmanship first in eponymous luxury brand
August, 2019	Prestige		Prestige 40 Under 40: Bertrand Mak, Entrepreneur
January 27, 2020	ELLE	June Chow	設計師專訪：R.Sanderson 創辦人Bertrand Mak
June 26, 2020	Hashtag Legend	Alyanna Payos	R. Sanderson rebrands as Sauvereign ahead of new campaign
September 25, 2020	POPBEE	Ashley Pang	被指「不懂得賺錢」？奢侈品牌 SAUVEREIGN 創辦人：不惜工本也要追求完美
October 6, 2020	Financial Times	Kate Youde	My Favourite Pieces: Bertrand Mak — 'Vintage is about scholarship and rarity, not money'
May 7, 2021	The Standard	Crystal Wu	Golden reverie
May 27, 2021	Tatler Asia	Rosana Lai	Bertrand Mak's Favourite Sauvereign Styles Involve Little Twin Stars and 24K Gold Leafs
May 30, 2021	Vogue Hong Kong	Simon Au	香港品牌能走向奢華格調？ Sauvereign 創辦人Bertrand Mak 分享獨有見解
August, 2021	Prestige		Prestige 40 Under 40: Bertrand Mak, Founder of Sauvereign
August 11, 2021	Ming Pao	沈晴	迷上鐘表工藝 創奢侈品牌 麥柏靈：客人不是潮流奴隸
November 18, 2021	South China Morning Post	Leona Liu	Yes, local Hong Kong fashion brands can be luxurious: Bertrand Mak on founding Sauvereign after designing for British shoe label Rupert Sanderson
February 24, 2022	Invest Hong Kong		"The bespoke experience in retail", Bertrand Mak shares his thoughts about "Tiny dot" - Hong Kong (video)
April 8, 2022	Harper's Bazaar	Kahlen Chen	走進稀有性的殿堂！繼金箔傳奇之後，那些SAUVEREIGN真正值得收藏的設計
May 24, 2023	Women's Wear Daily (WWD)	Miles Socha	Studio Putman Ventures From Interiors to Accessories
June 2, 2023	Robb Report	P. Ramakrishnan	Sauvereign and Studio Putman Celebrate Their Collaboration with "Dualités: Mosaic of Details" Exhibition in Hong Kong
June 6, 2023	Schön! Magazine	J. Bibi Cooper	sauvereign by studio putman
August 1, 2023	Hashtag Legend	Hill Choi Lee	Sauvereign By Studio Putman brings collab collection to Hong Kong
September 4, 2023	Retail in Asia	Manica Tiglao	Through Sauvereign, Bertrand Mak wants to put a Hong Kong-born art and luxury house on the global stage
October 26, 2023	When I was Young I Listen to the Radio 「口水多過浪花」with Do Do Cheng		我係你老師：古董錶收藏家~ BERTRAND MAK~ (radio)
March 10, 2024	The Hollywood Reporter	Laurie Brookins	Cillian Murphy Wears ‘Oppenheimer’-Inspired Brooch to the Oscars (Exclusive)
March 11, 2024	British GQ	Adam Cheung	Cillian Murphy's Oscars brooch was never meant to be at the Oscars
March 11, 2024	The Mirror	Tatiana Krisztina	Oscars' Winner Cillian Murphy's brooch had special meaning behind it
March 11, 2024	Esquire	Connie Chan	《奧本海默》影帝Cillian Murphy配戴港產胸針「HS14」登上奧斯卡寶座｜品牌SAUVEREIGN大有來頭
March 12, 2024	The Beat Asia	Alisa Chau	Cillian Murphy Wears Hong Kong-brand SAUVERIGN Accepting Best Actor Award
March 12, 2024	The Standard	Sophie Hui	Murphy's golden link to Hong Kong
March 13, 2024	Vogue Hong Kong	Junjie Wang	Sauvereign’s Bertrand Mak On Designing Cillian Murphy’s Oscars Brooch
March 13, 2024	New York Times	Guy Trebay	The Bro-Brooch Sweeps Award Season
March 2024	Gentlemen's Journal	Zak Maoui	The story behind Cillian Murphy's Oscars brooch
March 2024	Grazia Singapore	Zara Zhuang	CILLIAN MURPHY’S OSCARS JEWELLERY IS A SUBTLE NOD TO ‘OPPENHEIMER’
March 5, 2025	British GQ	Adam Cheung	How to make a big Hollywood brooch
April 11, 2025	VMan South East Asia	Dayne Aduna	MEET THE HONG KONG DESIGNER BEHIND HOLLYWOOD’S MOST STRIKING ACCESSORIES
May 9, 2025	The Times	Anna Murphy	China’s fashion revolution: the rise of luxury clothing in the east
June 19, 2025	Tatler Asia	Amrita Katara	Where did the guilloché engraving technique come from and how did it become haute horlogerie’s most coveted craft?
December 22, 2025	Forbes	Laia Farran Graves	How Men’s Jewelry Is Redefining Style In 2026
March 16, 2026	British GQ	Adam Cheung	The inside track on Kieran Culkin's very artsy Oscars brooch
August 26, 2026	The New York Times	Tina Isaac-Goizé	A Hong Kong Entrepreneur Creates 'Art to Wear'
August 27, 2026	Women's Wear Daily (WWD)	Tianwei Zhang	Sauvereign Taps Zeng Fanzhi for Art-inspired Collectibles and Experiences
