= Heavy Eco =

Estonian fashion brand

Heavy Eco is an Estonian prison fashion label. It is best known for being the first label combining sustainable fashion and criminals in Eastern Europe. The company was established in 2010 and is based in Tallinn, Estonia. The main idea behind it is to help rehabilitate criminals by letting them express their creativity and form strong work habits. The inmates are paid to produce the t-shirts (which are 100% organic cotton) and as a social enterprise 50% of the profits go toward supporting young homeless people, who are at risk of offending.

More than 200 convicts in Estonia and Latvia have joined this rehabilitation program, according to Slovakian TV. Some inmates said, in a Reuters interview, that it's a way to support their families and kill time in zona.
