= Abdulrahman Adel Al-Shammari =

Saudi poet (born 1974)

Abdulrahman Adel Rakan Aayed Al-Ra’d Al-Shammari
- Born: 1975 (age 50–51); Kuwait
- Education: High school
- Occupation: Poet

Abdulrahman Adel Al-Shammari (born 1974) is a Saudi poet. He was one of the notable participants in the first season of the television poetry competition Million’s Poet (2006–2007).

== Early life ==
Abdulrahman is the son of Adel bin Rakan bin Aayed Al-Ra’d, from the Lahalhah branch of the Al-Aslam tribe of the Shammar confederation. He is a Saudi poet, born in the State of Kuwait in 1974, and currently resides in his hometown of Hafar al-Batin in Saudi Arabia. He began writing poetry at the age of fifteen and is proficient in classical Arabic poetry, as well as Nabati and Farati (Iraqi) dialects.

== Poetic contributions ==
He participated in the first season of the television competition Million's Poet, where he secured third place. He is known for composing both classical Arabic poetry and Nabati poetry. He has taken part in various local poetry festivals across different regions of Saudi Arabia and the Gulf. He holds a high school diploma. His first public poetry appearance was in 1991 during a graduation ceremony for volunteers in Hafar al-Batin, following his participation as a volunteer during the Iraqi invasion of Kuwait.
