= Dhaffer L'Abidine =

Tunisian actor (born 1972)

- ظافر العابدين
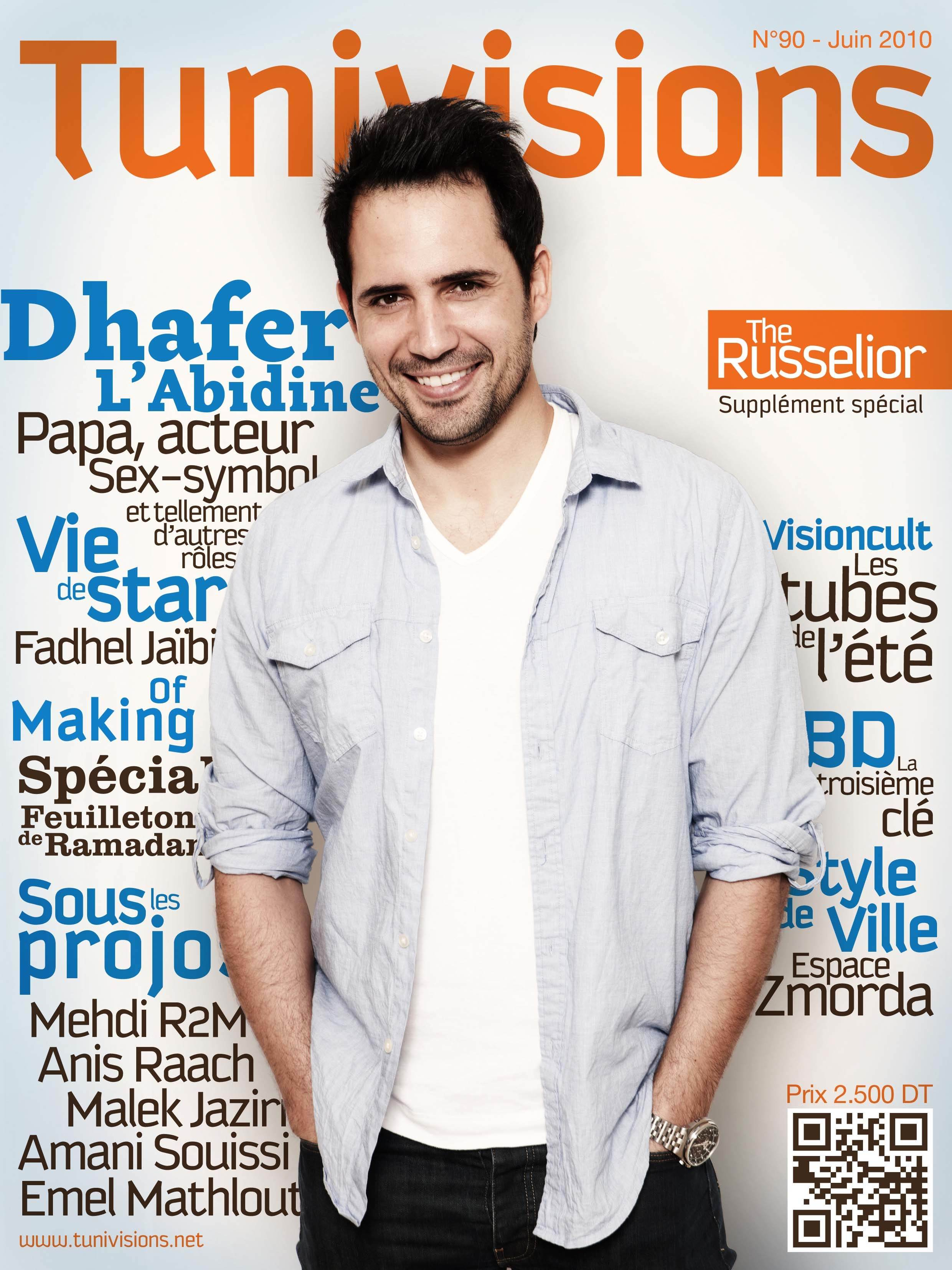
- Dhafer on the June 2010 cover of Tunivisions.
- Born: 26 November 1972 (age 53); Tunis, Tunisia
- Education: Birmingham School of Acting
- Occupation: Actor
- Website: www.dhaferlabidine.com

Dhafer L'Abidine (Arabic: ظافر العابدين, also spelt Dhaffer L'Abidine, Zafer El-Abedin and Dhafer El Abidine; born 26 November 1972) is a Tunisian actor.

== Biography ==
Dhafer made his acting debut in the UK after graduating from the Birmingham School of Acting. He starred in Sky One's Dream Team, BBC's Spooks and ITV's The Bill. He also starred in "The Mark of Cain" as Omar Abdullah and in A Hologram for the King. He became famous in Tunisia after playing the role of "Dali" in a Tunisian series called "Maktoub". He later went on to participate in dramas in the Arab world, notably in Egypt, the UAE, and Lebanon, including shows and series such as "Taht Al Saytara", "Prince of Poets", and "Arous Beirut"

He was voted Best Actor in the Arab World for 2017 by Sayidaty magazine.

In November 2018, he was part of the jury led by Bille August at the 40th Cairo International Film Festival.

== Filmography ==
=== Films ===
- Mark of Cain
- Children of Men (2006)
- The Da Vinci Code (2006)
- The Gems Merchant
- The Hunt Feast
- Marie la Fille de Son
- Le Rendez-Vous
- 31 North 62 East (2009)
- Sex and the City 2 (2010)
- A Hologram for the King (2016)
- Abu Shanab
- Habet Caramel
- The Spider (2022)
- asbet alf lila wa lila
- Anf wa Thalath Uyoon :A Nose and Three Eyes(2023)
- Palestine 36 (2025)

=== Television ===
- Hunted (2012)
- Benidorm (as Mohammed) (from Series 5, March 2012)
- Casualty (from Series 26, September 2011)
- Spooks 5 (episode 6&7)
- Prince of Poets (presenter, 2007)
- Voyages of Discovery
- The Message
- The Bill
- Doctors (BBC, 2005)
- Bombshell Ramon Jim Loach Shed Productions
- Brothers Kais (Regular) Hamadi Arafa RTT Tunisia
- 2009 - 2013 : Tunis 2050 : Bilel
- Dream Team (2 series) Marcel Sabatier (Regular) Various Sky Television
- Wire in the Blood 2
- First Love
- Maktoub (4 Saisons) (as Dali Naji) (Prod. Cactus Of Sami Fehri RTT Tunisia)
- Vertigo (Egyptian Ramadan 2012 series)
- The Bible - Uriah the Hittite
- Niran Sadiqa (Egyptian ... Ramadan 2013 series)
- The Cube (Dubai TV, 2014)
- Transporter: The Series
- Taht Elsaytara (Egyptian Ramadan 2015 series)
- Al khourouj - The Exit (Egyptian Ramadan 2016 series)
- Halawet el Donia (Egyptian Ramadan 2017 series)
- Caramel (Ramadan 2017 series)
- eugenie nights (Ramadan 2018 series)
- The Looming Tower (miniseries) (2018 Hulu Network)
- Arous Beirut (2019 series)
- Finding Ola (Netflix series, Season 2, 2024)

== Awards ==
- Best Arab Actor Award for Halawet El Donia at the Murex d'Or in 2018
- Best Actor Award at the Rotterdam Arab Film Festival for his performance in Ghodwa
