= Hissa Hilal =

Saudi Arabian poet

Hissa Hilal (Arabic: حصة هلال) is a Saudi Arabian poet. Previously published under the pseudonym Remia (Arabic: ريميه), she gained fame outside the Arab world in 2010 when she recited a poem against fatwas on Million's Poet, an Emirati reality television poetry competition, and became the first woman to reach the program's finals.

== Early life and work ==
Hilal, whose full name is Hissa Hilal al-Malihan al-‘Unzi, was born in the northwest of Saudi Arabia, near Jordan, in a Bedouin community, and began writing poetry at the age of 12, including on the themes of writing and justice. She hid her poetry from her family, who did not approve. She went to high school in Bahrain, where she encountered classic English literature, but was not able to attend university for financial reasons.

Hilal was able to have some of her poems published in Saudi newspapers and magazines while working in a clerical position in a hospital in Riyadh, using the money from her first sales to buy a fax machine so that she could write arts articles from home. Hilal worked as an editor and correspondent for a number of newspapers and magazines in Saudi Arabia and the Persian Gulf region, and was also the poetry editor of al-Hayat. She published two poetry collections, The Language of the Sand Heap (1993) and The Bedewed One. During this time, she wrote under the pseudonym "Remia."

Hilal says that marrying gave her more creative freedom from her family, and that her four children are a source of stability. Her husband is also a poet. Hilal had wanted to compete on earlier seasons of Million's Poet, but her husband, while not refusing her the written permission that she as a Saudi woman would need to travel outside the country, was hesitant to grant it. It was for the fourth season that he gave her permission.

== Million's Poet ==
I have seen evil from the eyes
of the subversive fatwas,
In a time when what is permitted
is confused with what is forbidden.

— Hissa Hilal, "The Chaos of Fatwas," 2010

Hilal and her poetry were praised enthusiastically by both the judges and the audience of Million's Poet. One judge said, "Her strength lies in the invention of images...Her poetry is powerful. She always has a message and a strong opinion, even on controversial subjects." Hilal's most famous poem from the competition was "The Chaos of Fatwas." It criticized in rhymed dactyls the "barbaric" clerics that run her country, condemning the violence and restrictions of rights precipitated by their fundamentalist stance. The poem was seen as responding specifically to recent remarks by Sheikh Abdul-Rahman al-Barrak which called for supporters of sex integration to be put to death. Hilal received death threats online for this poem. She says that she uses provocative language and imagery in her poems, such as a description of fundamentalist clerics that evokes an image of suicide bombers, because "extremism is so strong and you cannot talk about it in any other way." Hilal's poem the subsequent week was 15 verses on a similar theme, and won her the top score of the round, a place in the final, and the judges' praise for her courage.

Hilal's poem in the penultimate round said that media, a topic which the judges chose, could be used to fight ignorance and censorship. "I join the birds of light in a battle of enlightenment, we want to rise with a world that is fighting its ignorance."

Hilal came in third place in the competition, winning 3 million dirhams and prompting more women audience members to attend the final than ever before. Her final entry was an address from the poet to her poems: "You have a waving wing / You will not be betrayed by your open skies." She received the highest score from the panel of judges, which counts for 60% of a contestant's final score, but did not gain enough of the audience vote to win the contest.

The Independent writes that "Million's Poet is a particularly remarkable venue for her message given the conservatism of its format," which promotes traditional poetry and may reach a wider and more conservative audience than more Western-influenced talent shows; because the genre is respected and traditional, the content is able to push boundaries. Hilal adds that since extremist clerics are able to hold support by using "the religious terms and expressions that are deep-rooted in everyone's psyche," moderates should counter them using similar rhetoric rather than a modern language that people will not relate to. Analysts have suggested that this poetry form is increasingly being used to discuss social problems and that Hilal's participation will likely further that trend.

Hilal's appearance on the program wearing niqab was noted in the media. She stated that she did this so that her male relatives, who support her poetry, would not be criticized by other men, and that she hoped her daughters would not have to cover their faces. Hilal said that her experience wearing niqab while traveling outside Saudi Arabia was part of what led to the composition of "The Chaos of Fatwas"; the negative reactions she received from westerners made her think of how extremists of her own religion have given all Muslims a bad name.

== Later work ==
After participating in Million's Poet, Hilal published several more books.

Divorce and Kholu' Poetry: A Reading of the Status of Women in Tribal Society and Nabati Poetry as a Witness (2010) is a collection of poems written before 1950 by Bedouin women. Hilal edited the collection, which she sees as demonstrating the freedom of speech and autonomy in family matters that women in Saudi Arabia had in former generations. The book contains poems by fifty women poets from different Bedouin tribes and is made up of two sections, "The Right of Choice" and "Rejection and Resistance." The poems' date of composition varies, with the oldest over two centuries old and the newest about forty years. Hilal says of this book, "Tribal women used to recite poetry requesting a divorce, and when their husbands heard it, they would divorce them." Many of the poems in the book were first collected by Abdallah ibn Raddas in the 1950s and 1960s and are based on stories from the oral tradition about women who sought separation from their husbands, whether out of desire for independence and free expression, frustration with a husband, or overbearing or sexist in-laws, or who were strong-willed in their response to divorce orders initiated by husbands. Hilal's anthology runs counter to the prevailing idea that modern society is more civilized than the tribal society of older days, and illustrates differences between gender roles in Bedouin desert communities and in the urban communities that came to dominate.

Enlightenment (2011) is a compilation of Hilal's poems from the past decade, and includes "The Chaos of Fatwas."
