= Mahira Abdel Aziz =

Emirati producer and media personality

- مهيرة عبد العزيز
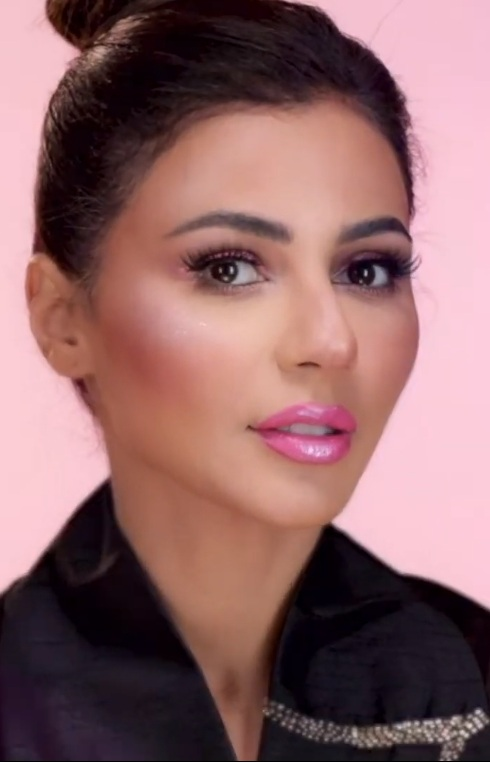
- Mahira Abdel Aziz, 2020
- Born: November 6, 1989 (age 37); Dubai, UAE
- Education: Royal Architectural Institute of Canada
- Occupations: Television presenter, actor
- Years active: 2005–present
- Notable work: Kalam Nawaem, Million's Poet

Mahira Abdel Aziz (Arabic: مهيرة عبد العزيز) (b. 1989) is an Emirati architect, TV presenter, and actor. She began her media career as a Business news correspondent for CNBC Arabiya before transitioning to host the Morning Show on Al Arabiya. She later hosted a women's show and then her own talk show on MBC. Abdel Aziz received the Best Economic Show Award in the GCC and was selected by the Mohammad Bin Rashid Foundation to host the annual Arab Hope Makers event. She worked closely with the UN on several initiatives, such as visiting Syrian refugee camps in Lebanon. In addition to her media work, she has partnered with numerous international fashion, beauty, and luxury brands. In 2020, she expanded her career into acting with a role in the acclaimed Netflix series Al Manassa. She subsequently starred in the major Emirati film production, Al Kameen. She was also chosen by TikTok as the first presenter to host an educational show under the global initiative LearnOnTikTok.

== Biography ==
Abdel Aziz was born in Dubai, United Arab Emirates, to an Emirati father and an Egyptian mother. She earned a Master's degree in architecture from Royal Architectural Institute of Canada, and her thesis won the RAIC Gold Medal. She was married to Lebanese businessman Khaled Ezzedine. The couple welcomed a daughter, Yasma, before announcing their separation in January 2025.

== Career ==
=== Media ===
Abdel Aziz launched her media career as an economics anchor on CNBC Arabia before transitioning to Al Arabiya. There, she not only anchored economic news but also hosted On the Spot, a program specializing in real estate. Her expertise led her to cover major international forums, including the World Economic Forum in Davos, the Dead Sea Forum, and OPEC meetings in Vienna, where she conducted high-profile interviews with figures such as Mohamed Alabbar, Sheikh Ahmed bin Saeed, Dan Brown, Queen Rania, and Queen Silvia of Sweden.

Her hosting portfolio expanded significantly over the following decade. She began presenting Sabah Al Arabiya in 2012 and joined the popular talk show Kalam Nawaem as a co-host in 2017. The following year, she was selected by the Mohammed bin Rashid Foundation to host the annual Hope Makers event, a role she held for three consecutive seasons.

In 2019, she co-hosted the successful prank show Ramez in the Waterfall with Ramez Galal in Bali. In 2020, she launched her own talk show, Ghadan Ajmal on MBC, featuring guests like Yousra, Kosai Khauli, and Amr Youssef. In 2021, she was the first Arab presenter to host a show, Learn on TikTok, on the TikTok platform. That same year, she also presented the ninth season of Prince of Poets on Abu Dhabi TV.

=== Acting ===
Abdel Aziz launched her acting career with a role as a broadcaster in the first and third seasons of the series Selfie. Her breakthrough continued in 2019 with the role of Nora in the Shahid series Al Diva, followed by her portrayal of Sheikha in Netflix's three-part series Al-Manassa. That same year, she also portrayed Khudra Al-Sharifa in Al Wa'ad, an Arab series adaptation of Sirat Bani Hilal.

A significant milestone came in 2021 when she starred in Al Kameen, a major Emirati film directed by renowned international director Pierre Morel. The film depicts the ambush of an Emirati forces vehicle by enemy fighters.

She ventured into theater in 2022 with the play Casanova, featuring alongside Hassan El Raddad and Amr Youssef during Riyadh Season.

Abdel Aziz has achieved widespread acclaim for her leading role as Elaf in the 90-episode Saudi series Autumn of the Heart—an adaptation of the Turkish drama Paramparça—which aired on MBC. in 2025. That same year, she also joined the cast of the hit Netflix series Dubai Bling.
