= Al Kameen =

2021 Emirati action-war film

- Theatrical release poster
- Directed by: Pierre Morel
- Written by: Brandon Birtell; Kurtis Birtell
- Produced by: Derek Dauchy; Jennifer Roth
- Starring: Marwan Abdullah Saleh; Khalifa Al Jassem; Mohammed Ahmed
- Music by: Harry Gregson-Williams
- Production companies: AGC Studios; Image Nation Abu Dhabi
- Distributed by: Vox Distribution
- Release date: November 25, 2021
- Running time: 102 minutes
- Country: United Arab Emirates
- Language: Arabic
- Box office: $5.2 million

Al Kameen (الكمين Arabic, meaning "The Ambush") is a 2021 Emirati action-war film directed by Pierre Morel and written by Brandon Birtell and Kurtis Birtell. The film is based on the true story of a 2018 ambush of Emirati soldiers by insurgents. As of December 2021, it is highest-grossing Emirati and Arabic-language film ever in the UAE, grossing over $5 million worldwide.

Principal photography took place in the United Arab Emirates. The film was released on November 25, 2021. It is produced by AGC Studios and Image Nation Abu Dhabi and theatrically distributed by Vox Distribution.

== Plot ==
2018, during the Yemen War, United Arab Emirates Armed Forces soldiers based in Mocha are deployed on a mission. In the middle of a routine patrol, Emirati soldiers Ali Al-mismari, Bilal Al Saadi, and Al Hindasi are trapped in a valley by rebel combatants. In response, another squad of Emirati soldiers conducts a mission to rescue their compatriots.

== Cast ==
- Marwan Abdulla Saleh as Sergeant Ali Al-mismari
- Khalifa Al Jassem as Warrant Officer Bilal Al Saadi
- Mohammed Ahmed as Sergeant Al Hindasi
- Mansoor Alfeeli as Colonel Jamal Al Khatri
- Khalifa Albahri as Al Sayari
- Ibrahim Almusharaakh as Mansoor
- Hassan Yousuf as Abdulla Alblooshi
- Abdullah Bin Heider as Colonel Almazroui
- Ghanim Nasser as Opposition Leader
- Salem Altamimi as Sergeant Salem
- Saeed AlHarsh as Captain Saeed Al Shehhi
- Mahira Abdel Aziz

== Production ==
Harry Gregson-Williams composed the film’s musical score. Drone filming was provided by Airscope Drones.

Al Kameen was filmed by a 400-member crew and cast, making it the largest Arabic-language feature film production filmed in the Gulf Cooperation Council (GCC). The film crew included a team of Emirati filmmakers and cultural consultants, including directors Hana Kazim, Talal Al Asmani, Aliwiya Thani and Alia AlQemzi. It was produced by AGC Studios and Image Nation Abu Dhabi.

== Release ==
The film opened in the UAE on November 25, 2021, and became the biggest UAE opening of 2021 and highest-grossing Emirati and Arabic-language film ever in the UAE.
