= Victoria Budson =

American feminist

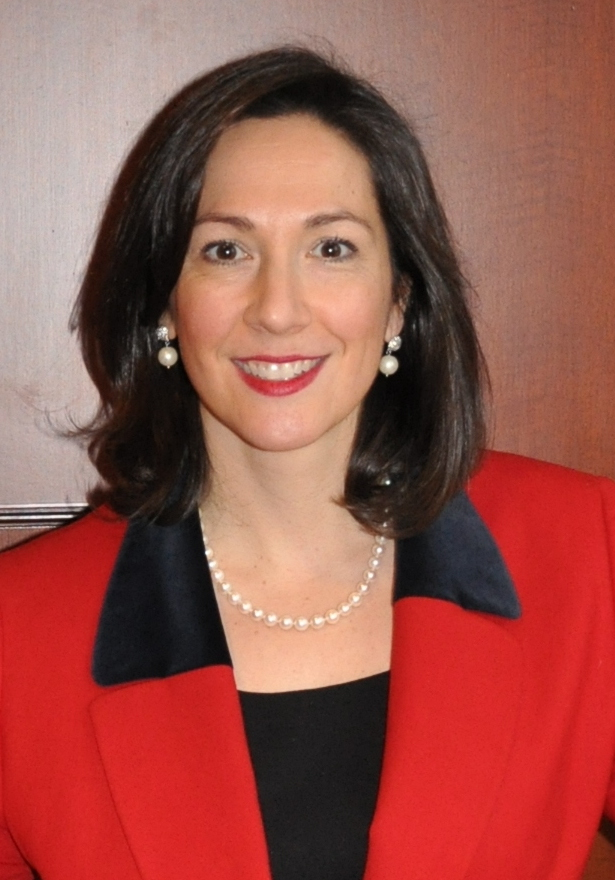
- Victoria A. Budson
- Born: Victoria A. Budson
- Education: Wellesley College
- Website: https://www.hks.harvard.edu/centers/wappp/about-us/people-at-wappp/executive-director

Victoria A. Budson is the founding executive director of the Women and Public Policy Program (WAPPP) at the John F. Kennedy School of Government at Harvard University in Cambridge, Massachusetts. WAPPP closes gender gaps in economic opportunity, political participation, health and education by creating knowledge, training leaders and informing public policy and organizational practices. Budson founded and chairs "From Harvard Square to the Oval Office: A Political Campaign Practicum", a non-partisan initiative of the Women and Public Policy Program that provides a group of Harvard graduate students with the training and support they need to ascend in the electoral process at the local, state and national levels.

== Biography ==
Budson graduated magna cum laude and with Departmental Honors from Wellesley College with a joint degree in Sociology and Women's Studies. As a graduate of the John F. Kennedy School of Government, Mid-Career Masters in Public Administration Program, she received the Lucius N. Littauer Fellow award for her distinction in academics at the Kennedy School, her contribution to the Kennedy School and the greater Harvard community, and her potential for continuing leadership excellence. For her work in closing gender gaps, Victoria was named one of CNN's "Ten Visionary Women" and a member of Boston Magazine's "Power Class". Budson serves as chairwoman of the Massachusetts Commission on the Status of Women, to which she was appointed by Massachusetts Governor Deval Patrick. The commission is an independent state agency created in 1998 to advance Massachusetts women to full equality in all areas of life and promote their rights and opportunities. The commission is made up of 19 members who are appointed by the governor, Senate president, speaker of the House of Representatives, and the Caucus of Women Legislators. Budson is an appointed member of the Boston Mayoral Women's Workforce Council, the first of its kind in the country, that makes recommendations on policy and workplace proposals to help women in the workforce. Budson is also a member of the Women in Public Service Project Institute Planning Committee. The Project, an initiative founded by the Seven Sisters Colleges Barnard College, Bryn Mawr College, Mount Holyoke College, Smith College, and Wellesley College in partnership with the U.S. Department of State, aims to educate a new generation of women committed to public service, create an infrastructure of support and mentoring, and help enable more women to enter public service and political leadership. Before coming to Harvard, Budson was the Political and Community Affairs Director for Steve Grossman. Budson has also worked extensively in Massachusetts’ politics, both as an activist and an elected official on the state and local levels.

Budson is a frequent commentator for news publications, television, and radio programs. Recently, she has participated in discussions on pay discrimination in the workplace at the Center for American Progress and the White House Working Families Summit. Her other appearances include: New York Times, USA Today, the Boston Globe, U.S. News & World Report, and National Public Radio.
