= Organic cotton =

Cotton grown organically from non-GM plants

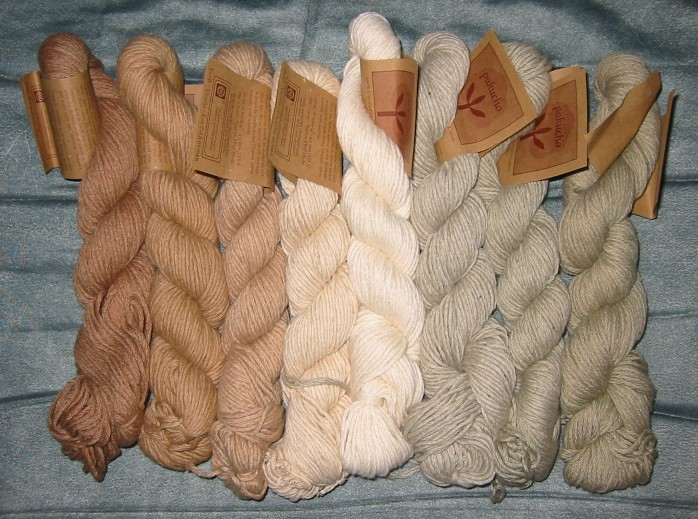
Organic cotton yarn

Organic cotton is generally defined as cotton that is grown organically in subtropical countries, such as India, Turkey, China, and parts of the USA, from non-genetically modified plants, and without the use of any synthetic agricultural chemicals, such as fertilizers or pesticides aside from the ones allowed by the certified organic labeling. Its production is supposed to promote and enhance biodiversity and biological cycles. In the United States, cotton plantations must also meet the requirements enforced by the National Organic Program (NOP) from the USDA in order to be considered organic. This institution determines the allowed practices for pest control, growing, fertilizing, and handling of organic crops.

As of 2007, 265,517 bales of organic cotton were produced in 24 countries and worldwide production was growing at a rate of more than 50% per year. In the 2016/2017 season, annual global production reached 3.2 million metric tonnes.

== Ecological footprint ==
Cotton covers 2.5% of the world's cultivated land but uses 10-16% of the world's pesticides (including herbicides, insecticides, and defoliants), more than any other single major crop. Environmental consequences of the elevated use of chemicals in the non-organic cotton growing methods include the following:

- Chemicals used in the processing of cotton pollute the air and surface waters.
- Decreased biodiversity and shifting equilibrium of ecosystems due to the use of pesticides.

As is the case for any comparison between organic and "conventional" crops, care must be taken to standardise by yield rather than land area. Like many crops, yields (per hectare) in organic cotton farms are typically significantly lower compared to conventional methods; this yield gap means that the water used to produce the same amount of cotton fibre can in fact be higher in organic, compared to conventional cotton cultivation.

=== Water use ===
Evaluating the water footprint of organic cotton requires distinguishing between different water sources: "green water" (rainwater stored in soil) and "blue water" (freshwater drawn from rivers, lakes, or groundwater for irrigation). While life-cycle assessments (LCAs) based purely on yield metrics sometimes show higher total water consumption for organic cotton due to lower yield per hectare, organic production relies more heavily on rain-fed agriculture. According to Textile Exchange, approximately 80% of global organic cotton is grown in rain-fed regions, substantially reducing its reliance on "blue water" extraction compared to conventional systems.

Additionally, organic farming practices—such as compost application, cover cropping, and reduced tillage—increase soil organic matter. Higher organic matter improves the soil's water-holding capacity, reducing surface runoff and evaporation while improving crop resilience during drought conditions. In irrigated organic systems, the adoption of drip irrigation further mitigates water loss compared to traditional flood or furrow irrigation.

== Pesticides ==
USDA-certified organic cotton is grown without the use of synthetic pesticides. However, organic growers are able to use a suite of organically approved pesticides, including pyrethrins from plant material, copper sulfate as a molluscicide and fungicide, and a range of insecticidal soaps, among others. Application rates of organic pesticides can often exceed those in conventional cultivation systems due in part to the large yield deficits in organic cropping systems, and organic pesticides can be at least as toxic as their conventional counterparts.

By comparison, conventional cotton can be grown using a range of synthetic pesticides. Fields converted from conventional use to organic cotton must be tested to assure no residual pesticide with a transition period of 2–3 years in this process. In some cases, companies have taken to testing for pesticide residual of fiber or fabric themselves to assure cheating does not occur on the part of the farmers or farm coops. Use of insecticides, herbicides, fertilizers, and water have all declined in conventional systems as a direct result of the widespread adoption of genetically modified cotton, which in 2014 accounted for over 95% of cotton grown in the U.S., India and China. Organic certification prohibits use of genetically modified (GM) varieties.

== Distribution of organic cotton production ==
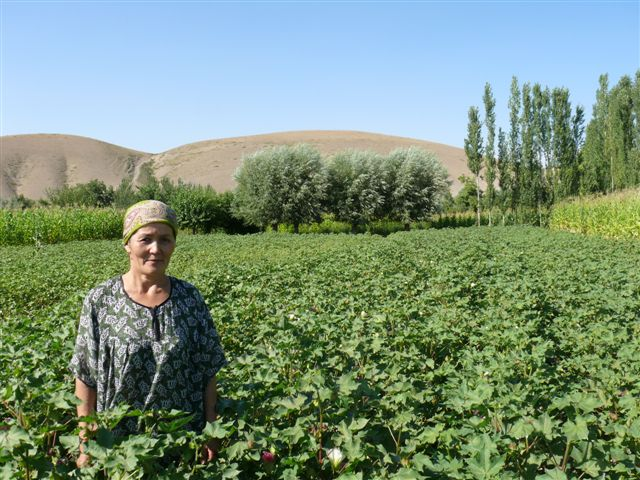
Organic cotton farmer in Kyrgyzstan

As of 2018, organic cotton is only 1-2% of global cotton production. The largest producers are India (51%), China (19%), Turkey (7%) and Kyrgyzstan (7%). Organic cotton production in Africa takes place in at least eight countries. The earliest producer (1990) was the SEKEM organization in Egypt; the farmers involved later convinced the Egyptian government to convert 400,000 hectares of conventional cotton production to integrated methods, achieving a 90% reduction in the use of synthetic pesticides in Egypt and a 30% increase in yields.

Various industry initiatives aim to support organic growers, and various companies, including Nike, Walmart, and C&A incorporate organic cotton as part of their supply chains The United States Organic Trade Association states that the Global Organic Textile Standard (GOTS) is considered the world's leading certification of organic fibers.

== See also ==
- Fair trade
- Sustainable clothing
- Sustainable fashion
- Organic clothing
