= Ibrahim Abouleish =

Egyptian chemist and medical researcher (1937–2017)

- إبراهيم أبو العيش
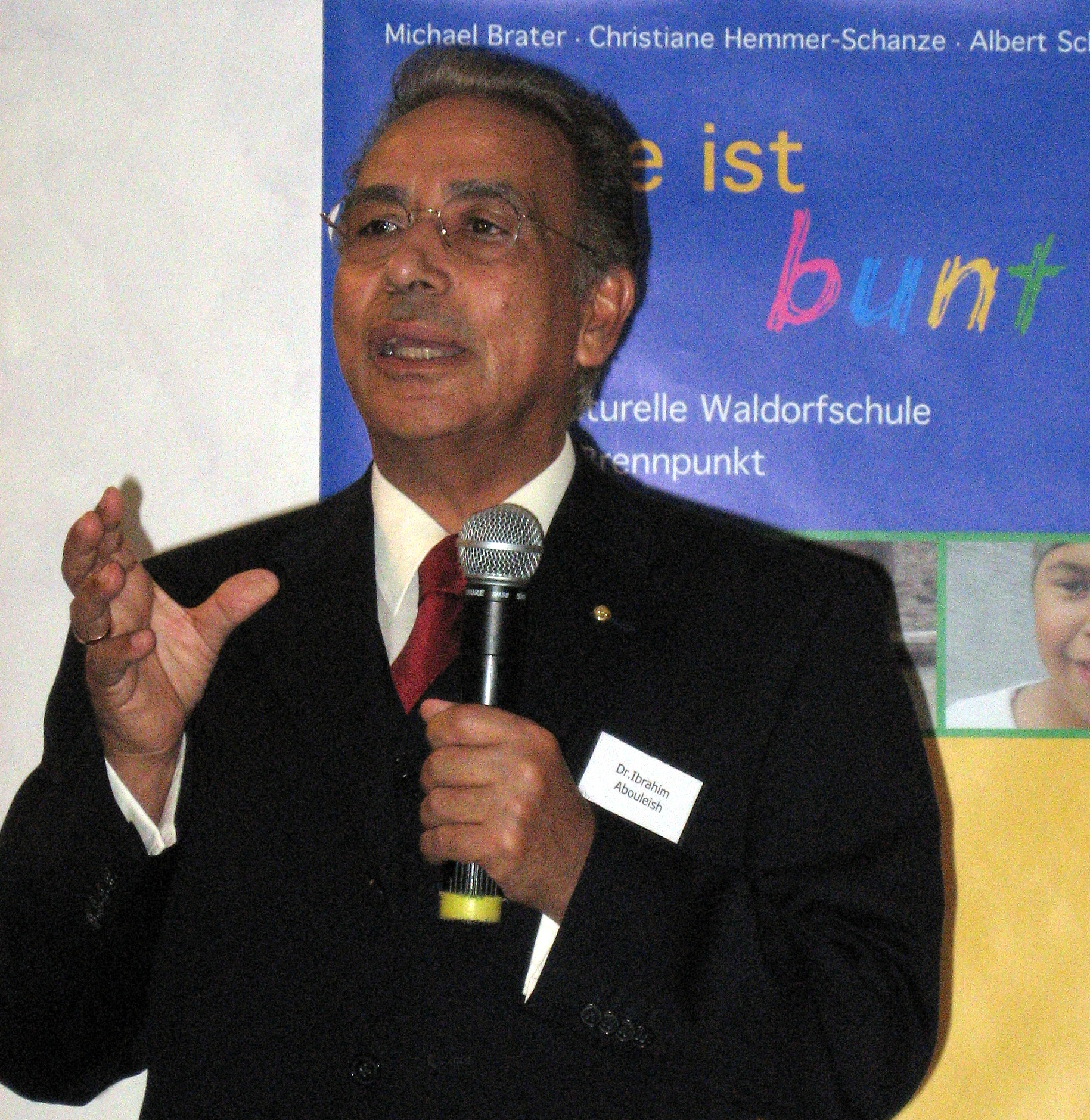
- Abouleish in 2007
- Born: 23 March 1937; Mashtul, Egypt
- Died: 15 June 2017 (aged 80); Egypt
- Occupation: Pharmaceutical
- Known for: SEKEM
- Awards: Right Livelihood Award

Ibrahim Abouleish (Arabic: إبراهيم أبو العيش; 23 March 1937 – 15 June 2017) was an Egyptian philanthropist, drug designer and chemist. He began his chemistry and medicine studies at the age of 19 in Austria. He did his doctorate in 1969 in the field of pharmacology and then worked in leading positions within pharmaceutical research. During this time he was granted patents for a number of new medicines, especially for osteoporosis and arteriosclerosis.

In 1977 he returned to Egypt and founded the comprehensive development initiative SEKEM. The organisation began using biodynamic farming methods in Egypt, successfully demonstrating a model for sustainable agriculture on arid desert lands without requiring irrigation. Abouleish later expanded SEKEM to include a Waldorf school, a medical center, various businesses, and adult education initiatives ranging from vocational training to the establishment of Heliopolis University.

He was selected as an "Outstanding Social Entrepreneur" by the Schwab Foundation in 2004. In 2006 he was appointed as a councillor at the World Future Council. In 2012, Dr. Ibrahim Abouleish was appointed an Oslo Business for Peace Honouree, receiving his award at Oslo City Hall, from The Business for Peace Foundation. In 2013 he received the Global Thinkers Forum 2013 Award for Excellence in Positive Change. In 2003, he was awarded the Right Livelihood Award for "a 21st century business model which combines commercial success with social and cultural development."
