= Kalam Nawaem =

- Also known as: Sweet Talk (English title)
- Genre: Talk show
- Presented by: Octavia Nasr; Fawzia Salama; Muna AbuSulayman; Rania Barghout; Mahira Abdel Aziz
- Country of origin: United Arab Emirates
- Original language: Arabic

Production
- Running time: 60 min

Original release
- Network: MBC

Kalam Nawaem (Arabic: كلام نواعم, English: "Sweet Talk") is a one-hour, female-hosted Arabic talk show that airs late Sunday evenings on the pan-Arab satellite network MBC 1. Premiering in 2002, it is credited with pushing social boundaries on Arab television. As of 2007, it was classed among the top-10 programs in the Arab world and commanded the highest ad rates on MBC. In a notable 2011 episode, the program hosted U.S. Secretary of State Hillary Clinton.

The show's format was inspired by the American television series The View and features four female hosts of different ages, Arab nationalities and points of view. The hosts are Muna AbuSulayman, Mahira Abdel Aziz, Sally Abdel Salam, Nadia Ahmad, Samar El Mogren and Hala Kadim. The show discusses controversial topics and taboos in the Middle East such as gender equality, terrorism, incest, sexual harassment, rape, child abuse, infidelity and divorce. The presenters also read correspondence from viewers. Parts of the show have been censored by MBC.

Some of the women have also shared their personal lives with the audience. In one episode, Besiso's then-boyfriend proposed to her on the show, and later Besiso allowed the program to document her pregnancy and televise the birth of her child.
