= Rafia Ghubash =

Prof. Rafia Ghubash
- Born: رفيعة غباش; Dubai, UAE
- Occupation: Professor
- Medical career
- Profession: Psychiatrist
- Field: Epidemiology
- Institutions: Arabian Gulf University
- Sub-specialties: Epidemiological psychiatry
- Research: Psychiatry; women's history

Rafia Obaid Ghubash is a Dubai psychiatrist and epidemiologist who serves as president of the Arab Network for Women in Science and Technology, and is a former president of the Arabian Gulf University. She is known as a role model of women's empowerment.

== Education and career ==
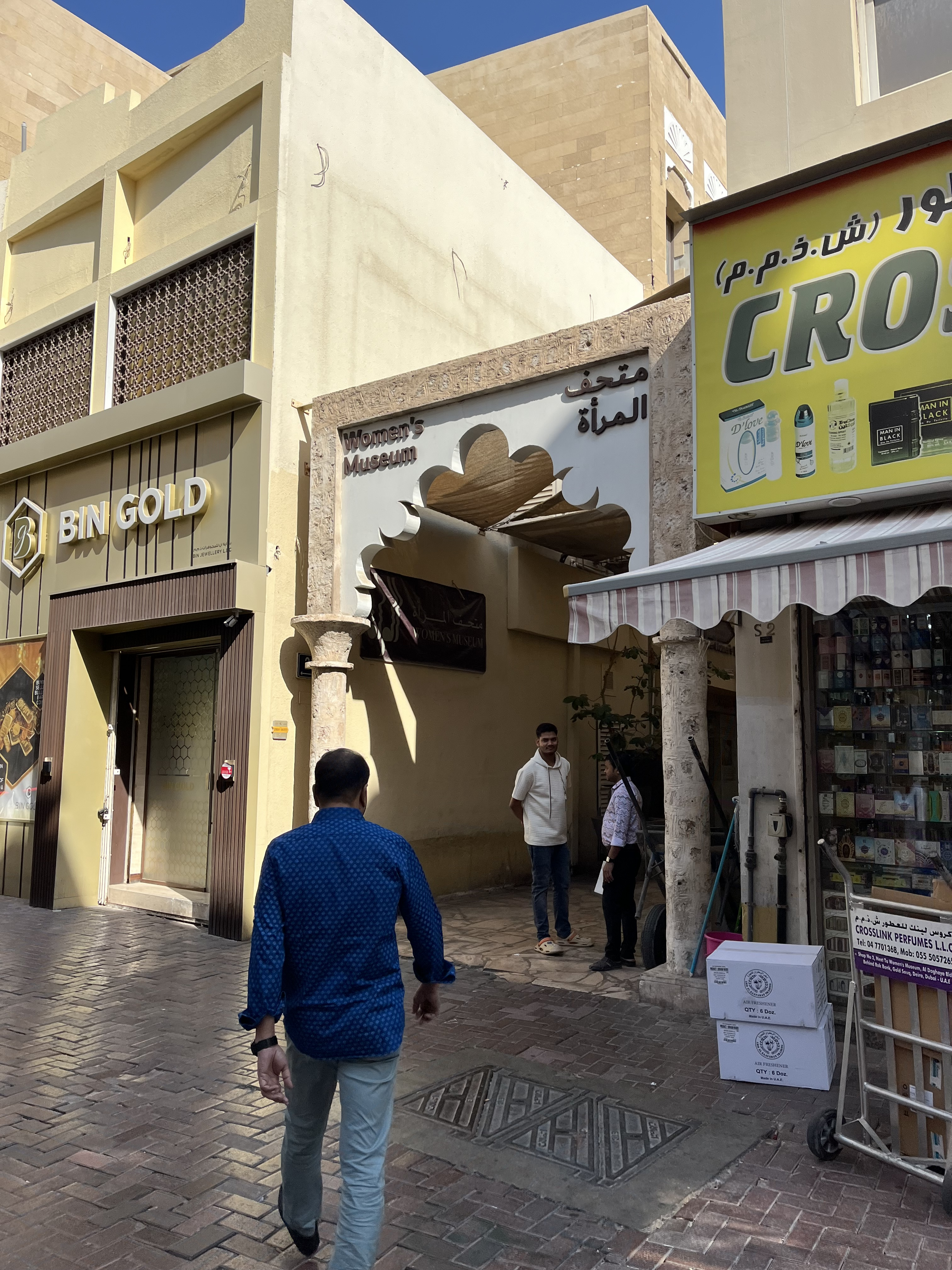
Bait Al Banat Women's Museum

Ghubash earned a PhD in Epidemiological Psychiatry from London University in 1992, becoming an assistant professor of psychiatry at UAE University School of Medicine, then newly opened, in Al Ain. She is a practicing psychiatrist.

She was president of the Arabian Gulf University in Bahrain during 2000-2009. She is president of the Arab Network for Women in Science and Technology, an organization to both help women scientists attain leadership positions and attract more women into science.

Dr. Rafia takes a strong interest in the education of Arab women, receiving an award for Middle East Women's Educational Achievement in 2002. In 2012, she opened Women’s Museum Dubai to display and honour the achievements of women in the UAE in various fields.

Ghubash was nominated to become a councilor for the World Future Council and became a council member in 2006.

In 2012, she founded The Women’s Museum, Bait al Banat (House of Women, in English) in her childhood home in Dubai.

Dr. Rafia Ghobash served as a judge for the Arab Women Award in 2017.

== Awards ==
- The Hamdan Award for individuals working in the field of medicine and health - 2003-2004.
- Middle East Women's Achievements - Education Award - offered by Datamatics Foundation - 2002
- Inspirational Arab Woman of the Year - 2015

== Books ==
- Alive after leaving "حضر بعد رحيله": a biography about her late brother Dr. Hussein Ghobash - published by Kalemat Kuwait
- A Woman before her time "امرأة سبقت عصرها": a book about the late poet Ousha Bint Hussein Lootah - self published
- Encyclopedia of an Emirati Woman "موسوعة المرأة الإماراتية": co-authored with Mariam Sultan Lootah in 2018 - published by The Women's Museum
