= Muna AbuSulayman =

Saudi businesswoman and activist (born 1973)

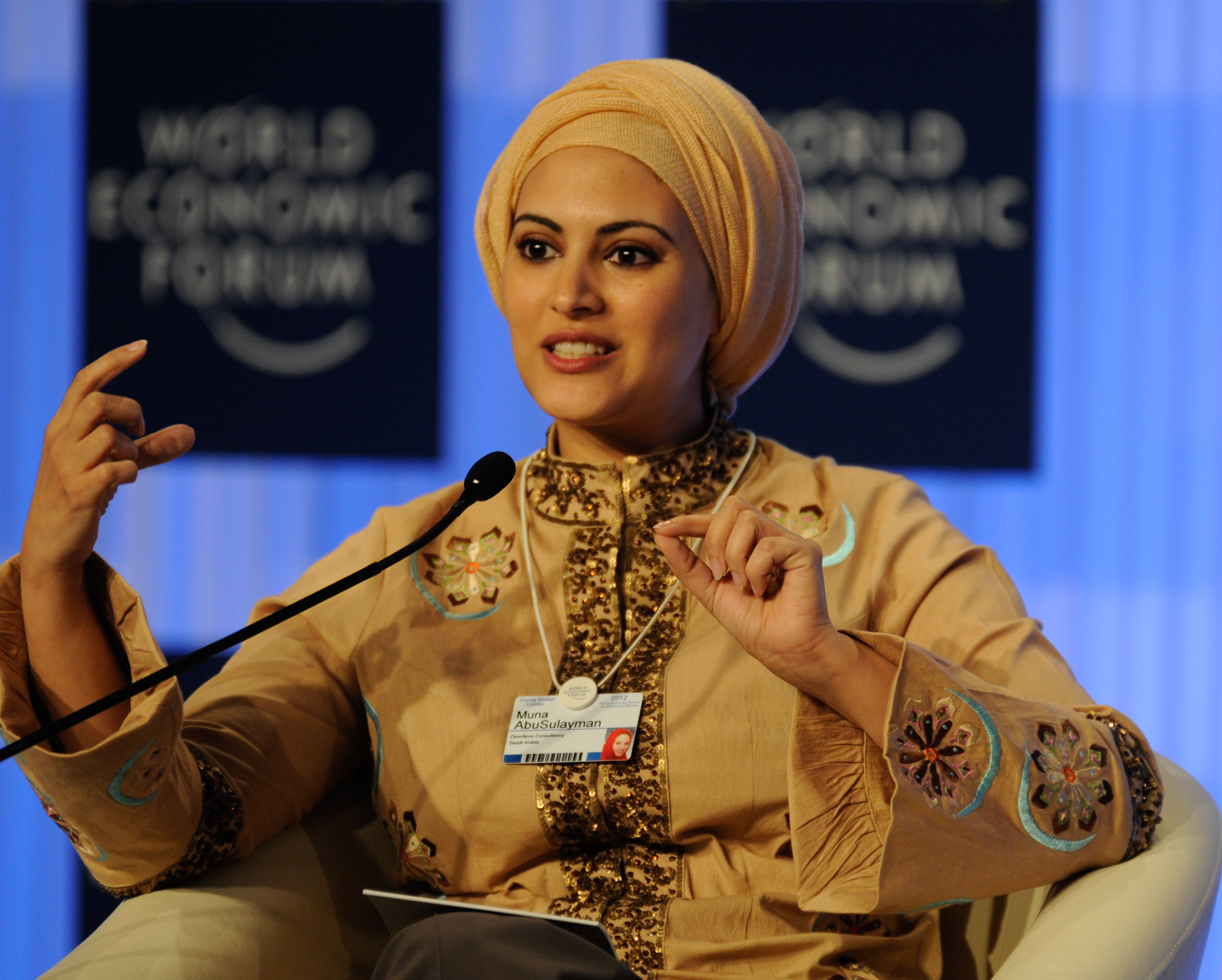
- Muna AbuSulayman at the World Economic Forum on the Middle East, North Africa and Eurasia in 2012
- Born: 16 May 1973 (age 53); Philadelphia, Pennsylvania
- Education: George Mason University
- Occupations: MBC Co-host Kalam Nawaem (2002–2007); King Saud University Lecturer, English Department (1997–2004); Kingdom Holding, Executive manager of Strategic Studies and Research Initiatives (2004-2006); Alwaleed Bin Talal Foundation, Executive Director (2006–present)
- Notable credit: Kalam Nawaem (MBC) Co-host (2002–2007)
- Children: 2 daughters
- Website: www.munaabusulayman.com

Muna AbuSulayman, (Arabic: منى أبو سليمان; born 16 May 1973) is an American-born Saudi businesswoman and activist. She is also the former founding Secretary General of the Alwaleed Bin Talal Foundation, the philanthropic arm of Prince Alwaleed Bin Talal's Kingdom Holding Company and co-host of the Kalam Nawaem ("Speech of the Soft") television show on the satellite network MBC 1. In August 2013, AbuSulayman was announced as the Global Ambassador of Silatech.

In 2004, AbuSulayman was named a Young Leader by the World Economic Forum. In this capacity, she is often called upon to speak on issues related to challenges facing the youth around the world. In 2007, she became the first woman from Saudi Arabia to be appointed by the United Nations Development Program as a Goodwill Ambassador. As a goodwill ambassador she has championed humanitarian causes including the Tetanus Shot Campaign in 2011 for Yemen. In 2007, the Middle East Excellence Awards Institute presented AbuSulayman the Achievements in Regional and International Relations Award. In 2009, she was named one of the most influential Muslims in the world.

AbuSulayman reaches out to different audiences and appears in the news or as a panelist at the Davos World Economic Forum, Jeddah Economic Forum, C-100 of the World Economic Forum, Brookings Institution Conferences and other venues.

She is also a member of Soliya, an organization devoted to improving communications between East and West through university education. AbuSulayman also serves on the advisory board of Meedan, the premier content translation website service in the world for Arabic. Since 2004, AbuSulayman has also served as a volunteer director for the Friends of Saudi Arabia Association and remains a member of the Saudi Media Association.

== Early years ==
From elementary school through college and graduate schools, she lived between Saudi Arabia, Malaysia, and the United States.

== Education ==
AbuSulayman attended King Abdulaziz University in Saudi Arabia, International Islamic University Malaysia and George Mason University. She graduated in 1993 from George Mason University and holds a B.A. and M.A. in English literature. She is currently completing her Ph.D. in Arab American literature from King Saud University.

== Career ==
In terms of her media career, she founded and co-hosted the MBC TV social program Kalam Nawaem which is considered to have a viewership of tens of millions and is one of the most watched social programs by Arabs worldwide. Her role in the station was as a presenter and she mainly focused on the social segment of the program in which she tried to convey the message to the viewer in the best way possible.

In the corporate world AbuSulayman started working in Prince Alwaleed Bin Talal's Kingdom Holdings company. She served as the Executive manager of Strategic Studies and Research Initiatives. Prior to taking this post she had no experience in HR and administration and she had to learn everything in the first 6 months working for the company, but also gained personal experience while working together with Alwaleed. She does not deny The 'Alwaleed Effect' and says, smiling, "when I first joined, I asked His Royal Highness to provide me with some executive training as I had no business experience, so I was sent to take a few courses"; she then adds, "but I realized later that working with him was my real executive training".

In 2006 she took on the task of building the Alwaleed bin Talal foundation, previously known as Kingdom Foundation. This foundation is the philanthropic arm of the Kingdom Holding company. In this capacity, she is developing and implementing the foundation's mission, vision, and operations for strategic philanthropy and humanitarian assistance. She is responsible for the global philanthropic activities, projects, and donations that reach the globe. When asked about getting this job she said in an interview with Aljazeera English "I guess I did such a good job that he offered me the foundation".

== Criticism ==
AbuSulayman has received some criticism for being a woman engaged in public life.

== Islam and West dialogue ==
AbuSulayman described her work in this area in the Arab-U.S. policymakers conference by saying: "we work with Islam-West dialogue, which is one of the biggest areas. Four departments in the foundation and that's to help build bridges between Islam and the West through academic institutions. It is to bring objective intellectual academic work to the arena, to bring common sense and logic to the discussion, as we have seen that these two were lacking in the last eight years. We also fund a lot of initiatives like this conference and the organization of the National Council on U.S.-Arab Relations. We fund the rabbi's and imam's conferences, some leadership initiatives between Muslims and Western leaders so they can come to the table. Some of it is publicized, some not publicized."

AbuSulayman gave a lecture at Yale University where she talked about the misconceptions that the West has about Islam.

== Women empowerment ==
"When you change women's conditions and empower them, you change the whole family" said Muna in an article by arabianbusiness.com, she also said, Prince AlWaleed firmly believes that encouraging and supporting women and female initiatives is one of the most important ways to measure real tangible progress in any country. From this view stems her strong support for women empowerment in the world and especially in Saudi Arabia.

Talking about motherhood Muna said that the years mothers spend raising their children should be taken into consideration when they are applying for a job. Instead of starting as an intern or a novice employee, they should be starting as assistant managers with a certain salary. She justified this by saying that mothers gain a lot of experience raising children, they acquire skills like patience, multitasking and management, and these shouldn't be neglected by employers and should be compensated financially.

In an interview with the Saudi Gazette Muna said, "I want girls to see that there is almost no limitation to where they can go. The most important thing they can do is to work to be content, happy, married and to have children."

== Personal life ==
AbuSulayman shares the custody of her two children with her former husband. In an interview with the Saudi Gazette she said in order to help her children learn to use their time effectively there is a no-TV rule at home during the weekdays.

== Awards and recognition ==
- 2004, Young Global Leader by the World Economic Forum.
- 2005, Saudi UN Goodwill Ambassador, UNDP.
- 2007, Middle East Businesswomen & Leaders Achievement Award for her Achievements in Regional and International Relations.
- 2009, Named one of 500 Most Influential Muslims in the World.
- 2009, Excellence Arab women award, by the Arab Woman Studies Center
- 2009, Yale World Fellow.
- 2010, Colin Morley Award.
- 2019, Most Influential Person on Twitter, by The World Social Media Forum
