= Nabati =

Style of Arabic poetry

Nabaṭī (Arabic: الشعر النبطي), historically also known as Najdi, is a vernacular Arabic poetry that stems from the Arabic varieties of the Arabian Peninsula. It exists in contrast to the poetry written according to the classical rules of literary Arabic. Nabati poetry holds significant cultural value in Arabian society, offering insights into Bedouin life, values, and traditions. Unlike traditional Arabic poetry, which follows strict classical forms, Nabati is more accessible and informal, often composed in colloquial Arabic, allowing for a more intimate connection with its audience.

== History ==
Also known as "the people's poetry" and "Bedouin poetry", nabati has a long heritage, with examples of the nabati form referenced by the medieval historian Ibn Khaldun in his Muqaddimah (Introduction), first published in 1377. Bedouin poets composed verse similar in structure, theme, metre and rhyme to the works of Imru' al-Qais and other pre-Islamic poets. These qasida set the classical standard for hundreds of years. Until recently, verse composed by illiterate Bedouin masters of the art has remained close in spirit and language to these examples. Prominent historical nabati poets include Ibn Daher who lived in Ras Al Khaimah in the 16th century and whose work still influences the poetry today. Ibn Li'bun (1790–1831), known in the eastern coast of the Arabian Peninsula region as "Prince of the Nabati Poets", was also prominent figure in the form, who corresponded with other poets across the region and whose work has led to many traditional popular tunes in Arabia.

Nabati poetry arose in the 16th century as the Arabic dialect seeped its way into Bedouin speech in the Arabian desert. Many poets that lived in the desert lacked opportunities for a formal education and did not learn the classical Arabic structure of poems and therefore did not apply these ideas of structure and form to their own poetry. The Bedouins lived in tribes and were nomadic, mainly using animals as a source of transportation and livelihood. The nabati poems nowaday do not compare to the authenticity as it was written in the 16th century. This nomadic lifestyle influenced their poetry, making it difficult for sedentary scholars to understand the cultural milieu that informed their poems.

Nabati was long an aural tradition and researchers have encountered Bedouin who can memorise 20,000 poems.

An important cultural element in the daily life of the region, nabati poetry was used to declare war, seek peace and resolve tribal disputes. It is considered unique to Arabia. The form was a key element not only of regional culture but communications prior to the 20th century, but lapsed with the development of the region following the discovery of oil. It has enjoyed a considerable renaissance and is now a celebrated medium of both poetry and song, particularly in the UAE where practitioners such as Ousha bint Khalifa Al Suwaidi (known as Fatat Al Arab) have become celebrated figures.

In order to keep the nabati tradition and culture alive within the tribes to this present day, efforts have been made to preserve the poetic tradition and not let it be forgotten. Although writing nabati poems allowed the preservation of many pieces in the long-term, this innovation is new to nabati as a form and was not practiced by the original Bedouin poets who transmitted their work orally. Gatherings were where nabati poetry recitations took place. Arabs would all gather around, drink their coffee, and share their poems. Different tribes would specifically write, recite, and memorize pieces that were honoring their lineage. There were many techniques poets used to recite their poems, such as creating dramatic pauses in between lines or repeating words or lines to emphasize the meaning. Audiences would also use an “echoing” technique where they shout out the lines or words after the reciter for dramatic effect. Many of these techniques are still used today by nabati poets and audiences; many of these drive the tradition and help protect it.

The Nabati community has adapted its poetic tradition to contemporary media platforms, including radio and television, thereby expanding its audience reach beyond the Gulf region. These technological integrations have enabled poets to increase output, preserve cultural relevance, and popularize the art form internationally.

== Etymology ==
The term nabati is considered to have been derived from the Nabataean civilization, an Arab kingdom that arose in north-western Arabia and had its cultural center in the city of Petra.

== In the United Arab Emirates ==
Among the first Emirati poets to gain importance during the twentieth century were Mubarak Al Oqaili (1880–1954), Salem bin Ali Al Owais (1887–1959) and Ahmed bin Sulayem (c. 1905–1976). Three other poets of importance in the UAE were Khalfan Musabah (1923–1946), Sheikh Saqr Al Qasimi (1925–1993), a former ruler of Sharjah, and Sultan bin Ali Al Owais (1925–2000). The three poets, known as the Heera group, grew up in the village of Al Heera in Sharjah and were close friends. In addition to these pioneers of nabati poetry, many other prominent figures have emerged over the years, leaving an everlasting fingerprint on both classical and Nabati poetry as they are known today. Among these figures is Sheikh Mohammed bin Rashid Al Maktoum (b. 1946), ruler of Dubai, whose poems often depict themes of patriotism and leadership. His works, written in nabati form, were celebrated for the deep philosophical reflections and emotive language used in them. Another important figure is the late Sheikh Zayed bin Sultan Al Nahyan (1918-2004), the founding father of the UAE, who was not only known for his visionary leadership but also for his poems that echoed his love for his land, its people, and its unity. Mana Al Otaiba (b. 1946), another renowned Emirati poet, is also known for his immense contributions to nabati poetry. His verses explored a variety of themes including heritage and national pride, allowing readers across the Arab world to resonate with his works.

The UAE has promoted nabati poets and their works in many ways:

- Televised competitions: One of the largest nabati poetry competitions known as Million's Poet has been held biannually in the UAE since 2006 and is broadcast as a reality TV show.
- The Nabati Poetry Academy: The UAE's first nabati poetry academy was founded in 2008.
- Cultural Festivals and Events: The UAE often holds events such as the Abu Dhabi Poetry Festival, which feature Nabati poetry recitals.
- The Sheikh Zayed Book Award (Literature Category): The prestigious Sheikh Zayed Book Award, which honors literary excellence, includes a category for poetry. Nabati poetry is regularly highlighted in this category, providing recognition to poets who excel in this traditional art form.
- The Preservation of Documents: The UAE has taken extensive measures to document and archive nabati poetry, ensuring its preservation for future generations.
- Educational Initiatives: Both classical and nabati poetry have been integrated into the curriculum in schools and universities. These educational initiatives aim to instill appreciation for nabati poetry among younger generations.
