= SEKEM =

Egyptian organization

Coordinates: 30.4197°N 31.6341°E

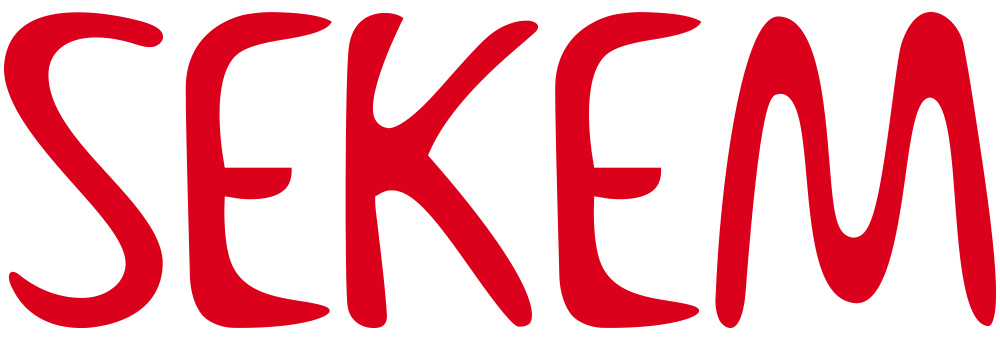
SEKEM-Logo

The organization SEKEM (Ancient Egyptian: 'vitality from the sun') was founded in 1977 by the Egyptian pharmacologist and social entrepreneur Dr. Ibrahim Abouleish in order to bring about cultural renewal in Egypt on a sustainable basis. Located northeast of Cairo, the organization now includes:

- biodynamic farms;
- trading companies for produce and processed foods (Hator and Libra), herbal teas and beauty products (ISIS Organic), medicinal herbs and medicines (ATOS Pharma), and organic cotton products (NatureTex);
- a medical center;
- a school based on the principles of Waldorf pedagogy open to pupils from any religious or ethnic background;
- a community school catering specifically to the needs of children from disadvantaged groups;
- a nursery
- a vocational training center;
- a college (Mahad Adult Education Training Institute) and research center (SEKEM Academy for Applied Art and Sciences);
- Heliopolis University for Sustainable Development

SEKEM's goals are to "restore and maintain the vitality of the soil and food as well as the biodiversity of nature" through sustainable, organic agriculture and to support social and cultural development in Egypt. Revenue from the trading companies grew from 37 million Egyptian pounds in 2000 to 100 million in 2003. By 2005, the organization had established a network of more than 2,000 farmers and numerous partner organizations in Egypt and began increasingly to seek to extend its "experience and acquired knowledge" to other countries, including India, Palestine, Senegal, Turkey, and - in partnership with the Fountain Foundation - South Africa.

== History ==
After a stay of 19 years in Austria, Dr. Abouleish returned to Egypt for a cultural trip in 1975. Touched by the deplorable economic and social situation of his country of origin, he decided to begin a project of cultural renewal on the basis of a synthesis of Islam and anthroposophy. Two years later he bought a plot of land in what was, at the time, desert bordering farmland of the Nile valley. The original goal was to develop the land and improve crop yields using biodynamic methods. A thick border of trees was planted to encircle the seventy hectares of land, and trees were planted along all the roads built; a forest was also planted on part of the land. (The initial planting included 120,000 casuarina, eucalyptus and Persian lilac seedlings.) The Bedouins who lived nearby, and sometimes on the land, were brought into the project, given work and helped with their living needs. Buildings were built using traditional adobe; some of these were designed by Hassan Fathy. The initial farm animals were Egyptian buffalo. The organization sold milk products produced from the buffalo milk and produce from the farm.

The first large economic venture of the community initiative was production of a medicinal compound, ammoidin, an extract of Ammi majus (laceflower). The manufacture of herbal teas and a company to market fresh biodynamic produce in Europe followed. The needs of these companies led to many farms throughout Egypt switching to biodynamic methods; the SEKEM organization began an active advisory service to aid these farms in the transition to and the maintenance of biodynamic standards. Sekem leased many of these lands.

Community projects began early in the initiative's history: a medical clinic using anthroposophic medicine, and a Society for Cultural Development sponsoring lectures, concerts and other cultural activities.

In 1987, the center for adult education (Mahad) began its work; children with handicaps are also educated in this center. In 1988, SEKEM opened a kindergarten also open to the local Bedouin community; this grew into the SEKEM school, educating children from kindergarten through twelfth grade (about 18 years of age) on the basis of Waldorf education. "The school serves Muslim and Christian children alike encouraging them to live in harmony and have respect for the other's religious practices." The school also operates a literacy center for illiterate children between ten and fourteen years of age.

In response to the use of child labor in Egypt, SEKEM founded the project Chamomile Children, which offers children between ten and fourteen an education, vocational training, meals, and medical care in conjunction with their work; the children's teachers look after the children the whole day. There is also a cooperative for employees to organize the social processes (the Cooperative of SEKEM Employees), an independent organization with members from all the businesses and cultural institutions associated with SEKEM.

In 1990, SEKEM founded the Centre of Organic Agriculture in Egypt (COAE), an independent organization that inspects organic farms in Egypt, Iran and Sudan.

Faced with pesticide residues in their products that came from aerial spraying on nearby farms, SEKEM took up an initiative to eliminate such spraying in Egypt. As cotton production depended upon the sprays, SEKEM explored organic cotton production on initially small fields. The experiments were successful and yields actually were better than non-organic production achieved. The Egyptian Ministry of Agriculture sponsored further and more extensive tests. Within three years, the ministry agreed that organic pest suppression was superior for cotton farming and began converting the entire area of Egyptian cotton, 4,000 square kilometres, to organic methods for controlling pests; the conversion took two years. The conversion resulted in a reduction in the use of synthetic pesticides in Egypt by over 90% and an increase in the average yield of raw cotton of almost 30%. SEKEM then created a company to process organic cotton using mechanical rather than chemical methods, NatureTex.

In response to increasing publicity about the novel methods employed by the community in many realms, the association of Muslim sheiks in Egypt gave the community a plaque verifying that SEKEM is an Islamic initiative. This was the result of intensive meetings between SEKEM and Muslim religious leaders.

SEKEM's next initiative was the first private pharmaceutical company in Egypt, specializing in medicinal teas. The medical center had now grown to the point where it needed its own building; concurrently it considerably expanded its outreach into the Bedouin community, helping establish sanitary facilities and clean water supplies.

In 1997, SEKEM established a vocational training center offering trainings in metalwork, carpentry, mechanical work, electrical work, tailoring, biodynamic farming and trading. The vocational center also includes an art school. The German Society for Technical Cooperation helped establish this project. In 1999 the SEKEM Academy (now Sekem University) opened. Originally a center for agricultural, pharmaceutical and medical research, the University now also conducts studies and offers training in other areas.

In 2001, a holding company was established to administer the finances of all the SEKEM companies and to oversee developmental projects. The holding company includes a department to help each individual company with its developmental process, and is also responsible for the education and training programs for employees.

== Social connections ==
All SEKEM companies have a policy of ensuring transparency in the production, distribution and consumption of their goods. They work to ensure fair and secure prices for the farmers supplying them, basing their operations on the principle that the health of the economy depends upon producers, distributors and consumers cooperating to generate stable businesses. SEKEM hosts a monthly gathering of all farmers working together with it; about 200 farmers attended these sessions as of 2004. It has created the following NGOs:

- A Cooperative of SEKEM Employees that works to ensure equality, equity and dignity for all employees. In particular, the cooperative supports employee training, career development and health care provisions. Ten percent of SEKEM employees' working time is available for professional and personal development through social and cultural enrichment activities.
- The SEKEM Developmental Foundation, with the goal of raising the quality of people's lives and supporting cultural and economic development in Egypt. The foundation provides education and literacy support for surrounding communities as well as programs for children with special needs. This includes a kindergarten, a "co-educational school with pupils from a diversity of cultural and social backgrounds, Muslim and Christian children learning together in a community where respect for all differences of gender, religion, class and ethnicity is cultivated", special education facilities and vocational trainings.
- An adult education center, MAHAD, that offers professional trainings as well as continuing education programs in a variety of areas.
- The Egyptian Biodynamic Association, established in 1990 as a research and training center in biodynamic methods. Approximately 800 farmers are now farming biodynamically in Egypt.

SEKEM and Dr. Ibrahim Abouleish received the Right Livelihood Award in 2003 for integrating the commercial success with promotion of the social and cultural development of society. The organization has been cited as a successful example of social entrepreneurship that has had a significant impact on Egyptian society both through its influence on the country's agricultural practices and through its educational and cultural institutions. Furthermore, Dr. Ibrahim Abouleish and his Son Helmy were named Social Entrepreneurs of the year 2003 by the Schwab Foundation for Social Entrepreneurship, and Well known business schools like IESE and CIDA City Campus use various case studies (e.g. Harvard Business Press to illustrate this novel approach to sustainable social entrepreneurship. Recent visitors included the first lady of Egypt, Suzanne Mubarak, a group from the Fulbright Commission in Egypt, the former Federal Minister of the Interior of Germany, Otto Schily and the founder of the Witten/Herdecke University Dr. Konrad Schily (a former member of the German Bundestag).

== See also ==
- Organic cotton

== Books and articles about SEKEM ==
- Abouleish, Ibrahim, SEKEM: A Sustainable Community in the Egyptian Desert, ISBN 0-86315-532-4
- "Respecting Human Nature" Al-Ahram Weekly
- "Mephisto in Elysium" Al-Ahram Weekly
- "Ibrahim Abouleish: Vision of Vitality, Engineering a Social Renaissance" Al-Ahram Weekly
- Visscher, Marcus, "Miracle in the desert", Ode, November 2004
- Plans for SEKEM University
- Mair, Johanna; Schoen, Oliver; "Successful social entrepreneurial business models in the context of developing economies: An explorative study", International Journal of Emerging Markets, Volume 2, Number 1, 2007, pp. 54–68(15).
- Mair, Johanna; Seelos, Christian; 2004 "The SEKEM Initiative" Case Study - Harvard Business School Publishing
- Elkington, John; Hartigan, Pamela; Power of Unreasonable People: How Social Entrepreneurs Create Markets that Change the World HBS Press Book, 2008
- El Ahl, Amira. "Wie kommt die Eurythmie in die Wüste?". Spiegel (in German).
- UN Global Compact: SEKEM Corporate Responsibility
