= Prince of Poets =

Television series

Prince of Poets is a reality television poetry competition on the Emirati television network Abu Dhabi TV. It was created in April 2007 by the Abu Dhabi Authority for Culture and Heritage, and airs live from the Al Raha Beach theatre every week. The winner is awarded one million dirhams and a symbolic cloak and ring. Reflecting the pre-eminence of poetry in the Arab world, the programme's ratings overtook those of football and of other reality television programmes, with a studio audience of thousands and a television audience of millions. Its title comes from the epithet of Arabic-language epic poet Ahmed Shawqi.

Thousands of aspiring poets from all over the Arab world submit their poems, and several dozen are chosen to compete. In the competition, contestants read their poems, and are also asked to improvise poems on various subjects. A jury of established poets and critics judges and offers feedback on the entries, while the studio audience and viewers at home can also vote for their preferred poets. Despite the show's title, the contestants can be male or female. Prince of Poets Xtra, the programme's interview segment, airs after each episode.

Prince of Poets is similar to another Emirati poetry competition, Million's Poet; the latter promotes Nabati (Bedouin) poetry, while the former promotes classical Arabic poetry and is an attempt to revive it in modern society. Like Million's Poet, it has been compared to American Idol.

== Notable contestants ==
Egyptian poet Hisham al Gakh was an audience favorite in the competition's fourth season after presenting a controversial poem, "The Visa," which criticized Arab leaders. He later missed an episode in order to participate in political protests in his home country, then wrote a poem about the revolution called "Tahrir Square." Favored to win the competition after reaching the finals through an audience vote, he came in second after Yemeni poet Abdul Aziz al Zera'i. His final poem, "The Last Message," also dealt with the democratic revolution.

Palestinian poet Tamim al-Barghouti competed in the first season. Although he finished the competition in fifth place, he became very popular among Palestinians, with media outlets of rival political parties Fatah and Hamas both urging followers to vote for him by text message. He was also popular in the broader Arab world, with excerpts from his poem reportedly being made into ringtones.

Other winners have been Syrian Hassan Baiti (third season), Mauritanian Sidi Mohamed Ould Bamba (second season), and Emirati Abdul Kareem Maatouk (first season).

=== Other individuals ===
The programme's presenters have included Dhafer L'Abidine, in the first series, and Eyad Nassar, in the second series, and Mahira Abdel Aziz presented the ninth. Xtra is presented by Raja el Shehi.

Musicians and established poets who have performed on the programme include Iman Bakri, Amal Maher, Majid Al Muhandis, Naseer Shamma, and Walid Toufic.
