= Million's Poet =

UAE reality television show

- Country of origin: United Arab Emirates

Production
- Production location: Abu Dhabi

Original release
- Network: TVE; 1993–2006; Abu Dhabi TV; 2006–present
- Release: 2007 – present

Million's Poet (Arabic: شاعر المليون) is a reality television show in the United Arab Emirates, which was first broadcast in December 2006. The show is a Nabati vernacular poetry competition in which the participants compose and recite poems.

== History ==
The show is funded by the Abu Dhabi Authority for Culture & Heritage and is inspired by a pre-Islamic poetry festival at Souk Okaz. 48 participants are selected from among several thousand applicants. In each episode, participants read a poem they have written. A panel of judges evaluate the style and language of the poems and the quality of the recitation; contestants also receive votes from the audience, and are eliminated from the competition until five finalists remain.

The show's prize initially amounted to one million UAE dirham, in addition to a banner made of the most expensive fabric in the world, featuring the program's logo. The winner will keep the banner for a full year, allowing them to defend their title the following year. Starting with the second season, the prize was raised to five million dirhams. The competition is overseen by the Abu Dhabi Authority for Culture & Heritage, and is implemented and produced by Pyramedia, headed by Egyptian media personality Nashwa Al-Ruwaini, the company's CEO.

In 2010, journalist and editor Hissa Hilal was the show's first female finalist, finishing third in the finals. Her poems strongly criticized "ad hoc fatwas", religious extremism and conservative clerics.

== Eligibility requirements ==
Five basic eligibility requirements must be met for the program:

1. Applicants must be between 18 and 45 years old.
2. A Nabati poem must be written in rhyme and meter, not exceeding 20 verses, and not less than 10 verses.
3. The poem must be printed; handwritten poems are not accepted.
4. Applicants must also submit a high-quality personal photo, along with a copy of a passport valid for at least 12 months.

== See also ==
- Prince of Poets
