= Mahdi Amel =

Lebanese poet and activist (1936–1987)

Mahdi 'Amel
- Born: Hassan Abdullah Hamdan; 1936; Harouf, Lebanon
- Died: 18 May 1987 (aged 50–51); Beirut, Lebanon
- Cause of death: Assassinated
- Other name: Hilal Bin Zaytoun

Education
- Education: University of Lyon

Philosophical work
- Era: 20th-century philosophy
- Region: Middle Eastern philosophy
- Institutions: Lebanese University
- Main interests: Philosophy, Education, Marxism, Colonialism
- Notable works: Marx in Edward Said's Orientalism

Hassan Abdullah Hamdan (Arabic: حسن عبد الله حمدان, romanized: Ḥassan ʿAbd Allāh Ḥamdān), more commonly known by his pseudonym Mahdi Amel (Arabic: مهدي عامل, romanized: Mahdī ʿĀmil), (Harouf, Lebanon 1936 – Beirut, Lebanon 18 May 1987) was a Lebanese Marxist philosopher, historian and militant in the second half of the 20th century.

Amel was a professor of philosophy at the Lebanese University in Beirut, and a prominent member of both the Lebanese Communist Party and the Union of Lebanese Writers. He also contributed to the magazine al-Tariq, the mouthpiece of the Lebanese Communist Party.

'Amel was assassinated at the age of 51, amidst the violence and chaos of the Lebanese civil war.

== Early life ==
Mahdi was born to a Shia Muslim family in 1936 in Harouf, close to the southern Lebanese city of Nabatieh. His parents moved him and his siblings to Beirut shortly afterwards. In Beirut, Mahdi attended high school at the al-Maqasid School. In 1956, Mahdi began his university studies in France, eventually receiving a PhD in Philosophy from the University of Lyon. Afterwards, Mahdi began his active involvement with the Lebanese Communist Party, joining in 1960.

== Algeria ==
In 1963, Mahdi moved to the newly independent Algeria with his wife, Evelyne Brun.

== Return to Lebanon and the Communist Party ==
Upon returning to Lebanon in 1968, Mahdi began work as a teacher at a high school for girls. Later on, he changed jobs to become a full-time professor at the Institute of Social Sciences at the Lebanese University. There, he taught philosophy, politics, and methodologies.

At this time, Mahdi began contributing to al-Tariq, the mouthpiece of the Lebanese Communist Party. For the articles he wrote for this magazine, Mahdi began using the pseudonym by which he is now most commonly known (Mahdi 'Amel).

Mahdi traveled widely within Lebanon to deliver lectures on Marxism and to discuss pressing issues with farmers around the country.

Mahdi moved up the ranks of the Lebanese Communist Party, eventually becoming a member of the Central Committee in the Fifth Convention, which took place in 1987.

== Personal life ==
Mahdi Amel was married to Evelyne Brun. He had three children, Karim, Yasmine and Rida.

He was a Shia Muslim.

== Death ==
Mahdi 'Amel was assassinated on May 18, 1987, by Islamic sectarian forces at the age of 51. Amel was walking on Algeria street when two men called his name. As he turned around, the men shot him. He died later that day at the American University of Beirut's hospital.

== Works ==
In 1991, a collection of his work from the period between 1968 and 1973 was published as In Issues of Teaching and Educational Policies. In this collection, Mahdi describes how Lebanon's education system reproduces sectarianism and undermines overall education.

=== Notable works ===
Among Mahdi's notable scholarly work, his criticism of Edward Said's Orientalism on account of its misreading of Marx's work has gained considerable respect.

- Theoretical Introductions to Study the influence of Socialism on the National Liberation Movement.
- Conflict of Arab Civilization or Conflict of Arab bourgeoisie?
- Theory in Political Practice: Research in the Causes of the Lebanese Civil War.
- Introduction to Critique of Sectarianism: The Palestinian Cause in the Ideology of the Lebanese Bourgeoisie.
- Marx in Edward Said's Orientalism: Intelligence for the West and Passion for the East?
- In the Scientific Nature of Ibn Khaldun's School of Thought.
- Introduction to the Critique of Sectarianism in the Sectarian State.
- Arab Marxism and National Liberation: Selected Writings.

=== Poetry ===
On top of political activism and articles on Marxism, Mahdi also authored poems, which he signed under the name Hilal Bin Zaytoun.

- Time Improvisations
- The Space of N

== See also ==
- Husayn Muruwwa
- Edward Said
- Marxism
- Lebanese Civil War
