= Zelimkhan Yaqub =

Azerbaijani poet and politician

Zelimkhan Yagubov
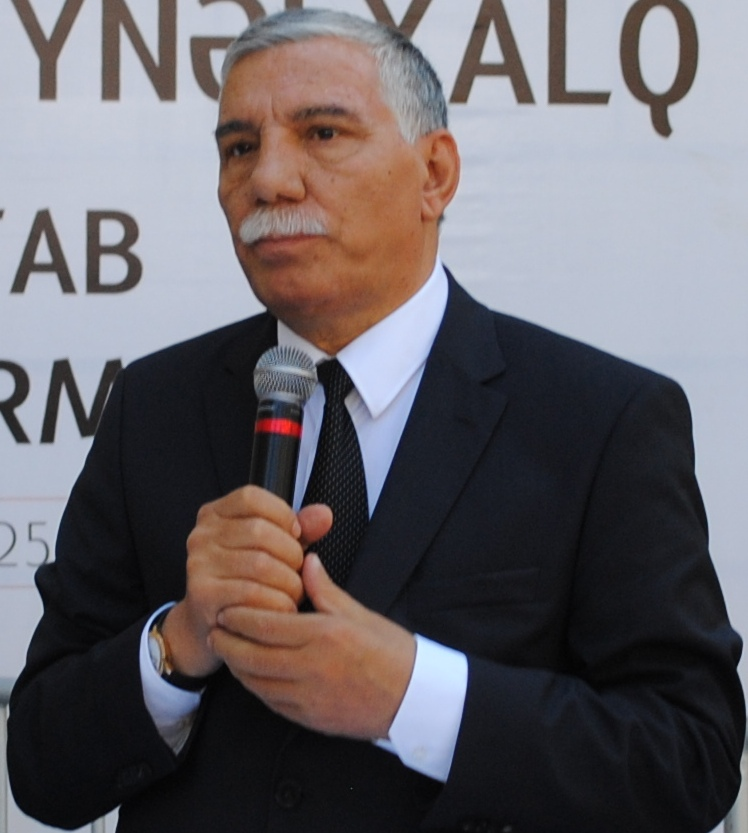

Deputy of the Milli Majlis of the Republic of Azerbaijan of the II convocation
- In office 2000–2005

Personal details
- Born: Zəlimxan Yusif oğlu Yaqubov; 21 January 1950
- Died: 9 January 2016
- Party: New Azerbaijan Party
- Education: Baku State University

Zelimkhan Yaqub (Azerbaijani: Zəlimxan Yaqub; 21 January 1950 – 9 January 2016) was an Azerbaijani Turkish poet and also politician. He served as deputy of the National Assembly of Azerbaijan from 1995 to 2005. He was also named the national poet of Azerbaijan in 2005.

== Life ==
Zelimkhan Yaqub was born on 21 January 1950, in Bolnisi Municipality, Georgian SSR, Soviet Union.

He graduated from high school in the village where he was born in 1967, and in 1972 from the library faculty of the Azerbaijan State University.

From 1973 to 1978 in the "Azerkitab" system, in the bookstore "Book Passage" salesman, chief salesman, and department head, from 1975 to 1985 editor, department head in the propaganda department of the Azerbaijan Voluntary Book Lovers Society, from 1987 to 1994 he worked as an editor and head of the poetry department at the Yazichi publishing house.

In 1995–2005 he was a deputy of the Milli Majlis of the Republic of Azerbaijan.

His first poem was published on 4 October 1966, in the "Flag of Victory" newspaper of the Bolnisi district of the Georgian SSR.

He had been a member of the Union of Azerbaijani Writers since 1983.

On 29 August 2008, at the V Congress of Azerbaijani Ashugs, he was elected chairman of the Azerbaijan Ashugs Union.

He had been a member of the Pardon Commission under the President of the Republic of Azerbaijan since 1994.

From 1995 to 2000, he visited China, Saudi Arabia, Germany, the United States, Sweden, Switzerland, Kyrgyzstan, Turkey, France and Iraq as part of the official delegation.

Zalimkhan Yagub has been suffering from kidney failure for a long time. He underwent treatment in countries such as Turkey and Germany. The public figure, in the last years of his life, who did not have both kidneys, lived on dialysis. He died on 9 January 2016.

== Awards ==
Mammad Araz Literary Prize (1995), H.Z. Tagiyev Prize for the book "Poet's Call", "Wounds of the Motherland", "I do not condemn you" and "Let your visit be accepted" (1995), the Shohrat Order and the Order of Honor of the Republic of Georgia was awarded.

In 2005, he was awarded the honorary title of "People's Poet of Azerbaijan".

On 5 October 2012, the New York Association of Azerbaijan, which operates in the United States, awarded the People's Poet with an Honorary Diploma and a Medal.

People's Poet of Azerbaijan Zalimkhan Yagub was awarded the International Nazim Hikmet Poetry Award for his outstanding services to Turkish literature by the decision of the International Award Committee of the International Academy of Turkic World Studies in Ankara on 7 February 2014. Zalimkhan Yagub is the first Azerbaijani to receive this award, which is awarded every two years to one of the writers of the Turkic world.

== Honorary membership ==
On 6 June 2009, he was awarded the "Service to the Turkic World" award of the International Academy of Turkic World Studies and was elected an honorary doctor of the academy.

In 2010, Zalimkhan Yagub was awarded the title of Honorary Doctor of the Georgian-Azerbaijani University of Education named after Heydar Aliyev for his special services in the poetic coverage of the Georgian-Azerbaijani friendship.

== Books written about ==
Poet-publicist Ali Rza Khalafli wrote a book "Song of Immortality" ("Vatan" publishing house, 2013) about the poem "Epic of Eternity" dedicated to Zalimkhan Yagub to prominent statesman Heydar Aliyev and published it in an elegant design.

In 2016, the book "Eternal Prometheus" by People's Poet Khalil Rza Uluturk was published. The book was prepared for publication by Honored Cultural Worker Musa Nabioglu and was published by the "Science and Education" publishing house. In the book, Zalimkhan Yagub is called "Eternal Prometheus, Eternal Samander Bird", who considers him "the head of our poetry, poetry, the Azerbaijani people", and 30 years ago "Zalimkhan is the only poet who does not need any propaganda in Azerbaijan," said KhRuluturk. Zalimkhan Yagub's articles dedicated to his work and notes about him in his diary were collected.

== Books ==
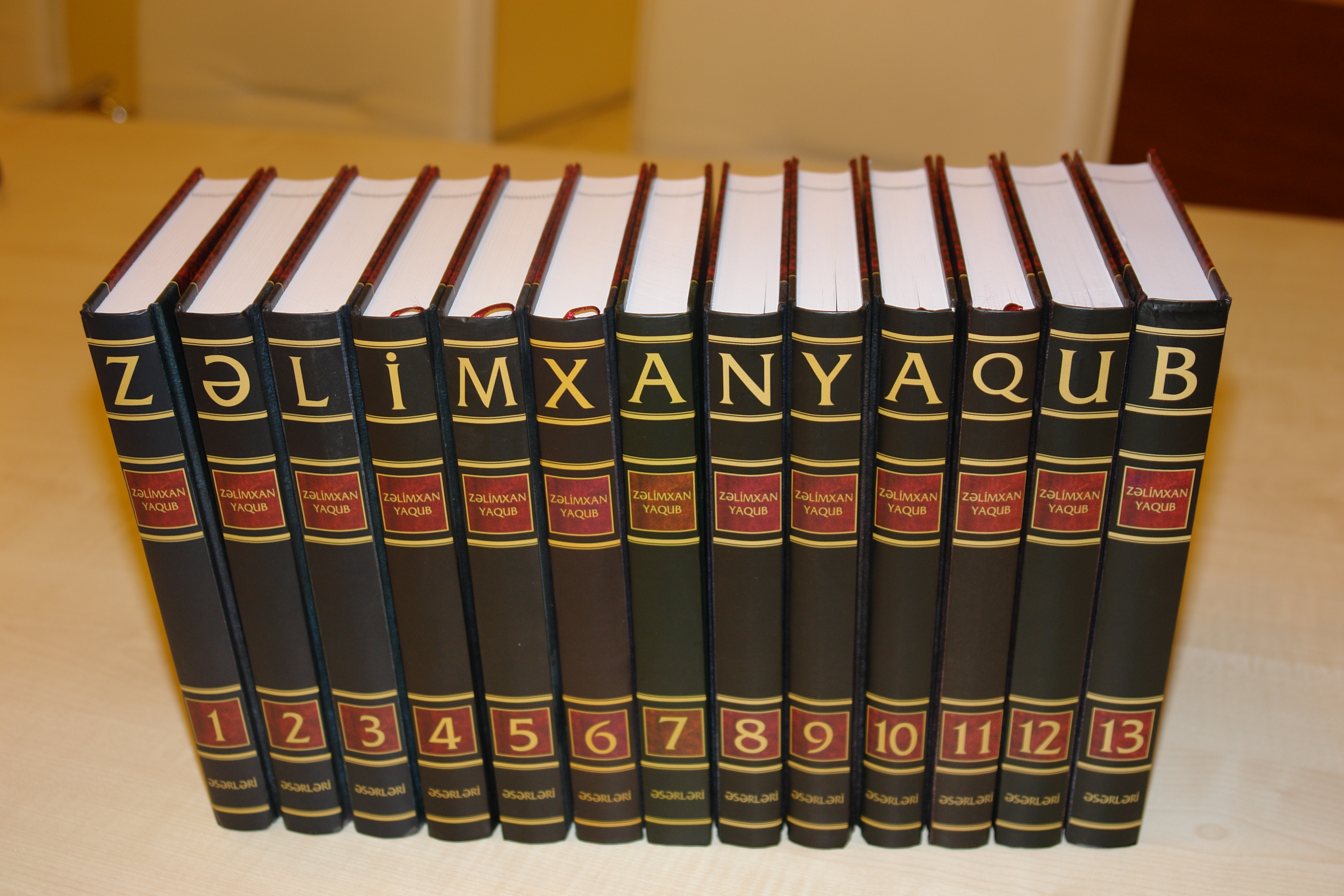
Selected works of Zalimkhan Yagub in 13 volumes

- Şair harayı
- Vətən yaralar
- Sizi qınamıram
- Ziyarətin qəbul olsun
- Od aldığım ocaqlar 1986
- Mən sənin qəlbinə necə yol tapım 2003
- Böyük ömrün dastanı 2004
- Qayıdaq əvvəlki xatirələrə 2004
- Gözlərimin nurudu doğulduğum bu torpaq 2005
- Mən bir dağ çayıyam 2006
- Əbədiyyət dastanı 2008
- Сказы саза 2008
- Peyğəmbər (poema) 2009
- Özün basdırdığın ağaca söykən (I cild). Bakı. "Şərq-Qərb", 2010, 284 səh. şəkilli
- Özün basdırdığın ağaca söykən (II cild). Bakı. "Şərq-Qərb", 2010,
- Mövlana. Bakı: "Vətən", 2012. — 194 səh.
- Seçilmiş əsərləri,
- Məni sabahıma qovuşdur, ana. Bakı. "Elm və təhsil", 2015,
- Seçilmiş əsərləri. 2020 ("Xalq əmanəti" layihəsi çərçivəsində)
