= Elias Abu Shabaki =

Lebanese writer

- Elias Abu Shabaki
- Born: Elias Youssef Abu Shabaki; May 3, 1903; Providence, Rhode Island, US
- Died: January 27, 1947 (aged 43); Beirut, Lebanon
- Occupations: Poet; short-story writer; editor; literary critic
- Spouse: Olga Saroufim
- Writing career
- Pen name: Rassam, Asabsab, Abu Nassif, Al-Shater Hassan
- Genre: Romantic poetry
- Literary movement: An-Nahda, Comparative literature, Romanticism

Elias Abu Shabaki (also spelled Ilyas Abu Shabaka; Arabic: الياس أبو شبكة, May 3, 1903 – January 27, 1947) was a Lebanese writer, poet, editor, translator, and literary critic. He was one of the founders of the literary League of Ten and is considered a leading figure of the Arabic Nahda Movement. Born into a well-to-do Lebanese family, Abu Shabaki developed an interest in poetry at a young age. The son of a merchant, he was orphaned early in life, a loss that deeply influenced his early work. Abu Shabaki worked as a teacher and translator, and in addition to publishing several volumes of poetry, he wrote as a journalist for numerous Arabic newspapers and literary magazines.

An adherent of the Romantic school, he valued inspiration and rejected conscious control in poetry. His poems are often gloomy and deeply personal, frequently featuring biblical themes centered on his internal moral conflicts. Some of his work was highly controversial at the time, particularly his poetry collection Serpents of Paradise, which was considered obscene due to its explicit sexual content. His recurring focus on the spiritual consequences of carnality reflected a guilt attributed to his extramarital affairs during his marriage, continuing until his death from leukemia in 1947. Abu Shabaki advocated for the renewal and modernization of Arab literature and inspired successive generations of poets. His literary legacy is honored by the transformation of his house in his hometown of Zouk Mikael into a museum.

== Biography ==
=== Childhood and youth ===
Elias Abu Shabaki was born on 3 May 1903 in Providence, USA to Youssef Abu Shabaki, a wealthy Lebanese merchant, and his wife, Nayla (née Saroufim). Elias' mother came from a family well known for its poetic gifts, and both Nayla's brother and maternal uncle (Elias Ferzan) were established poets. The couple had left the Lebanon to visit Nayla's uncle, Elias Ferzan in Providence where she gave birth to Elias at Ferzan's place. In 1904, Youssef and Nayla settled back in their native town of Zouk Mikael in the current Keserwan District in Mount Lebanon, a town overlooking the Mediterranean Sea which is noted for its natural beauty. Elias was raised as a devout Christian by his Maronite parents; he was admitted in 1911 to the Lazarist Saint Joseph College in the nearby town of Aintoura where he studied, among other courses, French and Arabic literature. Nayla introduced Elias to Arabic poetry and taught him a long poem written by her uncle Elias Ferzan, which, according to the young Abu Shabaki, was highly inspirational.

In 1914, while Elias' father was visiting his estates in the Khartoum region in Sudan, he was attacked by bandits who stripped him of his belongings and killed him; the loss of his father left young Elias in a state of emotional distress and depression that would mark the rest of his life. The orphaned Elias continued his education at Aintoura until the outbreak of the Great War when he had to quit the school due to financial problems, though the school was later forced to close by the Ottoman authorities. Elias resumed his studies at the College Central in Jounieh which was run then by the Marist Brothers before returning a year later to Saint Joseph's, but he never graduated as a result of a quarrel he had with one of his teachers; nevertheless, he continued his self-education and read religious books and French Romantic literature extensively, which inspired his first literary efforts. Among the French authors, Elias was particularly fond of the works of Charles Baudelaire and Alfred de Musset.

=== Courtship and marriage ===
When he was 16, Elias met and was infatuated by his neighbor Olga Saroufim who was two years his senior. Their friendship rapidly evolved as they exchanged literary books and letters. Elias' attachment to Olga was most evident when she fell ill with fever during a visit to the southern city of Sour; Elias was reported to have invited his family members to kneel and pray for Olga to get better. After some 10 years of betrothal, Abu Shabaki wedded Olga in December 1931. Elias and Olga had a lone child together who died at birth in 1932.

=== Career ===
Having lost his father at an early age, Elias was compelled to teach to earn a living. He taught for a while at the Jesuit mission school then at the school of the Institute of the Brothers of the Christian Schools in Gemmayze, and lastly at the Makassed school. Elias had had an affinity for journalism since his youth, and he eked a meager living through his contributions to a number of Lebanese publications (Al Adib, Al Bayrak, Al Bayan, Al Nida, Al Ma'rad, Al 'assifa, Lisan al Hal, Al Joumhour, Al Makshouf and Sawt Al Ahrar), also publishing a significant number of journalistic articles on various topics. Elias also corresponded with a number of Egyptian newspapers such as Al Muqtataf and Al Masa. At the request of his publishers, Abu Shabaki translated into Arabic a number of French literary materials from the 17th to the 19th century, such as Lamartine's Jocelyn and La Chute d'un ange, Edmond Rostand's La Samaritaine, Bernardin St. Pierre's Paul et Virginie and La Chaumière Indienne, and many other works by Henry Bordeaux, Voltaire, Antoine François Prévost, and Moliere. Elias was employed during World War II as a translator in the press and radio services of the French high Commission.

In 1926 Elias produced his first poetic juvenilia al-Kithara (The lyre); the work attests of the young poet's inexperience but also of his promising talent. In 1928 Elias finished al-Marid as-samit (The silent invalid), a narrative poem which is one of Abu Shabaki's best known works, springing from the center of European romantic tradition. His next book Afa'i al-Firdaws (Serpents of Paradise), published in 1938, is lauded by many as Abu Shabaki's best work and one of the best accomplishments of romantic poetry in modern Lebanese and Arabic literature. Afa'i al Firdaws and Elias' latter works would play an influential role in the development of modern Arabic poetry and literature. In 1941 Elias published his third book al-Alhan (The melodies), an ode to simple peasant life, followed in 1944 by Nidaa' al-Qalb (The heart's evocation) and Ila al-Abad (Eternally), where Elias reverts to discussing matters of the heart from a more mature perspective. Ghalwaa was published in 1945. The book's title is an anagram of Olga's name in Arabic.

In addition to poetry, Elias published a number of studies, including a study in comparative literature called Rawabith al-fikr wal-ruh bayn al-Arab wal-Franja (Intellectual and spiritual links between the Arabs and the French), in which he sought to demonstrate the weight of French influence on world literature; he also authored long essays about Lamartine, Baudelaire and Oscar Wilde. In addition, Abu Shabaki produced a series of portraits of literary and political personages, which were first published in al-Maarad journal and then collected in a volume dubbed al-Rusum (The Portraits).

=== Death ===
Elias died on January 27, 1947, from Leukemia at the Hôtel-Dieu de France Hospital in Beirut, he was buried in his hometown of Zouk Mikael. After his death, Elias' friends put together a number of verses and works that were published in periodicals in a book dubbed Min Sa'id al-Aliha (From the bosom of the Gods) in 1958.

== Views and beliefs ==
=== Morality ===
Elias was raised a devout Christian by his Maronite parents in the Lebanese countryside. His religious schooling and upbringing is reflected in his deeply spiritual writings and his resort to the Bible for some of his poems, which reflects the strong hold it had upon him. Elias developed a consuming obsession with the opposing forces of good and evil, awakened at an early age due to the loss of his father at the beginning of World War I; early writings attest to the young poet's disgust and disenchantment with human existence. This is best manifested in a poem entitled Qathoora (Defilement).

Abu Shabaki's stances and the subjects he treated were considered provocative and scandalous at the time. He forthrightly and fearlessly confronted matters of sin, sexuality and immorality in a deeply personal manner. Even though he was one of the first Arab literary figures to bluntly address these taboo issues, Abu Shabaki drew praise for his innovative style. During his lengthy engagement to Olga, Elias had a torrid love affair with a married woman that is subliminally confessed in his writing of Ghalwa and Serpents of Paradise, where the remorseful Elias engages in constant conflict between lust and love and the struggle to reconcile sensual bestiality with spirituality. Despite Abu Shabaki's celebration of carnal pleasures, he retained his belief in God, whose judgment he feared; his poems show a concern for the spiritual expenses that these pleasures entail.

=== Women and sexuality ===
Some scholars (Note: Robin Ostle in Between Heaven and Hell: Sin and Sexuality in the Poetry of Ilyas Abu Shabaka (1903–1947), Representations of the Divine in Arabic Poetry. Gert Borg and Ed de Moor (Eds.).Orientations 5, Editions Rodopi, Amsterdam-Atlanta, 2001, pp183-193) argue that Elias was a misogynist as attested at an early stage in his works, such as this passage from al-Kithara:

"Beware of love! Love is evil; it is a fire in the heart that melts.If there is a deceitful heart in men, then the hearts of women are more so." (Note: Al-Kithara, (Beirut 1926) p.35.)

Elias epitomized beautiful lewd women as diabolical creatures, cunning temptresses causing man's downfall and "Serpents of Paradise"; this bitter and ironical antithesis is an allusion to danger and evil that is brought upon by lust and sin. Elias' aversion and attraction to women and sex is evident in the poem "Storm" where the disturbed poet condemns a prostitute while asking her to make love; similarly in "The Wretched Woman", Abu Shabaki depicts a prostitute who inflicts her clients with venereal diseases as a way to avenge herself. Elias' attitude towards women softened and changed radically as attest his later works as he went through a process of reconciliation and redemption through love.

Despite his views, Elias was romantically involved with at least four women, according to his biographer Razzuk Faraj Razzuk. Olga Saroufim, whom Abu Shabaki married in 1931, was the main love of his life, yet he had an affair with Rose, a married woman in his hometown, while he was engaged to marry in 1929. Elias alludes to this experience in many of his writings, especially his book "Serpents of Paradise". The third woman to mark Abu Shabaki's life, albeit in a minor role, was an Egyptian singer called Hadia who exercised a calming effect on Abu Shabaki, as evidenced by the poem written for her. After having parted with the singer, in 1940 Elias met a dancer called Leila Adem; the poems in "The Call of the Heart" and "To Eternity" were written for her. Abu Shabaki's relationship with Leila continued until his death in 1947.

== Writing ==
Abu Shabaki was a prolific writer, publishing a wide variety of works, including poems, journal articles, and literary studies. Widely seen as his most important work was Afa'i al-Firdaws (1938). Elias' writing is characterized by powerful imagery, realism, and often a striking carnality and obsession with the pleasures of the flesh. Elias believed that the purest art evolves from emotion, which he thought was the source of authentic and aesthetic experience; he set a high value for inspiration and denounced rationalism and the role of conscious control in writing poetry. In one poem, Abu Shabaki wrote that truthful poetry is the best, contrary to the old Arabic saying that the best poetry is that which feigns most.

=== Influences ===
The many hardships and emotional challenges that Abu Shabaki endured, from growing up fatherless amid the First World War to losing his only born son, influenced his gloomy poetry which conveys a strong sense of the presence of evil in the world and an effort to find an escape in love or in the innocence of childhood and nature. Elias' often pessimistic writings evoked a concern for the body and its lust, greatly affected by Romantic works he had read during his youth which commended loneliness, sorrow, passion, pain and death and denounced the materialism and lewdness of city life. Christian tradition and imagery inspired and permeated much of Abu Shabaki's work, which abounds in biblical images, mirroring the experiences of a Christian who felt deeply about the teachings of the Catholic Church.

=== League of ten ===
In 1930, Abu Shabaki, along with Michel Abou Shahla, Khalil Takieddin and Fouad Hobeish, co-founded a literary society conveniently dubbed the "League of Ten" (Arabic: عصبة العشرة) since it at first included ten literary and artistic figures. In addition to the four founding members, the league consisted of Karam Ali Melhem Karam, Youssef Ibrahim Yazbek, Takieddin al-Solh, Toufic Youssef Awwad, Abdallah Lahoud, and Michel Asmar. The league waged an assiduous attack on literary figures and the political establishment through articles published in the periodical al-Maarad, which was subsequently forced to close by the government. The league's aim was to promote literary renewal and modernization of Arab literature. (Note: Al-Rusum, (Beirut 1929))

=== Publications ===
==== Al-Kithara ====
Elias' first Diwan, al-Kithara (The Lyre), was published in 1926 by Sader publishers. Al-Kithara was Elias' earliest work, attesting of the young poet's inexperience while revealing his great poetic potential. The juvenilia that showed the influence of classical Arab poets such as Abu Nuwas was described as gloomy and pretentious. It contained a number of poems translated from French and was dedicated to the spirit of Abu Shabaki's dead father; the dedication established the melancholy and pessimistic mood that pervades the Diwan.

==== Al-Marid as-samet ====
Al-Marid as-samet (The Silent Invalid) was Elias' second juvenilia. It was published in 1928 and was the poet's first trial at narrative poetry.

==== Ghalwaa ====
Abu Shabaka's narrative poem Ghalwaa was written between the years 1926 and 1932 but wasn't published until 1945 by Sader Press, two years before the poet's death. The poem was inspired by Elias' love interest and muse, Olga; the poem's title is an anagram of Olga's name in Arabic (أولغا=غلواء). It was viewed ever since its publication as an influential and progressive work that revolutionized Arabic literature and as a prime example of Arabic romanticism. The generally acclaimed masterpiece owed its success to its sheer artistic merit, impressive length, and the juxtaposition of extreme emotional and moral situations such as passion and sin. Although Mahjarite writers had produced similar long poems, they seldom engaged in poems with such clear narrative plot.

==== Afa'i al-Firdaws ====
Afa'i al-Firdaws (Serpents of Paradise) is a collection of 13 poems written between 1928 and 1938 and published in 1938 by the now-defunct Dar al-Makshouf publishing press. The book is highly regarded as a masterpiece of Lebanese poetry; it draws inspiration from love and eroticism in a clear connection to the influences of French romantic works such as Charles Baudelaire's Les fleurs du mal. In Serpents of Paradise, Elias' candid and puritanical morality gives way to a sense of sin and spiritual deprivation as he comes to terms with the effects of the love affair that he had while he was betrothed to Olga. The Diwan is characterized by constant antithesis between love and deceit life and death.

==== Al-Alhan ====
Al-Alhan (The Melodies) is an anthology encompassing 16 poems. Al-Alhan was published in 1941 by Dar al-Makshouf. It was described as a unique work in the history of Arabic literature; each of the poems deals with a different aspect of rustic life, where images of Lebanese folklore and colloquialism abound. In the book, Abu Shabaki identifies himself with the peasant, praises the simplicity of traditional ways, and furthers himself from the spurious gifts of technology and displays of false riches. Eliyah Hawi, a contemporary literary figure, saw Abu Shabaki's poem as calling to a form of new paganism where Abu Shabaki "worships the blessing and fertility of the Earth womb." Through al-Alhan, Abu Shabaki paved the way for a new trend among his contemporary Muslim poets, which manifested in a return to Islamic Sufism or to pre-Islamic natural atheism, such as in the case of Adunis.

==== Nidaa al-Qalb and Ila al-Abad ====
Published in 1942 by Dar al-Makshouf, Nidaa al-Qalb (The Call of the Heart) is a collection of love poems. In this volume, Elias placed aside his view of woman as an evil snare and extolled chaste love, in a striking contrast with the harsh judgment and hedonistic pursuits expressed in Afai al-firdaws. In the poem The Cup, Abu Shabaki, having recovered peace and his faith in love, accepts his predicament as a poet who is unappreciated by his society.

Ila al-Abad (To Eternity) was the last of Abu Shabaki's works published during his lifetime; the anthology confirmed Elias' return to peace that was evidenced in The Call of the Heart. The crude sensuality of his earlier works are totally replaced with more refined and mystical dimensions of love that are further emphasized in this book, which was also issued by Dar al-Makshouf in 1944.

== Legacy ==
Elias is considered a cornerstone in modern Arabic poetry in Lebanon and one of the greatest Arab poets; he is also one of the leading Lebanese figures of Arabic romanticism. His revival of the romantic school, long dormant in the Occident, was pursued by a large following of Arab contemporary poets and writers. The romantic movement is now outdated in the Middle East but Abu Shabaka's work still attracts young readers who appreciate sentimentality and poetry and have little taste for the socio-political raptness found in the work of modern, politically engaged Arab poets. Abou Shabaki's work confirmed the Christian tradition in modern Arabic literature and helped establish the Bible as a literary source in Arabic. Later writers and poets benefited from the revival of biblical themes and legends that Abu Shabaki's poetry portrayed. The poet influenced the writings of many of his successors like Badr Shakir al-Sayyab, Nizar Qabbani, Khalil Hawi, Henry Zgheib and Adunis.

=== Elias Abu Shabaki Museum ===
On 11 June 2008, the Zouk Mikael municipality inaugurated the Elias Abu Shabaki museum in the poet's home. Abu Shabaki's mansion in Zouk Mikael was built by his father and uncle, who traded goods between Egypt, Sudan, and Lebanon. The mansion was designed by an Egyptian architect, built by local stonemasons, and its interior walls were decorated by Austrian artists. In the later years of his life, Elias had mortgaged his house due to his poor financial condition. The municipality appropriated the plot in the 1970s and saved the house and its gardens from being replaced by a residential building. The mansion was restored during the next 2 decades and was refurbished with the original furniture and accessories of the poet that were saved by his wife's family; in addition to the furniture, the museum houses a collection of the poet's books, original manuscripts, and letters.
