= Al Adab =

Literary magazine in Lebanon (1953–2012)

- Former editors: Suhayl Idris; Samah Idris
- Categories: Literary magazine
- Frequency: Monthly; Five times annual; Four times annual
- Founder: Suhayl Idris; Mahij Uthman; Munir Al Baalbecki
- Founded: 1953
- First issue: January 1953
- Final issue: Autumn 2012 (print)
- Country: Lebanon
- Based in: Beirut
- Language: Arabic
- Website: Al Adab
- ISSN: 0258-3925
- OCLC: 230709971

Al Adab (Arabic: مجلة الأداب, romanized: Majalla Al ʾĀdāb, lit. 'Literary magazine') was an Arabic avant-garde existentialist literary print magazine published in Beirut, Lebanon, in the period 1953–2012. It was restarted in 2015 as an online-only publication. Encyclopædia Britannica describes it as one of the leading publications founded in the Arab countries in the latter half of the 20th century. Although the magazine was headquartered in Beirut, it was distributed all over the Arabic-speaking regions.

== History and profile ==
Al Adab was launched by Suhayl Idris, Mahij Uthman and Munir Al Baalbecki in Beirut in 1953. The publisher was Dar Al Adab which was also established by Suhayl Idris who was the editor-in-chief of the magazine from 1956 to 1992. He was succeeded by his son Samah Idris who was a writer in both posts.

Al Adab was inspired from Les Temps modernes and has a pan-Arab political stance. The magazine was popular in all major intellectual centers of the Arab world such as Cairo and Baghdad. Its influence and popularity continued until the beginning of the civil war in Lebanon in 1975. The frequency of the magazine changed over time. It was started as a monthly and published on a monthly basis until 1980. Between 1980 and 2011 Al Adab appeared five times per year. The magazine was published four times in 2012 when it ceased its print version in Autumn 2012 after producing 60 volumes. Al Adab was relaunched as an online literary magazine in 2015.

The issues of Al Adab were archived by the American University of Beirut.

== Content and contributors ==
Al Adab was under the influence of Jean-Paul Sartre and existentialism adhering to the concept of commitment literature (al-adab al-multazim) which is also termed as the literary commitment (iltizam al-adab). The commitment of the magazine was the encouragement of literary outcomes focusing on the Arab world-related politics and social causes. Therefore, it argued that the literary work produced in Arabic should function as a medium for the liberation of Arabs, particularly of Palestinians and Algerians. The magazine was also a follower of the free verse approach in poetry.

Al Adab featured articles on politics, poetry, short stories, film criticism, theater, and culture with a special reference to the Arab world. It also frequently contained literary criticism. As an avant-garde publication Al Adab covered all forms of novice literary techniques which were applied to all literary genres. It published translations of the Vietnamese literary work.

The contributors of Al Adab were from different political origins, but all were the supporters of the approaches given above. Its notable contributors included Raif Khoury, Salama Moussa, Nazik Al Malaika and Taha Hussein. Abdel Rahman Badawi, an Egyptian poet, published articles on existentialism in the magazine. Iraqi authors also contributed to the magazine. Palestinian writer Tawfiq Sayigh published two articles on English literature in 1955. In the Spring 1968 issue of Al Adab the manifesto of Adunis, a Syrian poet, dated 5 June 1967 was published.

Although both were avant-garde publications and supported free verse movement, Al Adab was the main adversary of Shi'r, a poetry magazine started in Beirut in 1968. Because the latter was an ardent opponent of the commitment literature. Al Adab was also critical of the cultural elites of the period due to their inactiveness in regard to the achievement of the liberation of the Arab countries.
