= Thurayyā Malḥas =

Palestinian poet (1925–2013)

Thurayyā 'Abd al-Fattāḥ Malḥas (1925 – February 23, 2013; Arabic: ثريا ملحس) was a Palestinian poet and academic. She is considered a pioneer of free verse poetry among Palestinian women writers.

== Early life and education ==
Thurayyā Malḥas was born 1925 in Amman, in what was then the Emirate of Transjordan. She attended primary school in Amman, then moved to Jerusalem at age 15 and completed secondary school there. She spent time as a student at al-Ahliyya National School for Girls in Beirut, alongside fellow future creative figures such as Saloua Raouda Choucair, with whom she became close friends.

In 1945, Malḥas graduated from the American Junior College for Women, now Lebanese American University, with an associate's degree. She then studied Arabic and education at the American University of Beirut, graduating with a bachelor's degree in 1947 and a master's degree in 1951. Later in the 1950s, she traveled to the United Kingdom to continue her studies at SOAS University of London. She had returned to the American Junior College for Women, renamed as the Beirut College for Women, to teach in 1952, and eventually rose to head the Arabic department.

Then, in 1981, she earned a Ph.D. in Arabic philosophy from Saint Joseph University and became a professor at the university.

== Writing ==
Malḥas is considered the first Palestinian woman writer to produce free verse poetry, without relying on meter. This marked a shift in Palestinian women's literary output before the 1948 exodus, which had generally been characterized by highly traditional, flowery language. She was described by contemporary scholars as a "poetess of abstraction," and her prose poetry was characterized by lyrical and mystical elements, including "unfamiliar words and images." Sometimes described as modernist, Malḥas is also considered part of the first generation of modern women poets born in what was then Transjordan.

Beginning in the 1940s, she wrote for various local publications in Lebanon, predominantly as an art critic, including covering her former classmate Saloua Choucair's first public show in Beirut in 1952. In the mid-to-late 1940s, she began publishing poetry and prose in Al Adib magazine, and her signature style proved influential in the local literary scene.

Her first collection of prose poetry, al-Nashid al-Ta'ih ("The Wayward Hymn"), was published in 1949. She went on to publish a half-dozen other poetry collections between 1952 and 1968. She also published a book of poems in English, called Prisoners of Time. In 2001, her work was included in The Poetry of Arab Women: A Contemporary Anthology.

Though best known as a poet, she also wrote short stories, novels, and essays. Additionally, she produced various educational books and academic works, including Mikhail Naimy al-Adib al-Sufi, a study of the philosopher Mikhail Naimy, in 1964.

== Personal life and death ==
Malḥas was married to fellow academic Musa Sulaiman. She died in Amman in 2013 at age 88.
