= Albert Ollivier =

Albert Ollivier (1 May 1915 – 18 July 1964) was a French historian, author, journalist, politician and member of the French resistance. He was born and died in Paris.

== Biography ==
After studying law and literature, followed by political sciences, at Sorbonne, Albert Ollivier was hired as a publisher's reader at the Nouvelle Revue française and became Gaston Gallimard's secretary in 1937. He was mobilised into the French army in 1939. After the fall of France in June 1940, he worked as a journalist on Radio France under the Vichy regime alongside Claude Roy, but quit soon to join the ranks of the French Resistance. During the Nazi occupation, he contributed to Combat, the clandestine newspaper of the Resistance, and participated in the Resistance radio movement along with Maurice Bourdet and Pierre Schaeffer, preparing shows for the future "radio libre" (free radio) at a semi-secret Paris studio. He struck friendships with André Malraux and Albert Camus, and became a follower of General Charles de Gaulle. He co-edited Combat with Camus at the time of the liberation of France in 1944 but quit in 1945. By October 1945, he was a member of the editorial committee of Jean-Paul Sartre's Les Temps modernes.
