= Raif Khoury =

Lebanese writer

Raif Khoury (c. 1913–1967) was a Lebanese writer, poet, essayist, novelist and playwright who was born in Nabay, Lebanon, then part of the Ottoman Empire towards the beginning of the twentieth century. He went to school in the neighboring town of Brummana to Broummana High School, where he started writing poetry at a very early age. He joined the American University of Beirut as an Arabic literature and history major and graduated with a BA in 1932. Even before he graduated, he started writing in literary magazines and papers such as Al Barq, Al Adib and Al Adab which were issued in Beirut at the time. He was a member of the League Against Nazism and Fascism in Syria and Lebanon which was founded in 1939. He founded a magazine entitled Al Tariq with other members of the League in 1941.

During his lifetime, Khoury wrote more than 20 books and numerous articles in many of the literary magazines and journals as well as daily newspapers of his time.

== Books and articles by Raif Khoury ==
- Modern Arab Thought. Translation of al Fikr al-'Arabi al-hadith (in Arabic), introduction by Charles Philip Issawi, Ihsan AbbasTranslator. Kingston Press, 1983.
- Thawrat baydaba (in Arabic). Beirut: Matba‘at Rawdat al-Funun, 1936.
- Huquq al-insan: min ayna wa ila ayna al-masir? (in Arabic). Damascus: Matba‘at Ibn Zaydun, 1937.

Taqrir al-lajna al-tahdhiriyya fi mu’tamar mukafaha al-fashistiyya (in Arabic). Al Tali‘a, no. 5 (May 1939): 349 – 58.

‘Firansa ‘amin 1789’ (in Arabic). Al Tali‘a, no. 7 (July 1939): 545 – 64.

Ma‘alim al-wa‘i al-qawmi (in Arabic). Beirut: Dar al-Makshuf, 1941.

“Arabi janthur ila al-‘alam’ (in Arabic). Al Tariq, no. 8 (30 April 1942): 2 – 3, 21 – 4.

Turath al-qawmi al-‘arabi. Beirut: Manshurat Majallat al-Tariq, 1942.

‘A insan faiq am wahish’ (in Arabic). Al Makshuf, no. 377 (15 Dec. 1944): 6 – 8.

Al-adab al-masul (in Arabic). Beirut: Dar al-Adab, 1989.

Turath al-qawmi

== Books and articles on Raif Khoury ==
Götz Nordbruch and Malakeh Khoury. Raif Khoury. In Twentieth-century Arabic writers: Dictionary of Literary Biography, edited by Majd Al-Mallah and Coeli Fitzpatrick (South Carolina: Bruccoli Clark Layman, 2008)

Al-Badawi al-Mulaththam. ‘Faqid al-adab al-‘arabi raif khuri’ (in Arabic). Al Adib, no. 3 (March 1968): 52 – 3.

Götz Nordbruch. Defending the French Revolution during World War II: Raif Khoury and the Intellectual Challenge of Nazism in the Levant. Mediterranean Historical Review. Published online: 15 Feb 2007 doi:10.1080/09518960601030142

Tawq, Antoine. Raif Khoury. Dissertation. Faculty of Education, Lebanese University. 1973

‘Ulabi, Ahmad. ‘Raif khuri (1913 – 1967). Masira adib mukafih’ (in Arabic). Al Mashriq, no.2 (Aug. – Dec. 2005): 353 – 77.

Al-Hilu, Yussuf Khattar. ‘Ma‘a raif khuri’ (in Arabic). al-Tariq, no. 1 (Feb. 1989): 126 – 30.

Dakrub, Muhammad. 'Min masirat raif khuri’ (in Arabic).al-Tariq, no. 1 (Feb. 1989): 135 – 47

Abdulrazak Eid. ‘Raif khuri wa “ma‘alim al-wa‘i al-qawmi” — juzur al-tabi‘iyya fi-l-fikr al- qawmi’. al-Nahj20 (1988): 216 – 25

Abdulrazak Eid. Madkhal ila fikr raif khuri(in Arabic)An introduction to the thought of Raif Khoury. Nicosia: Ibal, 1990

Idriss, Samah. Raif khuri wa turath al-‘arab (in Arabic). Beirut: Dar al-Adab, 1986

Issawi, Charles. Introduction to Modern Arab Thought: Channels of the French Revolution to the Arab East, by Raif Khoury. Translated by Ihsan Abbas. Princeton: Kingston Press, 1983.

Sadiq, Habib. ‘Raif khuri: kayfa raa ila sahyuniyya, kayfa nadala fi muqawamatiha’ (in Arabic). al-Tariq, no. 1 (Feb. 1989): 84 – 107.

Mruwa, Karim. ‘Al-muthaqqaf wa al-thawra. haqaiq ‘an raif khuri’ (in Arabic). al-Tariq, no.1(Feb. 1989): 5 – 18. Yussuf Khattar. ‘Ma‘a raif khuri’ (in Arabic). al-Tariq, no. 1 (Feb. 1989): 126 – 30. Dakrub, Muhammad. 'Min masirat raif khuri’ (in Arabic).al-Tariq 5 KB (669 words) - 02:33, 1 October 2018
