= Al Adib =

Literary magazine in Lebanon (1942–1983)

- Categories: Literary magazine
- Frequency: Monthly
- Founder: Albert Adib
- Founded: 1942
- First issue: January 1942
- Final issue: August–December 1983
- Country: Lebanon
- Based in: Beirut
- Language: Arabic
- OCLC: 1001507113

Al Adib (Arabic: مجلة الأديب, lit. 'The Man of Letters') was a literary magazine which was based in Beirut, Lebanon. It was founded and edited by the Lebanese poet Albert Adib, and its title was a reference to his surname. The magazine existed between 1942 and 1983.

== History and profile ==
Al Adib was started in Beirut in January 1942. Its founder and editor was the poet Albert Adib. In addition to literary work, Al Adib covered articles on arts, science, politics and sociology. The magazine supported modernism and became an outlet for intellectuals from different backgrounds. The magazine supported the view that poems should not be necessarily dependent on meter encouraging prose-like poems.

Al Adib folded after the publication of the issue dated August–December 1983. Some of its issues were archived by the Palestinian Museum.

== Contributors ==
Al Adib featured articles not only by Lebanese writers, but also by other Arab figures from various countries. Their ideological origins were not homogenous. However, they all had the belief that individual rights were the cornerstone of the civic order.

Its major Lebanese contributors included Raif Khoury, Omar Fakhoury, Elias Abu Shabaki, Elias Khalil Zakharia, Michel Trad and Gabriel Jabbour. Other regular contributors were Wadih Palestine from Egypt, Edmond Rabbath from Syria Issa Naouri, and Thurayyā Malḥas, from Jordan. In the first issue dated January 1942 the Lebanese journalist Gebran Andraos Tueni published an article in which he argued that not dictatorial rules but democratic states should be supported. Poet Salah Al Asir published a controversial article in 1944 in Al Adib in which he developed a categorization of the contemporary Arab poets by their country of origin. However, he did not mention any poet of the Palestinian origin in the list. Another contributor Ishaq Musa Al Husseini argued that access to the Palestinian poets and other literary figures was not easy for readers due to the fact that they did not publish books, but limited their contributions to certain magazines.
