= Mawaqif =

Cultural magazine in Lebanon (1968–1994)

- Categories: Cultural magazine
- Founder: Adunis
- Founded: 1968
- Final issue: 1994
- Country: Lebanon
- Based in: Beirut
- Language: Arabic

Mawaqif (also variously spelled Mawakif; "Positions" in English) was a cultural magazine founded in Beirut in 1968 by Adunis. It ran until 1994. Among its editors were Khalida Said, Hisham Sharabi, Halim Barakat, Elias Khoury, Kamal Boullata, and Edward Said.

== Reception and legacy ==
It was described by Hisham Sharabi as situated on the vanguard of a "new critical movement" at that time in Arab thought. Another scholar said that the magazine "delved into a reassessment of the political style of the two decades that had passed and of the very language and vocabulary of politics of the time."

Prof. Sabry Hafez, as part of a historical overview on cultural journals in Arabic, said of the magazine:

"In its early years in Beirut, before the Lebanese civil war, it published some of the best creative and critical output of Arab culture, and raised in its subsequent issues—published from London in the late 1980s and early 1990s—some of the significant issues of modernism in literature and critical theory. These three journals [Mawaqif alongside Shi'r and Hiwar] initiated a rupture in the previously integrated cultural field, ended its pan-Arab cohesion, and foreshadowed a polarization in the political field that followed."
