= Michel Trad =

Michel Mousa Mitri Trad (October 21, 1912 - February 8, 1998) (in Arabic ميشال موسى متري طراد) was a Lebanese poet considered to be brilliant in Lebanese zajal poetry like Walim Saab, Emile Moubarak, Fouad Abu Ghanem, Adib AL-Attar, and Zaghloul AL-Damour. Trad, who lived in Zahle, was recognized for his work that often included love, women, and the beauty of Lebanon's nature, specifically, his home town Baskinta. His poems were commemorated in songs by Wadih Al-Safi, Fairouz, and Marcel Khalife. They were also translated to other languages like English and French. His work was the subject of a thesis at the Cambridge University of the United Kingdom.

Michel Trad was known to be a zealous poet who honored and praised Lebanon along with its language through his work. Not only did he manage to translate his thoughts into eloquent words that emphasized an enriched Lebanese culture, but he also sought to make his work appropriate and accessible to all Lebanese citizens, prompting them to embrace the Lebanese language and its glory.

== Early life ==
Michel Trad was born on 21 October 1912, in Zahlé, a city in Beqaa Governorate in Lebanon, to Lebanese parents, Musa Trad and Mohiba Ayoub. At the age of six, Michel Trad, along with his mother and sister, moved into his grandparents' house in Baskinta following the death of his father. Trad received his elementary education in the Eastern Muskobiya School (االمدرسة المسكوبية الشرقية) in his home town, then in the Frere School in Baskinta. In 1928, he moved to Frere School in Zahle for one year, then to La Sagesse School in Beirut, Universal Collage of Aley, and earned his secondary certificate in Homs, Syria in 1932.

Trad then became a teacher at Thalathat Akmar School (in Arabic مدرسة ثلاثة أقمار) in Beirut for two years (1932-1935). After that, he worked at the National Museum of Beirut. In 1942, he was selected to be the director of Antiquities of Baalbek Castle until he retired in 1973.

== Career life ==
Michel Trad worked as a teacher in Three Moons School or Thalathat Akmar School (in Arabic مدرسة ثلاثة أقمار). After that, he worked as an intern at a national library in 1939. In 1941, he joined the Directorate General of Antiquities and worked as a writer at the National Museum. In 1942, he moved to Baalbek to become the manager of Beqaa Valley Ruins. He was among the contributors of the Beirut-based literary magazine Al Adib.

Despite his passion for poetry at the time, Michel Trad had also worked in a co-op that was associated to the Riyaq military barracks (in Arabic الكوبراتيف). Although Trad detested being an employee there, he had both a good salary and a special transportation from Zahle to Riyaq. Not only did Trad earn £L18 per month, he was also offered one of the used soldiers' bikes as a means of transportation by one of Trad's biggest fans, the army officer that supervised the co-op. Even though Trad had a good salary and a decent ride to and from work, he detested being an employee and had always thought that 'the devil of money'' was seducing him with the £L18 that he used to earn. Trad's income was considered to be large back then. Nevertheless, he did not fail to waste it which left him with only little money to last him until the end of the month. He used to spend the £L15 accordingly: £L4 on cigarettes, £L8 on drinking arak (in Arabic عرق) near Berdawni, and £L3 for his grandmother at home, leaving him with only £L3 to sustain him. Even with his desperate need for the money, Trad believed he was capable of surviving without it and that working at the military barracks limited him and left him with little time to concentrate on his poetry. That is when it hit him that he needed to quit his job, pursue a career in writing, and consequently, fulfill his destiny.

== Personal life ==
In 1950, Trad married Aghniya Abu Haidar and had three kids, Jolnar, George, and Musa.

== Awards ==
In November, 1964, Michel Trad won the “Said Akl Award” for his collection of poems “Leish”.

== Published works ==
- Laish, 1964, 173 pages
- Kass 'a shfaf al-dene, 1973, 152 pages
- Julnar, 1978, 133 pages
- al-ghurab al-a'war, 1986, 131 pages
- 'arabiyye mkhalla'a, 1986, 156 pages
- dulab, 1993, 151 pages
- wardi b-eed al-reeh, 1993, 128 pages

== Death and legacy ==
Trad died on 8 February 1998.
