= Committed literature =

Committed literature (French: littérature engagée) can be defined as an approach of an author, poet, novelist, playwright or composer who commits their work to defend or assert an ethical, political, social, ideological or religious view, most often through their works but also can loosely be defined as being through their direct intervention as an "intellectual", in public affairs (Crowly, 2018). Historically, a work is said to have achieved the status of committed within the sphere of committed literature when it has social of political influence for the defence or assertion of the aforementioned view. It can also achieve this status when the importance on a given subject is recognised and it has "open-ended engagement with contemporary history” (Gasiorek & James, 2012, p. 613). It has also been defined as the author, composer, poet, writer or playwright taking sides in order to take action (Patterson, 2015). Additionally, it has been argued that committed literature rose to popularity within socialist circles within the fifties which aligns with the strong political movements characteristic of the time period. Taha Hussain in June 1947 may have been the first to use the term within his Les Temps Modernes. The concept was then led not long after by some existentialist writers like Jean- Paul Sartre exploring the definition in his work What Is Literature? and Lebanese literary magazine Al Adab as one of the followers of this approach.

== Sartre and Committed Literature ==
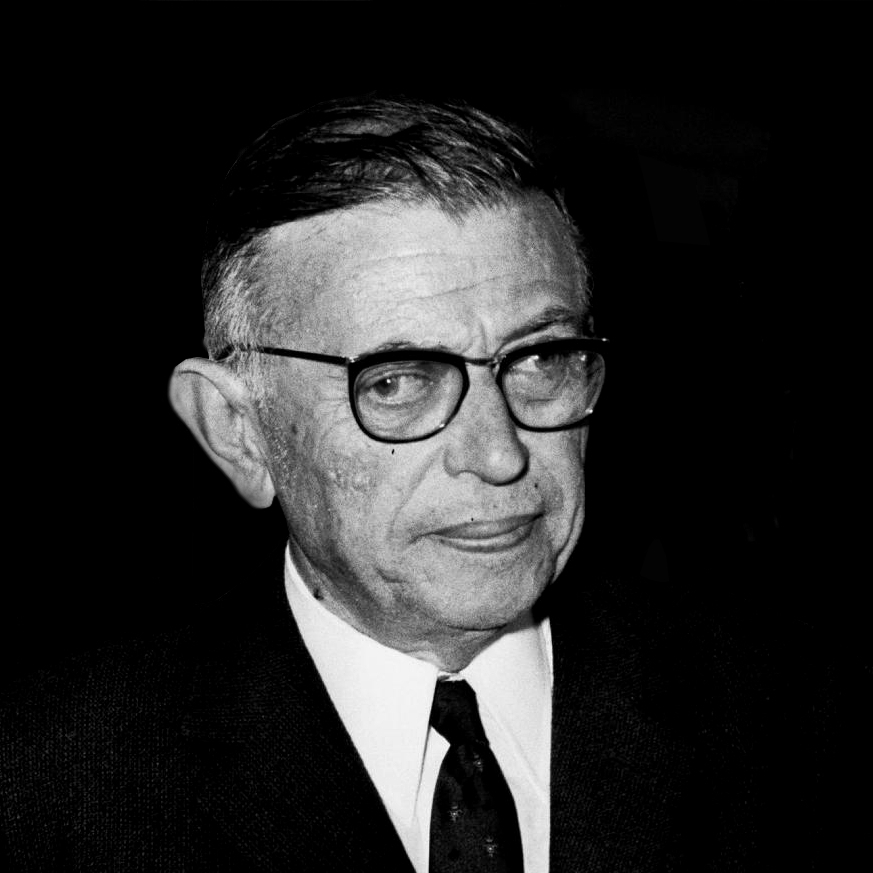
Sartre, 1967

Since the mid 20th century, Committed Literature has been historically tied to Sartrean Existentialism especially his work “What is Literature?” (1948) (Crowley, 2018). In the aftermath of World War Two, Jean-Paul Sartre worked to define the role, purpose and overall concept of Committed Literature when he analysed what the role of the contemporary writer should be, stating that it was their goal to compose “literature of praxis” (Gasiorek & James, 2012, p. 614) which is openly engaged with contemporary society and history in order to be Committed and inspire social change (Boria, 2013). Sartre perceived that the purpose of the author was to make history, using words as instruments of action (Sartre, 1988 as cited in Barone, 2000). This concept was first addressed in his work “What Is Literature?” in which he considered the discourse between the artist's private and public commitment in a time of a seemingly imperceivable and unreachable public that did not know the perceived necessity of reading (Gasiorek & James, 2012). Sartre links artistic literary Commitment to ethics and politics in a manner that he believed portrayed a world presentation demanding human freedom (Sartre, 1948 as cited in Gasiorek & James, 2012). Here he saw freedom as the sole main subject of man (Sartre, 1988 as cited in Barone, 2000). This while a conceptual claim can be used to define the basis of Committed literature (Gasiorek & James, 2012). It is also to be noted that Sartre saw a distinct difference between prose and poetry, where the latter utilises committed language in “designating things” (Noudelmann, 2019) not the committed writing of the former which “shaped and transforms reality” (Noudelmann, 2019). He saw literature to be linked with politics and preached the inevitability of the honest writer being a revolutionary if recounting his own consistent path to politics (Gerassi, 2009 p. 211 as cited in Boria, 2013). Sartre's work has been regarded as a call for “oppositional texts” (Barone, 2000) and to connect audiences to “a manner of being” (Suhl, 1970 as cited in Barone, 2000). Overall, he saw Committed literature as an art that was meant to reach the masses, forgoing the literary pathway of appeal to fellow intellectuals and “scholarly detachment” (Barone, 2000).

== Scholarly contributions ==
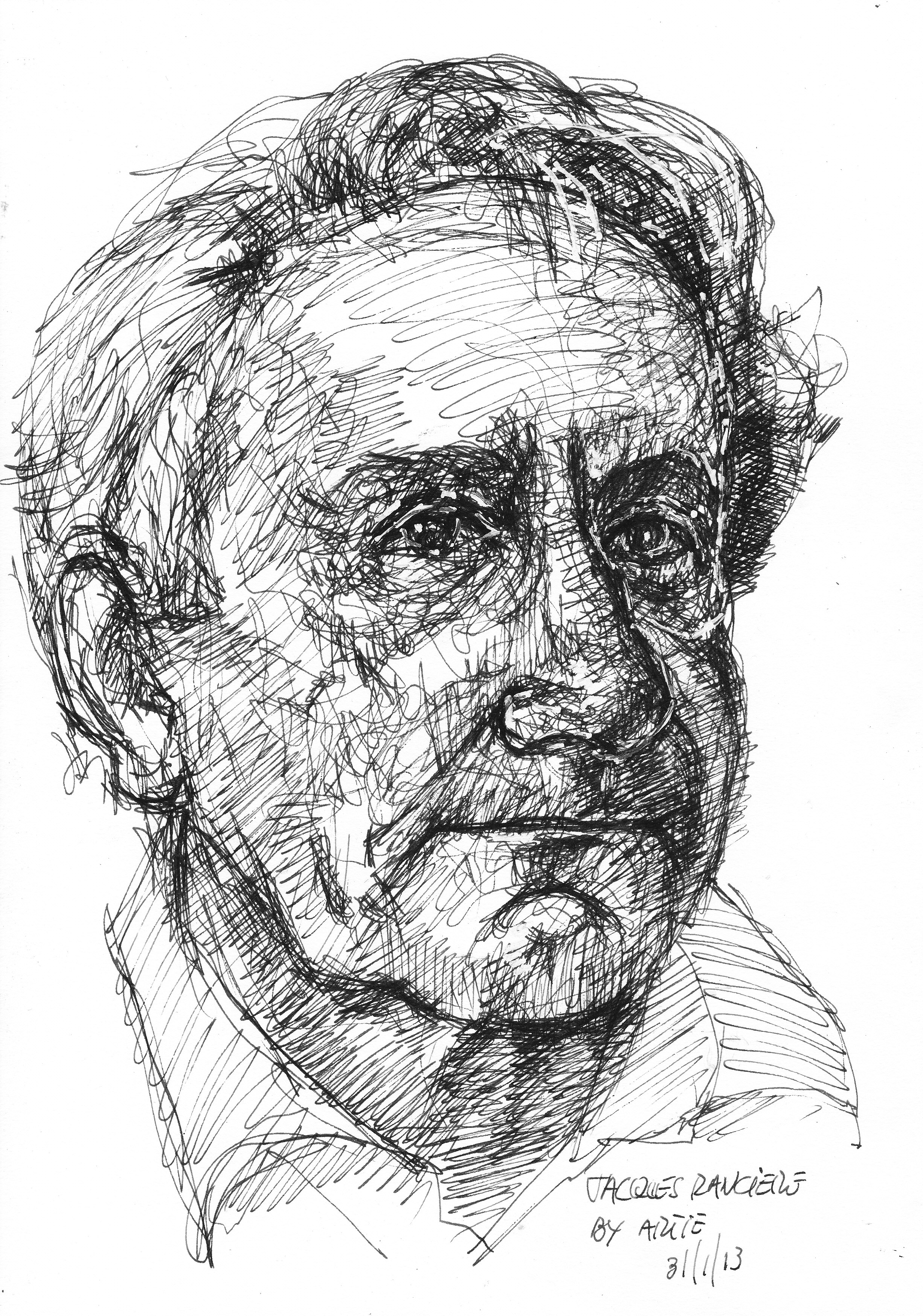
Jacques Rancière

It is important to understand that Sartre is not the only understanding of Committed Literature that is valuable and gives meaning to the genre and its political and cultural connections. Other scholars have understandings to offer

Saul Bellow provided an all-encompassing statement about the complexity of committed literature as a genre, stating the difficulty of defining the “moral novelist or...commitment...” (Bellow, 1963 as cited in Gasiorek, & James, 2012). Like this line of questioning, many other scholars expressed their own understandings beyond the singular perception of Sartre. Phillips warns against the assumption of overly aggressive assertion of political commitment and instead advocates for the power of literary commitment being “whispered” (Phillips, as cited in Gasiorek, & James, 2012). A later understanding is Bentley's exploration of the notion that commitment may not hold meaning for individual authors, rather the concept is difficult to define with newer crossing identities, issues and literary focuses (Bentley, 2005 as cited in Gasiorek, & James, 2012). Additionally, committed literature and the literary action it conjures is, according to Barthes, a transformation of the intangible concept to meaning, an exemplar metaphor stated like how you would turn “...memory into a useful act...”(Barthes, 168 as cited in Just 2013).

Jacques Rancière also provided additional understanding to what constituted as committed literature, defining it as a different relationship and sense of being between words, world's communities and people. He also stated it as being in the ‘spirit of analysis and scepticism’ a spirit that made words aiding the rational needs of equality population management.

Committed Literature as a primarily political writing style has been subject to much criticism. Among these is the writings of Albert Camus. He has been known as criticising Sartre's philosophy of Committed Literature to be that of self-righteousness and blind activism without regard for reality, instead, he focuses on abstract history (Just, 2013). Camus continued this stance in his Nobel Peace Prize speech where he emphasised the importance of the writer's understanding rather than imposing judgement (Just, 2013). Similarly, Blanchot argues for the writer to be uninvolved with politics because their understanding is disillusioned and that the role of the composer should be more powerless (Just, 2013).

James Engell sparks criticism in favour of committed literature stating that self absorbed literary and cultural criticism leading to solipsism and diminishing the power of language to be politically motivated with the ability to make cultural change (Womersley, 2001). He argues for the wrongness of literature being isolated from public life even though he in the same strain believes political commitment to be inevitably and inextricably linked to politics. Engell advocates for revitalising literature by forming a deeper more meaningful connection with political and cultural values His work The Committed Word outlines 'models of engagement' that intend to instruct the reader on ways to change and form a changed present (Womersley, 2001). He takes this stance as a reflection of a belief that 'the difficult problems facing society most fully disclose themselves and are successfully resolved, or not, through language" and that liberty itself is bound to language (Womersley, 2001).

== Forms of Committed Literature ==
Sartre, as a prominent figure in the foundations of defining committed literature, has had his understanding criticised and evolved into modern reiterations with the considered forms of committed literature not being exempt. A Sartrean definition of committed literature was largely based on the book or novel as the “noblest” (Sartre, 1988, p. 216-217 as cited in Barone, 2000) form, however, he also alluded to the “literary art of radio, film editorial and reporting” (Sartre, 1988, p. 216-217 as citied in Barone, 2000) meaning Committed Literature can be understood as Sartre did, broadly, without the formalities of structuralism to assume many different forms (Barone, 2000). However, it has also been suggested that Sartre dismissed poetry, distinguishing it from the capabilities of prose (Noudelmann, 2019). This view has been criticised in order to modernise and strengthen the understanding of Committed Literature. A change in thinking is present when Sartre acknowledges commitment in African poems within Orphée noir (Noudelmann, 2019). Other modern critics like Kohlmann have suggested that through a case analysis of Empson's efforts to write non-politically committed poetry, poetry is inherently a form just as susceptible to being a committed piece and “taking sides” (Patterson, 2015, p. 798) as the novel or any other form of literature (Patterson, 2015, p. 798).

== Different Political Concerns of Committed Literature ==
Most committed literature can be understood as aligning itself with a political cause or ethical agenda or ideology. This kind of commitment as Howe claims is the means by which people claim abstract control over the abstract social life through ideas and passion. In the same line of argument, self-satisfying literature can be claimed as a luxury from which politically committed literature must distance itself from (Howe, as citied in Redfern, 2015)

=== Postcolonialism ===
Postcolonialism can be argued to have a distinct link to committed literature with decolonisation and nationalism as a cause for which a composer, author, poet or writer may dedicate or ‘commit’ their work too. As an example of the link between postcolonialism and committed literature, the growing need for a Postcolonial identity contributed to the rise of committed literature in the Arab Middle East during the 1950s. This was labelled as iltizām (commitment) and featured an emphasis on nationalism and decolonisation (Dransfeldt, 2021).

Fredric Jameson proposed a ‘national allegory’ and the notion that ‘third-world’ texts are allegorical and derived from the conflicted society and culture of this world (Jameson as cited in Dransfeldt, 2021). These can be connected together as a committed narrative but also critiqued under those such as Réda Bensmaïa as not being the author's primary purpose or commitment (Bensmaïa as cited in Dransfeldt, 2021). He

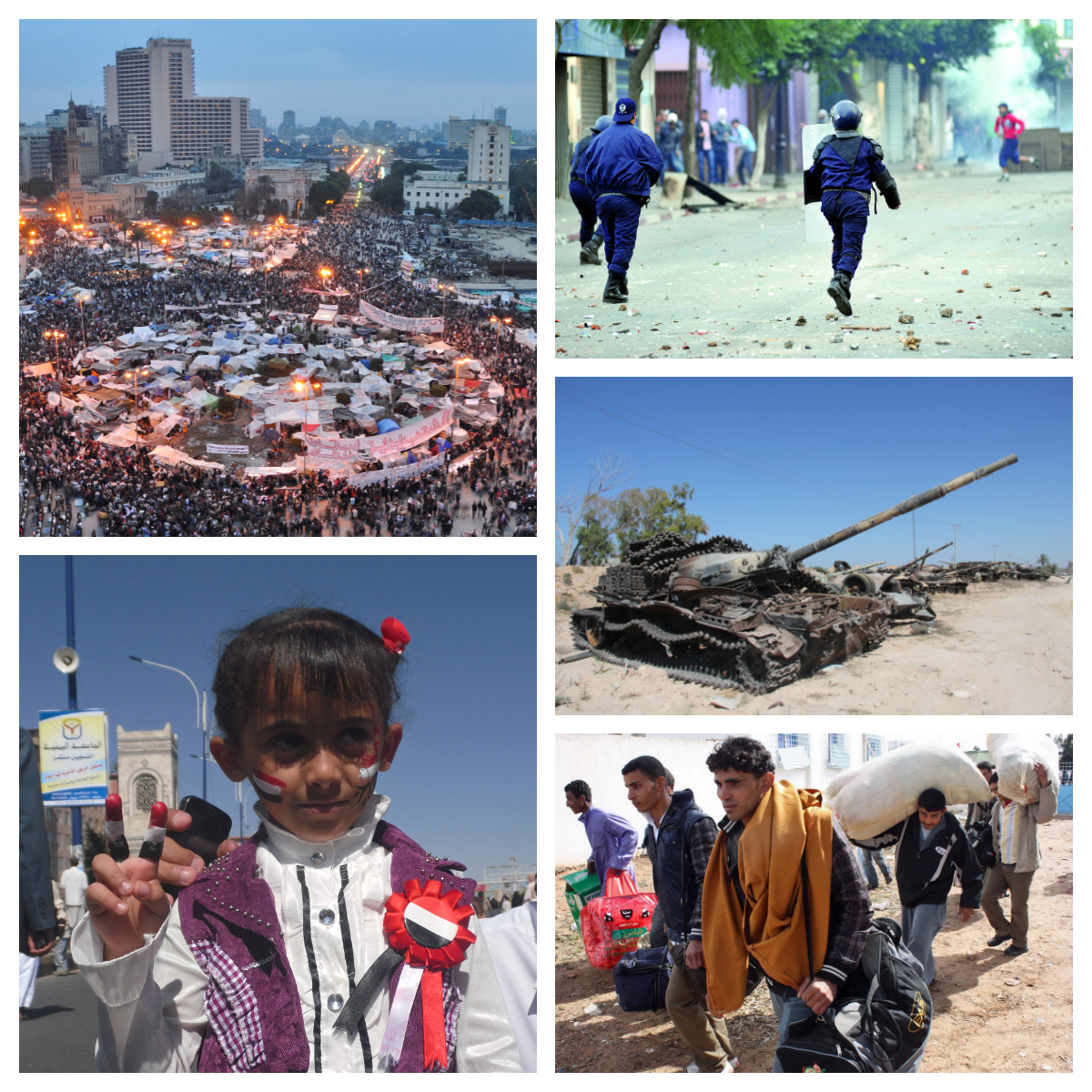
Arab Spring

=== Feminism ===
Feminist writing can be defined as another socio-political cause to which committed writers may focus their work and take the form of commitment within Committed Literature circles. As a leading example of this Sasser Nasser points to Arab women writers and their creative personal engagement with democratic political change through Committed literature. This style of writing was identified as being politically invested in Arab women's autonomy and rights as well as a method of dissent against corruption and injustice, particularly during the Arab Spring. Examples of this include El Saadawi's The Fall of the Imam Nawal and Ahdaf Soueif's Cairo: My City, Our Revolution which have been identified as core Arab feminist texts that both embody a politically revolutionary commitment to women's autonomy and rights coupled with the Arab Spring general uprising. While this is a narrowed example it can be used as an example for what feminist Committed Literature looks like in the world of literature.

== Committed Literature Magazine in Iran ==
By virtue of Article 13 of Press Law ratified on 19/03/1986 by Islamic Consultative Assembly (Parliament) this license for publication of the magazine titled Adabiyatemoteahed (Committed Literature) focused on Poetry and Fiction in Persian to be published on monthly basis and circulated in the country is issued. The journal welcomes articles on a wide range of genres, including poetry, drama, novel, fiction. It pursues scholarly studies of modern and contemporary literature and encourages innovative approaches, interdisciplinary and comparative studies, and articles that frame their analysis of modern texts in broader literary theoretical, cultural, or historical debates. Director-in-Charge and Editor-in-Chief is Parsa Nazari.
