= Khalida Said =

Khalida Said (Arabic: خاليدة سعيد; alternate spellings Khalida Saeed, Khalida Sa'id) is a Syrian-origin author and literary critic. She has taught and published extensively on Arabic literature and culture since 1957.

== Early life and background ==
Said was born in Latakia, Syria. She studied arts, including apprenticing with the well-known artist Mahmoud Jalal.

She joined the Teachers’ Training Institute in Damascus and then went on to further studies of Arabic literature in Damascus followed by the Lebanese University in Beirut. She completed her PhD in Arabic literature at the Sorbonne.

Said met the writer Adonis, who she went on to marry, during her time at Teachers College. Adonis has said in an interview that he "never publish[ed] anything without her looking at it; he described their marriage as a "deep intellectual friendship."

Khalida joined the Syrian Social Nationalist Party (SSNP) and was imprisoned because of her party activities.

== Professional achievements ==
She moved to Beirut with Adonis in late 1956. Starting the following year, she published in the historic magazine Shi'r, initially under the pen name Khuzama Sabri and later under her own name. Topics of early interest for Said included the poetry of Nazik Al-Mala'ika, Fadwan Tuqan, Mohammad al-Maghut, Ounsi El Hage, and others. During this period she also taught in several Lebanese high schools and Lebanese University.

Among her lasting contributions to the field of Arab cultural studies was an encyclopedic work on "The Arab Theater Movement in Lebanon, Experiments and Horizons, 1960–1975." The literary magazine Al Jadid reports that it is "one of the most important—and perhaps the most important—reference book on the Lebanese theater movement."

In addition to original works, she has also published various translations.

The literary magazine Banipal dedicated an issue to Said in 2022. It included articles about her by Abdo Wazen, Akl Awit, and others.

=== Publications ===
- al-Bahth ‘An al-Juthour (The Quest for Roots), Beirut: Sh‘ir Magazine Press, 1960.
- Al-Harakat al-Masrahiyya fi Lubnan, Tajarab wa Afaq, 1960-1975 (The Arab Theater Movement in Lebanon, Experiments and Horizons, 1960–1975). Beirut: Theater Committee of Baalbek International Festivals, 1999.
- Yutubiya al-Madina al-Muthaqqafa (Utopia of the Cultured City)

== See also ==
- Sh'ir
- Mawaqif
