= Suhayl Idris =

Lebanese novelist, short-story writer, journalist and translator

Suhayl Idris (1925 – February 19, 2008) was a Lebanese novelist, short-story writer, journalist and translator.

== Biography ==
Idris studied in Beirut before going on to study in Paris and receive a PhD from Sorbonne. His first collection, Ashwaq, was published in 1947. Idriss returned to Beirut in 1952 where he founded Al Adab, a monthly literary journal that became one of the leading periodicals of its kind. Several of his novels have autobiographical themes, including al-Hayy al-Latini (1954) and al-Khandaq al-ghamiq (1958).

Idris also translated many European works, including most of Jean-Paul Sartre and Albert Camus. He had a pro-Nasserist and Arab nationalist political stance.

Idris died on February 19, 2008.
