= International Nazim Hikmet Poetry Award =

The International Nazim Hikmet Poetry Award is an award created in memory of Turkish poet Nâzım Hikmet Ran. The medal is awarded every two years to world poets and writers.

== Nâzım Hikmet ==
A famous Turkish poet, playwright, novelist, memoirist, painter, public figure, International Peace Prize laureate and the founder of the Turkish revolutionary poetry, Nâzım Hikmet Ran was born on 15 January 1902 in Salonica. He was the son of an Ottoman government official and grew up in Anatolia. After briefly attending the Turkish naval academy, he studied economics and political science at the University of Moscow. Nazim Hikmet was repeatedly arrested for his political beliefs and spent much of his adult life in prison or in exile. His poetry has been translated into more than fifty languages, plays have been staged in several countries gaining huge popularity.

Nazim Hikmet's first book of poetry was “Song of the Sun-drinkers”, published in Baku in 1928. Many of his works have been translated into English, including "Human Landscapes from My Country: An Epic Novel in Verse" (2009), "Things I Didn’t Know I Loved" (1975), "The Day Before Tomorrow" (1972), "The Moscow Symphony" (1970), and "Selected Poems" (1967). In 1936 he published Seyh Bedreddin destani (“The Epic of Shaykh Bedreddin”) and Memleketimden insan manzaralari (“Portraits of People from My Land”). In 1950 he won the Nobel Peace Prize.

Hikmet died of a heart attack in Moscow in 1963. As the first modern Turkish poet, he is recognized around the world as one of the great international poets of the twentieth century.

== Nazim Hikmet Culture and Arts Foundation ==
After the death of Nazim Hikmet his close friends under the leadership of his sister Samia Yaltirim and Prof.Dr.Aydin Aybay decided to set up a foundation in his name. Due to his friends efforts, the “Nazim Hikmet Culture and Arts Foundation” was established by Samia Yaltirim in 1991.

The purpose of “Nazim Hikmet Culture and Arts Foundation” was to establish a center which will collect and introduce any articles, books, pictures, paintings, movies, music, sculpture, memorials and research about Nazim Hikmet to future generations.

In order to always cherish the memory of Nazim Hikmet, to ensure the dissemination of his works and to assess contribution of contemporary poets the foundation established "International Nazim Hikmet Poetry Award".

== Award holders ==
The first winner of the "International Nazim Hikmet Poetry Award" ceremony which held on January 14, 1995, considering the value of artistic and intellectual properties of works was Syrian poet Adonis, who is currently living in France.

The second winner of "International Nazim Hikmet Poetry Award" was Aime Cesaire from Martinique in 1997. He won this award for explaining in detail the longing for freedom and equality of all oppressed people in the twentieth century.

The third winner of "International Nazim Hikmet Poetry Award" was the Palestinian poet Mahmoud Darwish in 2003. Then a next winner was the Danish poet Erik Stinus in 2009. Erik Stinus moves his readers away from the character of Danish poetry. On the other hand, Stinus is a poet of Western poetry who focuses on life and who bears witness to his era. I n recent years there have been some problems for nominating the "International Nazim Hikmet Poetry Award" every two years, such as financial deficiencies and the attracting of voters from the international organization.

Finally, after a long time off, on February 7, 2014, due to the positive contribution towards Turkish World and the tenderness of his poetry, Zalimkhan Yagub was awarded with "International Nazim Hikmet Poetry Award" by The International Academy of Sciences of Turkish World Investigation. Zalimkhan Yaghub was the first poet from Azerbaijan who was honoured with that medal.
