= Les Temps modernes =

French bimonthly literary magazine (1945–2019)

- Categories: Literary magazine
- Frequency: Bimonthly
- Founder: Jean-Paul Sartre; Simone de Beauvoir
- First issue: 1945
- Final issue: 2019
- Company: Éditions Gallimard
- Country: France
- Based in: Paris
- Language: French
- Website: gallimard.fr
- ISSN: 0040-3075

Les Temps modernes (lit. 'Modern Times') was a French post-World War II literary magazine, founded at Éditions Gallimard by Jean-Paul Sartre with Simone de Beauvoir to substitute La Nouvelle Revue française, discontinued due to its collaboration with the Nazi occupiers.

The first issue of Les Temps modernes appeared in October 1945. It was later published by Julliard (January 1949 to September 1965) and by the Presses d'aujourd'hui (October 1964 to March 1985) before returning to Gallimard in April 1985. It ceased publication in 2019, after 74 years.

== Early history ==
In late October 1944, following the liberation of Paris in late August and the launch of épuration légale, Jean-Paul Sartre met with Jean Bruller and Pierre Seghers, two fellow members of the Commission d'épuration de la librairie et de l'édition (Commission for the Purification of Bookstores and Publishing). They struck a deal that suppressed the collaborationist La Nouvelle Revue française (which General de Gaulle wanted to restart due to its prestige abroad) but preserved Sartre's publisher, Gallimard. Jean Paulhan, who remained a key member of the NRF's editorial team during the Nazi occupation and sought to revive the magazine in early August 1944 with Sartre as a prospective regular contributor, was appointed as the magazine's liquidator. Still in October 1944, a new editorial project took shape at Gallimard under Sartre's direction that moved away from Paulhan's aspirations by proclaiming "committed literature". While the status of the publishing house would be secured, the NRF old guard (André Gide, Jean Schlumberger) saw this as a coup perpetrated by the young generation. Provisionally called La Condition humaine, Sartre's project was renamed to Les Temps modernes in December 1944, in a reference to the 1936 film Modern Times by Charlie Chaplin.

Much as the NRF had been considered André Gide's magazine, Les Temps modernes became Sartre's magazine from its initial issue of 15 October 1945. The first editorial board consisted of Sartre (director), his school friend Raymond Aron, Simone de Beauvoir, Michel Leiris, Maurice Merleau-Ponty, Albert Ollivier, and Jean Paulhan. Sartre's own early contributions to the journal included "La nationalisation de la littérature" ("The Nationalisation of Literature"), "Matérialisme et révolution" ("Materialism and Revolution"), and "Qu'est-ce-que la littérature?" ("What is Literature?"). Simone de Beauvoir first published chapters of Le Deuxième Sexe ("The Second Sex") in Les Temps modernes.

In the preface to the first issue, Sartre stated the review's purpose: to publish littérature engagée. This philosophy of literature expressed a basic tenet of existentialism—that an individual is responsible for making conscious decisions to commit socially useful acts. Thus, literature in the magazine would have a utilitarian component; it would not be just culturally valuable ("art for art's sake"). Other intellectuals, such as André Gide, André Breton, and Louis Aragon, disapproved of this orientation. Sartre's response was: "Le monde peut fort bien se passer de la littérature. Mais il peut se passer de l'homme encore mieux." ("The world can easily get along without literature. But it can get along even more easily without man.")

The works of many writers appeared in Les Temps modernes. They include Richard Wright, Jean Genet, Nathalie Sarraute, Boris Vian, and Samuel Beckett.

Political divisions between board members soon surfaced. Raymond Aron quit in 1945 because of the magazine's Communist sympathies, becoming an editor at Le Figaro. Jean Paulhan, who had resented his relegation to the background and opposed the line of political engagement, left by April 1946 to pursue a new project, Cahiers de la Pléiade (he went on to revive the NRF in 1953). At the time of the Korean War of 1950–1953, Merleau-Ponty resigned. Originally more supportive of Communism than Sartre, he moved progressively to the right as Sartre moved to the left. At the time, Sartre still endorsed Communism in his writings but in private expressed his reservations.

Sartre, who disapproved of Camus for refusing to take sides in the Algerian War of 1954–1962, chose Francis Jeanson, who did not like the works of Camus, to review the latter's essay L'Homme Révolté (The Rebel) in the magazine. The reaction of Camus prompted Sartre to put the final blow to their long friendship. As Sartre put it to Camus, "Vous êtes devenu la proie d'une morne démesure qui masque vos difficultés intérieures. ... Tôt ou tard, quelqu'un vous l'eût dit, autant que ce soit moi." ("You have become the victim of an excessive sullenness that masks your internal problems. ... Sooner or later, someone would have told you, so it might as well be me.")

== 1960–2019 ==
Les Temps modernes enjoyed its greatest influence in the 1960s. At this time, it had more than 20,000 subscribers. During the Algerian War (1954–1962) it strongly supported the National Liberation Front, the primary group in the ultimately successful battle against the French. It fiercely denounced the extensive use of torture by French forces, opposed Charles de Gaulle's government, and supported desertion and resistance to conscription. The journal printed testimonies by French soldiers denouncing the war and torture from 1958 to 1962. For this, it was censured and its premises seized.

From its inception the review has published many special issues. These include Sartre's 1946 description of the United States, an attempt to discredit the myths that many of the French held about this country. In 1955, Claude Lanzmann described Sartre's Marxist philosophy in an issue entitled "La Gauche" ("The Left"). An issue on "La révolte hongroise" ("The Hungarian Rebellion") (1956–57) denounced Soviet repression. In 1967, at the time of the Six-Day War, an issue, "Le conflit israélo-arabe" ("The Israeli-Arab conflict"), contained articles by both Israelis and Arabs. The March 1974 issue included a sympathetic dossier on the Red Army Faction prisoners in West Germany by Jean Asselmeyer. In 1977, North African writers led by Abdelkebir Khatibi published the edition Du Maghreb. In 2001, a special edition was devoted to Serge Doubrovsky.

From 2016, the chief editor of Les Temps modernes was Claude Lanzmann until his death on 5 July 2018, after a short illness. The editorial board consisted of Juliette Simont (Editorial Assistant to Lanzmann), Adrien Barrot, Jean Bourgault, Joseph Cohen, Michel Deguy, Liliane Kandel, Jean Khalfa, Patrice Maniglier, Robert Redeker, Marc Sagnol, Gérard Wormser, and Raphael Zagury-Orly. It was published bimonthly.

In 2019, following Lanzmann's death, Les Temps modernes ceased publishing, after 74 years.

== Bibliography ==
- Sapiro, Gisèle (2009), "Un héritage symbolique détourné ? La nouvelle revue française des années noires" (PDF), Études littéraires, 40 (1): 97–117, doi:10.7202/037901ar
