= Al Tariq (magazine) =

Political magazine in Beirut, Lebanon (1941–1945)

Al-Tariq
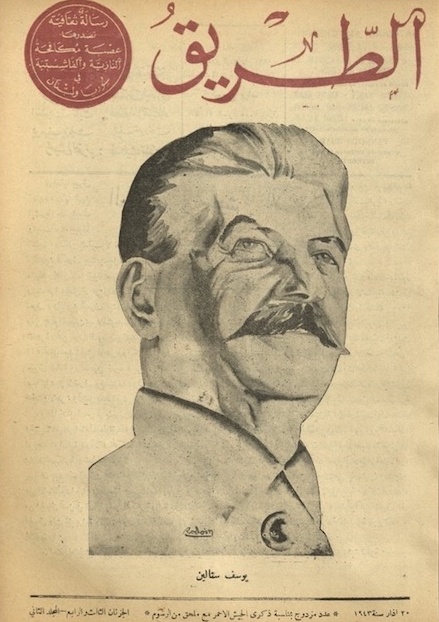
- Cover, 1943
- Editor-in-chief: Qadri Al Qalaji
- Categories: Political magazine
- Frequency: Bimonthly
- Founder: Raif Khoury
- First issue: 20 December 1941
- Final issue: 1945
- Country: Lebanon
- Based in: Beirut
- Language: Arabic

Al Tariq (Arabic: الطريق, romanized: aṭ-Ṭarīq, lit. 'The Road') was a bimonthly political and cultural magazine which existed in Beirut, Lebanon, between 1941 and 1945. It was the media outlet of the League Against Nazism and Fascism in Syria and Lebanon and then of the Partisans of Peace group.

== History and profile ==
Al Tariq was founded by Raif Khoury with the assistance of other members of the League Against Nazism and Fascism in Syria and Lebanon in 1941. The group included leftist figures such as Antun Thabit, Umar Fakhuri, Yusuf Ibrahim Yazbek and Kamil Ayyad. Antun Thabit was the owner of Al Tariq. The first issue of the magazine appeared on 20 December 1941. The cover page of its inaugural issue featured a man who was breaking a huge swastika with an ax into pieces.

Al Tariq was headquartered in Beirut and came out bimonthly. The editorial board of the magazine consisted of Umar Fakhuri, Antun Thabit, Raif Khoury and Yusuf Yazbek. In 1943 Kamil Ayyad joined the editorial board. The editor-in-chief of the magazine was Qadri Al Qalaji.

Al Tariq aimed at informing the masses about the ideological context of ongoing World War II. Over time it became a forum not only for leftist authors, but also for those from other intellectual and political backgrounds. Their common goal was to support the anti-Fascist struggle.

Al Tariq paid a special attention to the Indian leader Jawaharlal Nehru and the Indian poet and social activist Rabindranath Tagore. In the first issue Al Tariq featured quotes from Tagore. In the following issues Nehru was praised in the editorials of the magazine. Following the end of World War II the magazine became an organ of the Partisans of Peace group. One of the contributors was Husayn Muruwwa. It folded in 1945.
