= Harouf =

Harouf حاروف
- Municipality
- Location in Lebanon
- Coordinates: 33°22′20″N 35°26′40″E
- Grid position: 122/160 L
- Country: Lebanon
- Governorate: Nabatieh Governorate
- District: Nabatieh District
- Time zone: UTC+2 (EET)
  - Summer (DST): +3

Harouf (Arabic: حاروف, romanized: Ḥārūf) is a municipality in the Nabatieh Governorate region of southern Lebanon and is located north of the Litani River. The village is economically important due to the presence of a famous industrial area in it known as "Marj Harouf".

== History ==
In the 1596 tax records, it was named as a village in the Ottoman nahiya (subdistrict) of Sagif under the liwa' (district) of Safad, with a population of 12 households, all Muslim. The villagers paid a fixed tax-rate of 25% on agricultural products, such as wheat, barley, fruit trees, goats and beehives, in addition to "occasional revenues"; a total of 2,459 akçe.

In 1875, Victor Guérin found Harouf to be a village of about 140 Metualis. He further noted several sarcophagi, convincing him that it was an ancient place.

During the 2024 Lebanon war, Israel destroyed a vernacular house, more than 150 years old.

== Demographics ==
In 2014, Muslims made up 99.58% of registered voters in Harouf. 98.51% of the voters were Shiite Muslims.

== Bibliography ==
- Guérin, V. (1880). Description Géographique Historique et Archéologique de la Palestine (in French). Vol. 3: Galilee, pt. 2. Paris: L'Imprimerie Nationale.
- Hütteroth, W.-D.; Abdulfattah, K. (1977). Historical Geography of Palestine, Transjordan and Southern Syria in the Late 16th Century. Erlanger Geographische Arbeiten, Sonderband 5. Erlangen, Germany: Vorstand der Fränkischen Geographischen Gesellschaft. ISBN 3-920405-41-2.
- Rhode, H. (1979). Administration and Population of the Sancak of Safed in the Sixteenth Century (PhD). Columbia University. Archived from the original on 2019-04-20.
