= Arabic poetry =

Form of poetry

Arabic poetry (Arabic: الشعر العربي ash-shi‘r al-‘arabīyy) is one of the earliest forms of Arabic literature. Pre-Islamic Arabic poetry contains the bulk of the oldest poetic material in Arabic, but Old Arabic inscriptions reveal the art of poetry existed in Arabic writing in material as early as the 1st century BCE, with oral poetry likely being much older still.

Arabic poetry is categorized into two main types, rhymed or measured, and prose, with the former greatly preceding the latter. The rhymed poetry falls within fifteen different meters collected and explained by al-Farahidi in The Science of ‘Arud. Al-Akhfash, a student of al-Farahidi, later added one more meter to make them sixteen. The meters of the rhythmical poetry are known in Arabic as "seas" (buḥūr). The measuring unit of seas is known as "taf‘īlah," and every sea contains a certain number of taf'ilas which the poet has to observe in every verse (bayt) of the poem. The measuring procedure of a poem is very rigorous. Sometimes adding or removing a consonant or a vowel can shift the bayt from one meter to another. Also, in rhymed poetry, every bayt has to end with the same rhyme (qāfiyah) throughout the poem.

Al-Khalīl ibn ʿAḥmad al-Farāhīdī (711–786 CE) was the first Arab scholar to subject the prosody of Arabic poetry to a detailed phonological study. He failed to produce a coherent, integrated theory which satisfies the requirements of generality, adequacy, and simplicity; instead, he merely listed and categorized the primary data, thus producing a meticulously detailed but incredibly complex formulation which very few indeed are able to master and utilize.

Researchers and critics of Arabic poetry usually classify it in two categories: classical and modern poetry. Classical poetry was written before the Arabic renaissance (An-Nahḍah). Thus, all poetry that was written in the classical style is called "classical" or "traditional poetry" since it follows the traditional style and structure. It is also known as "vertical poetry" in reference to its vertical parallel structure of its two parts. Modern poetry, on the other hand, deviated from classical poetry in its content, style, structure, rhyme and topics.

== Pre-Islamic poetry ==
One of the first major poets in the pre-Islamic era is Imru' al-Qais, the last king of the kingdom of Kinda. Although most of the poetry of that era was not preserved, what remains is well regarded as among the finest Arabic poetry to date. In addition to the eloquence and artistic value, pre-Islamic poetry constitutes a major source for classical Arabic language both in grammar and vocabulary, and as a reliable historical record of the political and cultural life of the time.

Poetry held an important position in pre-Islamic society with the poet or sha'ir filling the role of historian, soothsayer and propagandist. Words in praise of the tribe (qit'ah) and lampoons denigrating other tribes (hija') seem to have been some of the most popular forms of early poetry. The sha'ir represented an individual tribe's prestige and importance in the Arabian Peninsula, and mock battles in poetry or zajal would stand in lieu of real wars. 'Ukaz, a market town not far from Mecca, would play host to a regular poetry festival where the craft of the sha'irs would be exhibited.

Alongside the sha'ir, and often as his poetic apprentice, was the rawi or reciter. The job of the rawi was to learn the poems by heart and to recite them with explanations and probably often with embellishments. This tradition allowed the transmission of these poetic works and the practice was later adopted by the huffaz for their memorisation of the Qur'an. At some periods there have been unbroken chains of illustrious poets, each one training a rawi as a bard to promote his verse, and then to take over from them and continue the poetic tradition. For example, Tufayl trained 'Awas ibn Hajar, 'Awas trained Zuhayr, Zuhayr trained his son Ka`b, Ka`b trained al-Hutay'ah, al-Hutay'ah trained Jamil Buthaynah and Jamil trained Kuthayyir `Azza.

Among the most famous poets of the pre-Islamic era are Imru' al-Qais, Samaw'al ibn 'Adiya, al-Nabigha, Tarafa, Zuhayr bin Abi Sulma, and Antarah ibn Shaddad. Other poets, such as Ta'abbata Sharran, al-Shanfara, Urwa ibn al-Ward, were known as su'luk or vagabond poets, much of whose works consisted of attacks on the rigidity of tribal life and praise of solitude. Some of these attacks on the values of the clan and of the tribe were meant to be ironic, teasing the listeners only in order finally to endorse all that the members of the audience held most dear about their communal values and way of life. While such poets were identified closely with their own tribes, others, such as al-A'sha, were known for their wanderings in search of work from whoever needed poetry.

Some of the most reputable collections of these poems included the Mu'allaqat (meaning "the hung poems", because they are traditionally thought to have been hung on or in the Kaaba) and the Mufaddaliyat (meaning "al-Mufaddal's examination" or "anthology"). The Mu'allaqat aimed to be the definitive source of the era's output with only a single example of the work of each of the so-called "seven renowned ones," although different versions differ in which "renowned ones" they chose. The Mufaddaliyat on the other hand contains a random collection of poetic material.

There are several characteristics that distinguish pre-Islamic poetry from the poetry of later times. One of these characteristics is that in pre-Islamic poetry more attention was given to the eloquence and the wording of the verse than to the poem as whole. This resulted in poems characterized by strong vocabulary and short ideas but with loosely connected verses. A second characteristic is the romantic or nostalgic prelude with which pre-Islamic poems would often start. In these preludes, a thematic unit called "nasib," the poet would remember his beloved and her deserted home and its ruins. This concept in Arabic poetry is referred to as "al-woqouf `ala al-atlal" (الوقوف على الأطلال / standing by the ruins) because the poet would often start his poem by saying that he stood at the ruins of his beloved; it is a kind of ubi sunt.

== Islamic poetry ==
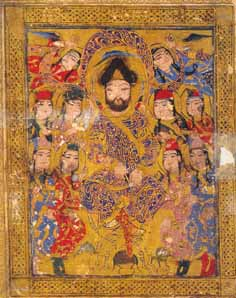
Illustration from Kitab al-Aghani (Book of Songs), 1216–20, by Abu al-Faraj al-Isfahani, a collection of songs by famous musicians and Arab poets.

It was the early poems' importance to Islamic scholarship which led to their preservation. Not only did the poems illuminate life in the early years of Islam and its antecedents but they would also prove the basis for the study of linguistics of which the Qur'an was regarded as the pinnacle. Many of the pre-Islamic forms of verse were retained and improved upon. Naqa'id or flytings, where two poets exchange creative insults, were popular with al-Farazdaq and Jarir swapping a great deal of invective. The tradition continued in a slightly modified form as zajal, in which two groups 'joust' in verse, and remains a common style in Lebanon.

Arabic Andalusi poetry in al-Andalus, or Islamic Iberia (Islamic Spain), involved figures such as Ibn Abd Rabbih (the author of the Al-ʿIqd al-Farīd), Ziryab, Ibn Zaydun, Wallada bint al-Mustakfi, Al-Mu'tamid ibn Abbad, Hafsa bint al-Hajj al-Rukuniyya, Ibn Tufail, Ibn Arabi, Ibn Quzman, Abu al-Baqa ar-Rundi, and Ibn al-Khatib.

The rise of poetry in Al-Andalus occurred in dialogue with the golden age of Jewish culture in Spain. Most Jewish writers in al-Andalus—while incorporating elements such as rhyme, meter, and themes of classical Arabic poetry—created poetry in Hebrew, but Samuel ibn Naghrillah, Joseph ibn Naghrela, and Ibn Sahl al-Isra'ili wrote poetry in Arabic.

Arabic poetry declined after the 13th century along with much of the literature due to the rise of Persian and Turkish literature. Andalusi literature flowered for a little longer, but ended with the expulsion of the Arabs in 1492. The corpus suffered large-scale destruction by fire in 1499 when Cardinal Jimenez de Cisneros made a public auto-da-fé in Granada, burning 1,025,000 Arabic volumes.

=== Court poets ===
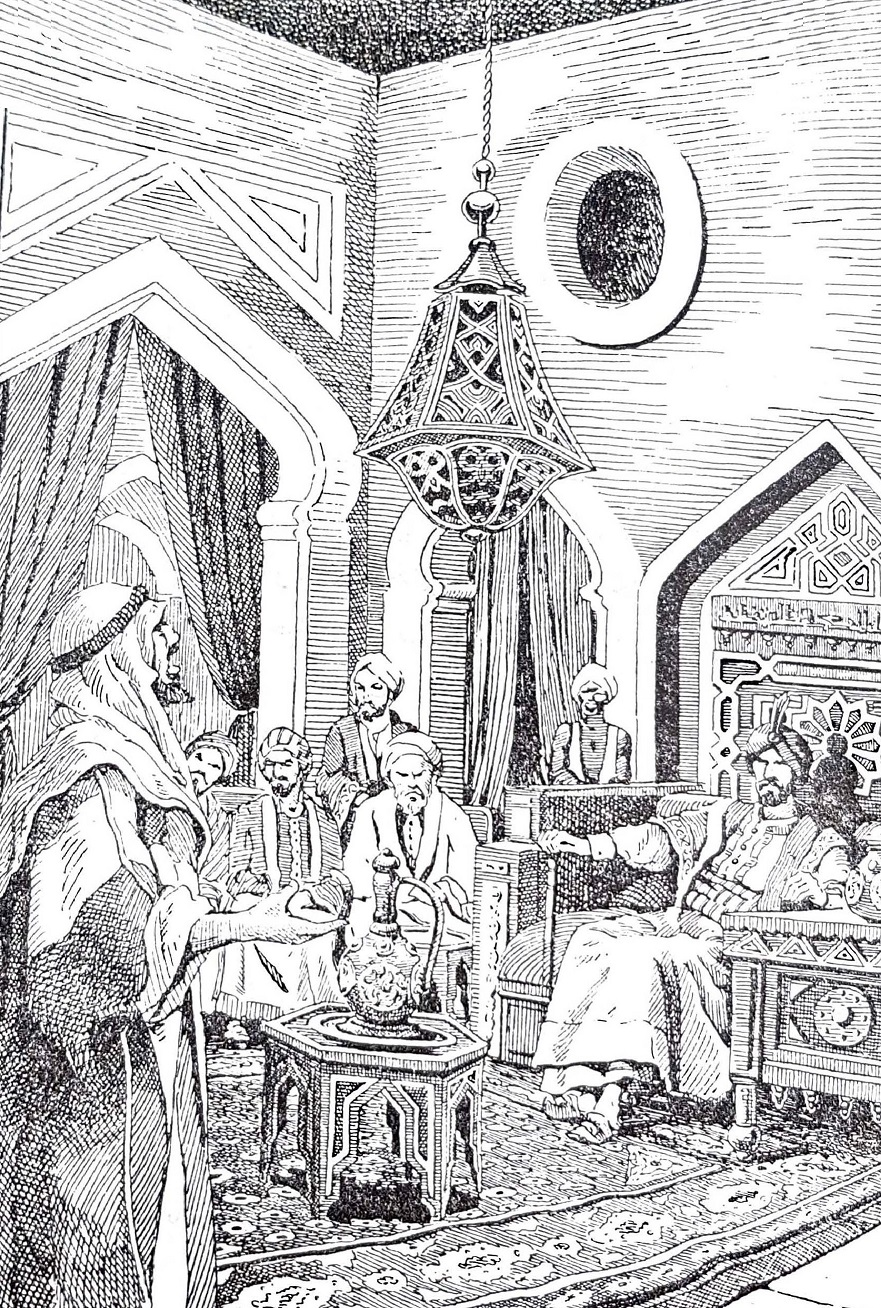
Abbasid caliph Al-Ma'mun (r. 813–833) listens to a poet

Ghaylan ibn 'Uqbah (c. 696 – c. 735), nicknamed Dhu ar-Rumma, is usually regarded as the last of the Pre-Islamic poets. His works had continued the themes and style of the pre-Islamic poets particularly eulogising the harsh but simple desert life, traditionally recited round a campfire. Although such themes continued and were returned to by many modern, urban poets, this poetic life was giving way to court poets. The more settled, comfortable and luxurious life in Umayyad courts led to a greater emphasis on the ghazal or love poem. Chief amongst this new breed of poet was Abu Nuwas. Not only did Abu Nuwas spoof the traditional poetic form of the qasida and write many poems in praise of wine, his main occupation was the writing of ever more ribald ghazal many of them openly homosexual.

While Nuwas produced risqué but beautiful poems, many of which pushed to the limit what was acceptable under Islam, others produced more religiously themed poetry. It is said that Nuwas struck a bargain with his contemporary Abu al-Alahijah: Abu Nuwas would concentrate on wine and love poems whilst al-Alahijah would write homilies. These homilies expressed views on religion, sin and the afterlife, but occasionally strayed into unorthodox territory. While the work of al-Alahijah was acceptable, others such as the poet Salih ibn 'Abd al-Quddus were executed for heresy. Waddah al-Yaman, now the national poet of Yemen, was also executed for his verse, but this was probably due to his over-familiarity with the wife of the caliph Al-Walid I.

Court poets were joined with court singers who simply performed works included Ibrahim al-Mawsili, his son Ishaq al-Mawsili and Ibrahim ibn al-Mahdi son of caliph al-Mahdi. Many stories about these early singers were retold in the Kitab al-Aghani or Book of Songs by Abu al-Faraj al-Isfahani.

The Sufi tradition also produced poetry closely linked to religion. Sufism is a mystical interpretation of Islam and it emphasised the allegorical nature of language and writing. Many of the works of Sufi poets appear to be simple ghazal or khamriyyah. Under the guise of the love or wine poem they would contemplate the mortal flesh and attempt to achieve transcendence. Rabia al-Adawiyya, Abd Yazid al-Bistami and Mansur al-Hallaj are some of the most significant Sufi poets, but the poetry and doctrine of al-Hallaj was eventually considered heretic for saying "I am the Truth," which came to be compared as literal incarnation. Al Hallaj was crucified and later became known as a Martyr.

The caliph himself could take on the role of court poet with al-Walid II a notable example, but he was widely disliked for his immorality and was deposed after only a year.

=== Badi' poetry ===
An important doctrine of Arabic poetry from the start was its complexity, but during the period of court poetry this became an art form in itself known as badi`. There were features such as metaphor, pun, juxtaposing opposites and tricky theological allusions. Bashshar ibn Burd was instrumental in developing these complexities which later poets felt they had to surpass. Although not all writers enjoyed the baroque style, with argumentative letters on the matter being sent by Ibn Burd and Ibn Miskawayh, the poetic brinkmanship of badi led to a certain formality in poetic art, with only the greatest poets' words shining through the complex structures and wordplay. This can make Arabic poetry even more difficult to translate than poetry from other languages, with much of a poet's skill often lost in translation.

== Christian poetry ==
Already before the arrival of Islam, Arab Christians composed poetry with biblical or Christian topics, such as Adi ibn Zayd who wrote poetry on the creation narrative and other biblical or Christian motives. According to the church historian Sozomen, odes composed in Arabic celebrating the victory of queen Mavia over emperor Valens may not only be the earliest account of oral Christian poetry but also the earliest account of Arabic poetry in general.

Under Islamic rule, though forced to live with certain restrictions, Arab Christians such as Al-Akhtal al-Taghlibi or Ibn al-Tilmidh continued to use Arabic for their poetry. However, these poets seldom addressed their personal Christian faith in their works.

Other ethnicities under Arab rule adapted Arabic poetry over the coming centuries. In ninth century Spain, Paulus Alvarus complained that Christian youths preferred Arabic poetry to Latin works. Hafs ibn Albar, who has been sometimes identified as Paulus' son, translated the psalms into Arabic in rhyme form, using rajaz verses as it resembled the metre used by Christians in the iambic verse. The translation and many other works enjoyed great popularity not only among Christians but also among Islamic and Jewish authors in Spain.

Arabic poetry was also used for apologetics. As such, the eleventh century Andalusi abu 'qasim ibn Al-Hayyat, originally a Muslim theologian, wrote a poem in defence of his conversion to Christianity.

The early eleventh-century bishop Sulayman al-Ghazzi holds a unique place in the history of Arab Christian literature as author of the first diwan of Christian religious poetry in Arabic. The collection consists of over 3,000 lines loosely structured in 97 qaṣīdas which deal with biblical, theological, ascetical, and personal themes such as the persecution Palestinian Christians suffered under caliph al-Hakim.

== Poetic genres ==
=== Romantic poetry ===
Another medieval Arabic love story was Hadith Bayad wa Riyad (The Story of Bayad and Riyad), a 13th-century Arabic love story written in al-Andalus. The main characters of the tale are Bayad, a merchant's son and a foreigner from Damascus, and Riyad, a well-educated girl in the court of an unnamed Hajib of al-Andalus (vizier or minister), whose equally unnamed daughter, whose retinue includes Riyad, is referred to as the Lady. The Hadith Bayad wa Riyad manuscript is believed to be the only illustrated manuscript known to have survived from more than eight centuries of Muslim and Arab presence in Spain.

There were several elements of courtly love which were developed in Arabic poetry, namely the notions of "love for love's sake" and "exaltation of the beloved lady" which have been traced back to Arabic literature of the 9th and 10th centuries. The notion of the "ennobling power" of love was developed in the early 11th century by the Persian psychologist and philosopher, Ibn Sina (known as "Avicenna" in English), in his Arabic treatise Risala fi'l-Ishq (Treatise on Love). The final element of courtly love, the concept of "love as desire never to be fulfilled," was also at times implicit in Arabic poetry.

The 10th century Encyclopedia of the Brethren of Purity features a fictional anecdote of a "prince who strays from his palace during his wedding feast and, drunk, spends the night in a cemetery, confusing a corpse with his bride. The story is used as a gnostic parable of the soul's pre-existence and return from its terrestrial sojourn."

Many of the tales in the One Thousand and One Nights are also love stories or involve romantic love as a central theme, including the frame story of Scheherazade, and many of the stories she narrates, such as "Aladdin," "Ali Baba," "The Ebony Horse" and "The Three Apples."

=== Satirical poetry ===
The genre of Arabic satirical poetry was known as hija. Biting satirical poetry was dreaded for its power to immortalize its subjects in insulting ways, and could include sexual, scatological, and religiously profane material. The only way to recover from a satirical insult delivered in poetry was to respond in kind, which meant naqa'id, or satirical duels involving exchanges of poems, were a distinctive part of early Arabic poetry.

In a tribal context, hija was often used to mock the poet's enemies or the virtue of rival tribes. Court poets like Abu Nuwas also employed satire, lampooning political figures like the vizier Ja'far ibn Yahya. After leaving Egypt, al-Mutanabbi mocked the eunuch ruler Abu al-Misk Kafur with a satirical poem: "Till I met this eunuch, I always assumed that the head was the seat of wisdom, but when I looked into his intelligence, I discovered that all his wisdom resided in his testicles."

In the 10th century, the writer al-Tha'alibi recorded satirical poetry written by the poets as-Salami and Abu Dulaf, with as-Salami praising Abu Dulaf's wide breadth of knowledge and then mocking his ability in all these subjects, and with Abu Dulaf responding back and satirizing as-Salami in return. Another 10th-century poet, Jarir ibn Atiyah, satirized Farazdaq by using the term "Farazdaq-like" to describe an individual who was a "transgressor of the Shari'a". Abu Nuwas, in the 9th century, once responded to an insult from Hashim bin Hudayj, a philosopher, by composing verses sarcastically praising his wisdom, then imploring him to use his knowledge to explain how the penis functions.

=== Poetic themes ===
- Madih, a eulogy or panegyric
- Hija, a lampoon or insult poem
- Rithā', an elegy
- Wasf, a descriptive poem
- Ghazal, a love poem, sometimes expressing love of men
- Khamriyyah, wine poetry
- Tardiyyah, hunt poetry
- Khawal, homiletic poetry
- Fakhr, boasting
- Hamasah, war poetry

=== Poetic forms ===
Poetry in Arabic is traditionally grouped in a diwan or collection of poems. These can be arranged by poet, tribe, topic or the name of the compiler such as the Asma'iyyat of al-Asma'i. Most poems did not have titles and they were usually named from their first lines. Sometimes they were arranged alphabetically by their rhymes. The role of the poet in Arabic developed in a similar way to poets elsewhere. The safe and easy patronage in royal courts was no longer available but a successful poet such as Nizar Qabbani was able to set up his own publishing house.

A large proportion of all Arabic poetry is written using the monorhyme, Qasidah. This is simply the same rhyme used on every line of a poem. While this may seem a poor rhyme scheme for people used to western literature it makes sense in a language like Arabic which has only three vowels which can be either long or short.

==== Mu'rabbah, literary Arabic ====
- Qarid
  - Qit'ah, an elegy or short poem about an event
  - Qasidah, an ode, designed to convey a message. A longer version of qit'ah
- Muwashshah, meaning "girdled," courtly love poetry
- Ruba'i or dubayt, a quatrain
- Rajaz, a discourse in rhyme, used to push the limits of lexicography

==== Malhunah, vernacular poetry ====
- Kan ya ma kan, meaning "once upon a time"
- Quma
- Zajal, meaning "shout"
- Hosa, folk poetry and ritual dance
- Mawwal or Mawaliya, folk poetry in four rhyming lines
- Nabati, the vernacular poetry of the tribes of the Arabian Peninsula and the Syrian Desert.
- Humayni, the vernacular poetry of Yemen.

=== Poetry theory and analysis ===
Literary criticism in Arabic literature often focused on religious texts, and the several long religious traditions of hermeneutics and textual exegesis have had a profound influence on the study of secular texts. This was particularly the case for the literary traditions of Islamic literature.

Poetry analysis was also employed in other forms of medieval Arabic poetry from the 9th century, notably, for the first time, by the Kufan grammarian Tha'lab (d. 904) in his collection of terms with examples Qawa'id al-shi'r (The Foundations of Poetry), by Qudama ibn Ja'far in the Naqd al-shi'r (Poetic Criticism), by al-Jahiz in the al-Bayan wa-'l-tabyin and al-Hayawan, and by Abdullah ibn al-Mu'tazz in his Kitab al-Badi. There were four critic groupings: experts on ancient poetry, critics of new Arabic poets, Quranic scholars, and Aristotelian logicians.

== Modern poetry ==
Mention no longer the driver on his night journey and the wide striding camels, and give up talk of morning dew and ruins.
I no longer have any taste for love songs on dwellings which already went down in seas of [too many] odes.
So, too, the ghada, whose fire, fanned by the sighs of those enamored of it, cries out to the poets: "Alas for my burning!"
If a steamer leaves with my friends on sea or land, why should I direct my complaints to the camels?

— Excerpt from Francis Marrash's Mashhad al-ahwal (1870), translated by Shmuel Moreh.

=== Arab Renaissance ===
Beginning in the 19th century, as part of what is now called the "Arab Revival" (an-Nahda) or "Arab Renaissance," some primarily Egyptian, Lebanese and Syrian writers and poets Rifa'a at-Tahtawi, Ahmad Faris al-Shidyaq, Butrus al-Bustani, and Francis Marrash believed that writing must be renewed towards modern style and themes. The blind poet Francis Marrash wrote in poetic prose and prose poetry and can be considered the first modern Arabic writer. Within and after the Arabic Renaissance appeared several poetry movements and groups.

=== Neoclassicism ===
The "Neoclassical" movement (different from the western neoclassicism) advocated return to the purity of classical Arabic poetry and began in the turn of the 20th century to explore the possibility of developing the classical poetic forms. Some of these neoclassical poets were acquainted with western literature but mostly continued to write in classical forms. One of the first proponents of this was the Egyptian poet and statesman Mahmoud Sami el-Baroudi. Other notable figures include Ahmad Shawqi (the most popular of them) and Hafiz Ibrahim from Egypt, Jamil Sidqi al-Zahawi and Maruf al-Rusafi from Iraq, and the Palestinian Ibrahim Tuqan. All this poets actively contributed to the anticolonial poetry likening European colonial powers to the Crusaders and calling for new Saladin to expel them from the Middle East.

A common genre in much of the neoclassical poetry was the use of the qasida, as well as ghazal or love poem in praise of the poet's homeland. This was manifested either as a nationalism for the newly emerging nation states of the region or in a wider sense as an Arab nationalism emphasising the unity of all Arab people. The poems of praise (madih), and the lampoon (hija) also returned. Ahmad Shawqi produced several works praising the reforming Turkish leader Kemal Atatürk, but when Atatürk abolished the caliphate, Shawqi was not slow in attacking him in verse. Political views in poetry were often more unwelcome in the 20th century than they had been in the 7th, and several poets faced censorship or, in the case of Abd al-Wahhab al-Bayyati, exile.

=== Romanticism ===
Poetry is the mirror of feeling, it stands above sophistry and delusion.

— Ahmed Zaki Abu Shadi

The "Romanticism" (partly coincident with western neo-romanticism) was another Arab literary movement from the early 20th century, floureshed during the 1930s–1940s, that sought inspiration from French or English romantic poetry. Romantic poets, denouncing blind imitation of one-rhyme system in classical poetry and its recurring themes, imaged individual experiences via powerful love ghazal and other genres. The precursor to this style became the Lebanese-Egyptian poet and journalist Khalil Mutran, more in his critical works.

Most famous part of Arab Romanticism or outstand movement related to it is the Mahjar ("émigré" school) that includes Arabic-language poets in the Americas Ameen Rihani, Kahlil Gibran, Nasib Arida, Mikhail Naimy, Elia Abu Madi, Fawsi Maluf, Farhat, and al-Qarawi. As their style example:

Give me the fluite and sing! Forget all
that you and I have said
Talk is but dust in the air, so tell me of
your deeds.

— Kahlil Gibran

The romantic movement also involved poets in every Arabian country: Abdel Rahman Shokry, Abbas Mahmoud al-Aqqad and Ibrahim al-Mazini in Egypt, Omar Abu Risha in Syria, Elias Abu Shabaki and Salah Labaki in Lebanon, Abu al-Qasim al-Shabbi in Tunisia, and Al-Tijani Yusuf Bashir in Sudan.

Besides them, in Cairo in 1932, Ahmed Zaki Abu Shadi formed the literary "Apollo Society" with the magazine Apollo, that members were also Ibrahim Nagi, Ali Mahmoud Taha, and mentioned Abu al-Qasim al-Shabbi. This grouping absorbed some elements of literary modernism and avant-garde.

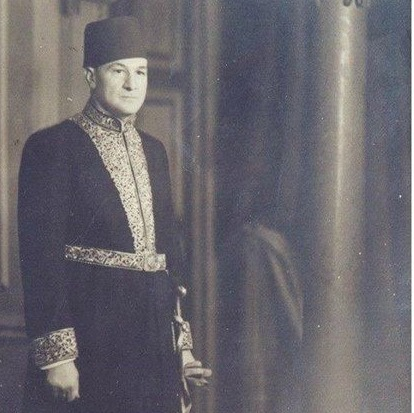
Aziz Pasha Abaza, poet from the aristocratic literary Egyptian family the House of Abaza of Circassian Abazin origin

An example of modern poetry in classical Arabic style with themes of Pan-Arabism is the work of Aziz Pasha Abaza. He came from Abaza family which produced notable Arabic literary figures including Ismail Pasha Abaza, Fekry Pasha Abaza, novelist Tharwat Abaza, and Desouky Bek Abaza, among others.

=== Symbolism ===
The Symbolist school of poetry, close to Romanticism, was represented in the Arab world by the Lebanese poets Adib Mashar (1889–1928), Yusuf Ghusub (b. 1900) and Said Akl, and also Bishr Faris in Egypt. Ghusub with Akl, both, preached the use of Latin script. The mentioned above Romantic poet Salah Labaki was associated with them, aspecially in his critic works on the French literary theory.

=== Modernism and avant-garde ===
The development of modernist poetry also influenced poetry in Arabic. After World War II, there was a largely unsuccessful modernist movement by several poets to write poems in free verse (shi'r hurr). Thus, in 1947 the two Iraqi poets, Badr Shakir al-Sayyab and Nazik al-Malaika initiated a break in the stanza form (bayt) for free verse. The closer the Arab poets approached to Western poetry, the more anxious they became to look for new media, themes, techniques, metaphors and forms to liberate themselves from conventional poetry.

More recently, poets such as Jabra Ibrahim Jabra, Muhammad al-Maghut and Tawfiq Sayigh (d. 1971) have pushed the boundaries of stylistic experimentation even further in favour of prose poetry (qasidat al-nathr).

Avantgardist type prose poetry already took place among some romantics, such as Abu al-Qasim al-Shabbi, but became the trend with Yusuf al-Khal and Adunis, who founded the magazine Shi'r ("Poetry") in Beirut in 1957 under the influence of al-Shabbi's style and the Apollo journal in whole. Another avantgardist literary magazine in Beirut was the long-lived Al Adab (1953). Adunis from 1968 published his own journal Mawakif for literary innovations as follows:

To a father who died, green as a cloud
with a sail on his face, I bow.

— Adunis, Homeland

=== Surrealism ===
Between the years 1938–1948, the Surrealist Cairo-based anti-fascist artistic Art et Liberté group was active, under the leadership of the poet Georges Henein. Shawqi's granddaughter, poet Ikbal El-Alailly, was also a member. The work of these authors did not have a direct effect on Arabic poetry, because they wrote poems in European languages.

Arabic language Surrealist experiments proper belong to Orkhan Muyassar (1911?–1965) and Adunis in some his works.

=== Contemporary poetry ===
Poetry as a part of contemporary literature retains a very important status in the Arab world. Besides that, poets of "commitment" (iltizam), among them Abd al-Wahhab Al-Bayati, Khalil Hawi, and Mahmoud Darwish, played an important role in politics of the Arabian people along with an establishment of national states, revolutions, and the 1967 Six-Day War.

Iraqi poet Abd al-Wahhab Al-Bayati faced exile, due to his revolutionary ideas and advocacy for oppressed people, as in the following poem:

Why are we Lord?
Without a country, without love
We die
We die in terror
Why are we in exile?
Why are we lord?

— Abd al-Wahhab Al-Bayati, Why Are We in Exile the Refugees Ask

Mahmoud Darwish was regarded as the Palestinian national poet, and his funeral was attended by thousands of mourners. And here is an instance of political poetry of another Palestinian, Tawfiq Ziad:

In Lydda, in Ramla, in the Galilee,
we shall remain
like a wall upon your chest, and in your throat
like a shard of glass
a cactus thorn,
and in your eyes
a sandstorm.

— Tawfiq Ziad, Here We Will Stay

The most widely read in the contemporary Middle East, Syrian poet Nizar Qabbani wrote during the 1950s and 1960s on social protest and politics, and even addressed less political themes in favour love poetry, but was regarded as a cultural icon and his poems provide the lyrics for many popular songs.

From the 1970s, there is a neo-Sufi trend within Arab poets, including some far left-wing figures.

Reality television poetry competitions like Prince of Poets and Million's Poet exist to promote classical Arabic poetry and Nabati poetry respectively. Notable contestants in these competitions include Tamim al-Barghouti, Hissa Hilal, and Hisham al-Gakh.

== See also ==
- List of Arabic-language poets
- Arabic literature
- Arabic music

== Sources ==
- Allen, Roger (2005) [1998]. The Arabic Literary Heritage: The Development of its Genres and Criticism. New York: Cambridge University Press. ISBN 0-521-48525-8.
- Allen, Roger M. A. (2000). An Introduction to Arabic Literature. New York: Cambridge University Press. ISBN 9780521776578.
- Allen, R.M.A. (2012). "Arabic poetry". In Greene, Roland; et al. (eds.). The Princeton Encyclopedia of Poetry and Poetics (4th rev. ed.). Princeton, NJ: Princeton University Press. pp. 65–72. ISBN 978-0-691-15491-6.
- Badawi, M. M. (1975). A Critical Introduction to Modern Arabic Poetry. Cambridge: Cambridge University Press. ISBN 0-521-20699-5.
- Borg, Gert; Moor, Ed de, eds. (2001). Representations of the divine in Arabic poetry. Leiden: Rodopi. ISBN 978-90-420-1574-6.
- Bosworth, Clifford Edmund (1976). The Mediaeval Islamic Underworld: the Banu Sasan in Arabic Society and Literature. Leiden: E. J. Brill. ISBN 90-04-04392-6.
- Boullata, Issa J. (July 1970). "Badr Shakir al-Sayyab and the Free Verse Movement". International Journal of Middle East Studies. 1 (3). Cambridge University Press: 248–258. doi:10.1017/S0020743800024193. JSTOR 162330. S2CID 162731001.
- Butt, Aviva (2012). "Adonis, Mysticism and the Neo-Sufi Trend". Poets From a War Torn World: A Critical Analysis of Modern Hebrew and Arabic Poetry (e-Book). Strategic Book Publishing and Rights. ISBN 978-16-1-204-472-9.
- Creswell, Robyn (2019). City of Beginnings. Poetic Modernism in Beirut. Princeton, NJ: Princeton University Press. ISBN 9780691185149.
- Gelder, G. J. H. van (1982). Beyond the Line: Classical Arabic Literary Critics on the Coherence and Unity of the Poem. Leiden: E. J. Brill. ISBN 90-04-06854-6.
- Ghanim, Honaida (March 2009). "Poetics of Disaster: Nationalism, Gender, and Social Change Among Palestinian Poets in Israel After Nakba". International Journal of Politics, Culture, and Society. 22 (1): 23–39. doi:10.1007/s10767-009-9049-9. JSTOR 40608203. S2CID 144148068.
- Grunebaum, G. E. von (1952). "Avicenna's Risâla fî 'l-'išq and Courtly Love", Journal of Near Eastern Studies.
- Hamori, Andras (1971). "An Allegory from the Arabian Nights: the City of Brass", Bulletin of the School of Oriental and African Studies. Cambridge University Press.
- Heinrichs, W. P.; Allen, R.M.A. (2012). "Arabic poetics". In Greene, Roland; et al. (eds.). The Princeton Encyclopedia of Poetry and Poetics (4th rev. ed.). Princeton, NJ: Princeton University Press. pp. 62–65. ISBN 978-0-691-15491-6.
- Irwin, Robert (January 3, 2005). "An Arab Surrealist". The Nation: 23–38.
- Jayyusi, Salma Khadra (1977). Trends and Movements in Modern Arabic Poetry. Vol. 2. Leiden: E. J. Brill. ISBN 90-04-04920-7.
- Jayyusi, Salma Khadra (1992). "The Romantic Poets". In Badawi, Muhammad Mustafa (ed.). Modern Arabic Literature. Cambridge: Cambridge University Press. ISBN 978-0-521-33197-5.
- Kendall, Elisabeth (July 1997). "The Marginal Voice: Journals and the Avant-garde in Egypt". Journal of Islamic Studies. 8 (2): 216–238. doi:10.1093/jis/8.2.216.
- Kennedy, Philip F. (1997). The Wine Song in Classical Arabic Poetry: Abu Nuwas and the Literary Tradition. Oxford: Clarendon Press. ISBN 978-0198263920.
- Kennedy, Philip F. (2012). Abu Nuwas: a genius of poetry. London: Oneworld Publs. ebook.
- Koningsveld, P. Sj van (1994). "Christian Arabic literature from medieval Spain: An attempt at periodization". Christian Arabic Apologetics during the Abbasid Period (750-1258). Brill. pp. 203–224.
- Marzolph, Ulrich; van Leeuwen, Richard; Wassouf, Hassan (2004). The Arabian Nights Encyclopedia. Santa Barbara, Ca: ABC-Clio. ISBN 1-57607-204-5.
- Monroe, James T. (2004). Hispano-Arabic Poetry: a Student Anthology. Leiden: Gorgias Press. ISBN 1-59333-115-0.
- Moreh, Shmuel (1968a). "Free Verse "(Al-shi'r al-hurr)" in Modern Arabic Literature: Abū Shādī and His School, 1926–46". Bulletin of the School of Oriental and African Studies, University of London. 31 (1): 28–51. doi:10.1017/S0041977X00112777. ISSN 0041-977X. JSTOR 612002. S2CID 162582965.
- Moreh, Shmuel (July 1968b). "Poetry in Prose (al-Shi'r al-Manthūr) in Modern Arabic Literature". Middle Eastern studies. 4 (4): 330–360. doi:10.1080/00263206808700109. JSTOR 4282260.
- Moreh, S. (1976). Modern Arabic Poetry 1800–1970: The Development of its Forms and Themes under the Influence of Western Literature. Leiden: E. J. Brill. ISBN 90-04-04795-6.
- Moreh, Shmuel (1988). Studies in Modern Arabic Prose and Poetry. Leiden: E. J. Brill. ISBN 90-04-08359-6.
- Noble, Samuel (17 December 2010). "Sulayman al-Ghazzi". In Thomas, David; Mallett, Alexander (eds.). Christian-Muslim Relations. A Bibliographical History. Volume 2 (900-1050). BRILL. pp. 617–623. ISBN 978-90-04-21618-1.
- Noble, Samuel; Treiger, Alexander (15 March 2014). The Orthodox Church in the Arab World, 700–1700: An Anthology of Sources. Cornell University Press. pp. 160–163. ISBN 978-1-5017-5130-1.
- Somekh, Sasson (1992). "The Neo-classical Arabic poets". In Badawi, Muhammad Mustafa (ed.). Modern Arabic Literature. Cambridge: Cambridge University Press. pp. 36–82. ISBN 978-0-521-33197-5.
- Starkey, Paul (2006). Modern Arabic Literature. Edinburgh: Edinburgh University Press. ISBN 0-7486-1291-2.
- Stetkevych, Suzanne Pinckney (1993). The Mute Immortals Speak: Pre-Islamic Poetry and the Poetics of Ritual. Cornell University Press. ISBN 978-0801480461.
- Sulaiman, Khalid A. (1984). Palestine and Modern Arab Poetry. London: Zed. ISBN 978-0-86232-238-0.
- Tolan, John (25 November 2011). "Christian Reactions to Muslim Conquests". Dynamics in the History of Religions between Asia and Europe: Encounters, Notions, and Comparative Perspectives. BRILL. ISBN 978-90-04-22535-0.
- Toral-Niehoff, Isabel (2008). "Eine arabische poetische Gestaltung des Sündenfalls: Das vorislamische Schöpfungsgedicht des ʿAdî b. Zayd". In Hartwig, Dirk; Homolka, Walter; Marx, Michael J.; Neuwirth, Angelika (eds.). Im vollen Licht der Geschichte": Die Wissenschaft des Judentums und die Anfänge der kritischen Koranforschung (in German). Würzburg: Ergon. pp. 235–256. ISBN 978-3899134780.
- Wagner, Ewald (1987), Grundzüge der klassischen arabischen Dichtung. Darmstadt: Wissenschaftliche Buchgesellschaft. (in German)
