= Samir Elmesirri =

Egyptian artist (born 1941)

- Born: 1941 (age 83–84); Cairo, Egypt
- Education: Studied with Adham Wanly and Seif Wanly; Faculty of Commerce (degree, 1967)
- Known for: Member, Syndicate of Plastic Arts; 17 solo exhibitions (as of 2010)
- Style: Painting; Drawing
- Awards: Second place, Plastic Arts for Public Culture (1974) * First place, Alexandria's First Festival (1976)

Samir Elmissiri (born 1941) is an Egyptian artist. He was born in Cairo, Egypt, in 1941, and now lives in Alexandria. He is a member of the Syndicate of Plastic Arts. He has had 17 exhibitions as of May 2010. He received second place for the plastics arts for public culture in 1974, and got first place for Alexandrias' first festival in 1976.

In 1962, while studying in the faculty of commerce, he studied painting and drawing at the same time with Adham Wanly. Samir started his career as a painter as a protégé of Adham Wanly's brother Seif Wanly. At 1967 he finished his studies in both the university and the institute. Since that time he worked several jobs till he retired in 1998.
