= Ahmed Zaki Abu Shadi =

Egyptian poet and publisher

- أحمد زكي أبو شادي
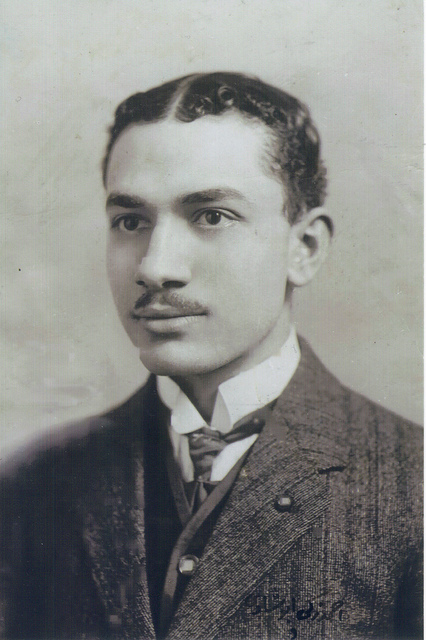
- Portrait of Abu Shadi as a young man, c. 1909
- Born: February 9, 1892; Cairo, Khedivate of Egypt
- Died: April 12, 1955 (aged 63); Washington, D.C., United States
- Other name: Ahmed Zaky Abushady
- Occupations: Poet, writer, beekeeper, doctor, publisher, translator
- Movement: Neo-romanticism, "Apollo Society"

Ahmed Zaki Abu Shadi (Note: Also transliterated as Ahmed Zaky Abushady.) (Arabic: أحمد زكي أبو شادي, ALA-LC: Aḥmad Zakī Abū Shādī; February 9, 1892 – April 12, 1955 in Cairo) was an Egyptian Romantic poet, publisher, medical doctor, bacteriologist and bee scientist.

== Family ==
Abu Shadi's father, Muhammed Abu Shadi Bey, was a renowned lawyer, President of the Bar's Union, and staunch Wafdist. His mother, Amina, was the sister of Egyptian poet Mostafa Naguib; she held literary salons in Cairo. Abu Shadi's first cousins were the Alexandrian painters Seif Wanly and Adham Wanly. Abu Shadi was a Wafdist like his father, a poet and publisher of experimental Arabic poetry, and a physician and scientist committed to fostering advances in science and agriculture. He was also a social reformer advocating women's suffrage, education for all and the elimination of poverty. Abu Shadi was educated in Egypt and in England, where he lived for ten years (1912-1922). In 1920 Abu Shadi married Anna Bamford of Stalybridge, a descendant of Samuel Bamford, the Lancashire poet, author and labor organizer. Abu Shadi saw himself as an ambassador of Anglo-Egyptian relations. He was a Muslim and a secular humanist. He promoted the Co-operative Movement in Britain and tried to implement its principles in Egypt.

== Apollo ==
Abu Shadi is best known in Egypt for having founded the influential poetry journal Apollo (1932–1934), an important vehicle for experimental Arabic poetry in Egypt and beyond, which he designed, published, and edited. He established a group of poets known as "Apollo's Society" or The Apollo School (Arabic: مدرسة أبولو) whose members and contributors included artists and poets from beyond Egypt's borders and across the Arab world; they included Ibrahim Nagi, ʾAli al-ʾInani, Kamil Kilani, Mahmud ʾImad, Mahmud Sadiq, Ahmad al-Shayib, the Egyptian calligrapher Sayed Ibrahim, the celebrated Tunisian poet Aboul-Qacem Echebbi (or Qasm al-Shabbi), 'Ali Mahmud Taha, Mahmud Abu'l-Wafa, Hasan al-Qayati, Hasan Kamil al-Sayrafi, Ramzy Maftah, and the Tunisian poet Salih Jawdat. The first president of Gamʾiyyat Apollo was Ahmed Shawqi; Khalil Mutran and Ahmad Muharram were vice presidents. When Shawqi died he was succeeded by Khalil Mutran as president.

== Modern Arabic literature ==
Abu Shadi wrote poetry, as well as essays on social reform, Islam, politics, and the arts. In addition to Apollo, he published the magazine Adabi ("My Literature") in Alexandria starting from 1939. He wrote articles of literary criticism, and lyric qasidas, stories, opera librettos and plays in verse. Anthologies of his poetry include: Dewdrops at Dawn (1910), Rays and Shadows (1931), and Visions of Spring (1933). His historical tales include: Ibn Zaydun in Prison (1925) and The Death of Imru al-Kaysa (1925). He translated Arabic poetry to English, including the ghazals of Hafiz, the Rubāiyāt of Omar Khayyam, and translated several tragedies of Shakespeare into Arabic.

== Beekeeping ==
Abu Shadi lived in England from 1912 to 1922. He studied medicine at the University of London and graduated with distinction in 1917. In 1919 he founded the Apis Club, an international organization of individual beekeepers and bee scientists in different countries, based at Port Hill House in Benson, Oxfordshire. Abu Shadi launched and edited the Apis Club periodical Bee World, 'an international monthly journal devoted to the progressive interests of modern bee culture', which was later edited by Annie D. Betts (1929–1949) and by Dr. Eva Crane (1950–1983). The Apis Club organized various international conferences in Europe, and the scientific content of the contributions and publications increased; these and the activities of the Apis Club were reported in Bee World. The Apis Club was eventually transitioned to the International Bee Research Association (IBRA). Its archives are currently held in the National Library of Wales. In 1919, Abu Shadi filed his first patent in Great Britain for a removable, standardized aluminum honeycomb; he filed four patents in total for improvements made to beekeeping apparatuses.

In January 1930, eight years after returning to Egypt, Abu Shadi established a bee husbandry organization called The Bee Kingdom League, which he operated out of his home in Alexandria. He launched, published and edited the bilingual English/Arabic monthly international journal, The Bee Kingdom. He organized the first International Bee Exposition, which took place in Cairo in November 1931; its proceedings are documented in the December 1931 issue of The Bee Kingdom journal.

== Life ==
In 1920, Abu Shadi married British national Annie Bamford, who was descended from the Lancashire poet and labor organizer Samuel Bamford. The Abu Shadi's left England and relocated to Egypt in 1922, where they raised a family: the eldest daughter Safeya, was named after Safeya Zaghloul the popular activist feminist and wife of Saad Zaghloul, the 19th-20th-century Egyptian revolutionary and statesman; a son, Amin Ramzy; and the youngest daughter, Hoda, named after the 19th-20th-century Egyptian feminist Huda Shaarawi. They lived in Cairo, Alexandria and Port Said, and eventually settled in Alexandria at 60 rue Menasce, near Wabour al-Mayah. After a long illness, Annie Abu Shadi died in January 1946. The family emigrated to the United States in April 1946. They lived in New York City, Springfield Gardens, Queens, and Washington, D.C. After settling in New York, Abu Shadi worked for the Voice of America producing radio broadcasts in Arabic. He was invited to write a short essay for This I Believe, a radio show hosted by Edward R. Murrow (1951–1955). He also edited newspapers and magazines of the local Arab community in New York, and was a professor of Arabic literature at the Asiatic Institute. Abu Shadi was remarried to Constance Wellman, an American who was previously married to the American painter John D. Graham (1936–1945), and Sheikh Khalili al-Rawaf, a Saudi businessman (1945–1948). Abu Shadi continued to actively contribute to local bee husbandry associations, giving lectures and demonstrations, and was a member of the Bronx Beekeepers Association. Abu Shadi suffered a stroke and died at his home in Washington, D.C., on April 12, 1955. His five grandchildren were born in or near New York City.

== Archive acquisition ==
In April 2020, NYU Abu Dhabi (NYUAD) Library acquired the Abu Shadi archive containing over 40 boxes of correspondence, unpublished manuscripts, and photographs, as well as paintings and artifacts.

A conference titled "Negotiating Self and Modernity: The Many Journeys of Ahmad Zaki Abu Shadi" was held at NYU Abu Dhabi, May 22-23, 2023 to celebrate the acquisition of the Abu Shadi archive.

== Memorials ==
- A street near his home in Alexandria, "Shâri Doctor Ahmed Zaki Abu Shadi" is named after him.
- An Egyptian postage stamp was issued in 1992 to honor his memory.
