= Wanly =

Wanly is an Egyptian surname. Notable people with the surname include:

- Adham Wanly (1908–1959), Egyptian painter
- Seif Wanly (1906–1979), Egyptian painter
