= Urwa ibn al-Ward =

'Urwa ibn al-Ward al-'Abasi (Arabic: عروة بن الورد; 520–600 CE) was a pre-Islamic Arabic su'luk poet. He was a member of the Banu Abs tribe.

Urwah Bin Al-ward is a heroic outlaw in Arabic folklore who, according to legend, was a highly skilled archer and swordsman. Ewrah bin Al-Ward Al-Absi – the noble ragamuffin – a brave knight, polite, out of law, a supporter of the poor, poet of Abs, Arabic knight and a generous ragamuffin. He was stealing to feed the poor, he was called “ragamuffin’s loop”, because he was collecting and direct them if they failed in their invasions. He had a remarkable skill in shooting arrows.

== Life ==
Little is known about his life, but he had a reputation for being "the most generous of the ancient Arabs."

== Poetry ==
Urwa was the most prolific of the su'luk poets. Yaqub Ibn as-Sikkit wrote a commentary on his poetic diwan. His most famous poem is preserved in the Asma'iyyat. Some of his poetry expresses his love for Salma, his estranged wife who he divorced while drunk. When he recovered, he fell into despair at what he had done. His diwan was edited by Theodor Nöldeke, who published it as Die Gedichte des Urwa ibn Alward in 1864.

== Cultural portrayals ==
Urwa ibn al-Ward has been portrayed in a number of plays, films, and television series in the Arab world. His association with the famous knight Antarah ibn Shaddad is because the two were from the same tribe, the Banu Abs.

- 1961: The film Antara ibn Shaddad, directed by Niazi Mostafa. The role of Urwa was played by Mohammad al-Hilu.
- 1978: The television series Urwa ibn al-Ward, directed by Salah Abu Hanud. The role of Urwa was played by Usama al-Mashini.
- 2007: The television series Antara ibn Shaddad, directed by Rami Hana. The role of Urwa was played by Mahyar Khudur.
- 2012: The play Antarah ibn Shaddad, presented at the Ukazz Theater in Ta'if.

== See also ==
- Ta'abbata Sharran
- Al-Shanfara
