= Wanley =

Wanley is a surname. Notable people with the surname include:

- Francis Wanley (1709–1791), Doctor of Divinity and Anglican priest
- Humfrey Wanley (1672–1726), English librarian, palaeographer and scholar of Old English
- John Samuel Wanley Sawbridge Erle-Drax (1800–1887), British Member of Parliament (MP) during the Victorian era
- Nathaniel Wanley (1634–1680), English clergyman and writer, known for The Wonders of the Little World
- Professor Richard Wanley, a character played by Edward G. Robinson in the 1944 Fritz Lang film The Woman in the Window

== See also ==
- Waley
- Wanly
- Swanley
