= Shi'r =

Poetry magazine in Lebanon (1957–1969)

- Categories: Poetry literary magazine
- Frequency: Quarterly; Monthly
- Founder: Yusuf al-Khal; Adunis; Unsi Al Hajj
- Founded: 1957
- First issue: January 1957
- Final issue: Autumn 1970
- Country: Lebanon
- Based in: Beirut
- Language: Arabic

Shi'r (Arabic: مجلة شعر, lit. 'Poetry') was an avant-garde and modernist monthly literary magazine with a special reference to poetry. The magazine was published in Beirut, Lebanon, between 1957 and 1970 with a three-year interruption. The founders were two leading literary figures: Yusuf al-Khal and Adunis. It was named after Harriet Monroe’s Chicago-based magazine, Poetry.

== History and profile ==
Shi'r was started in Beirut in 1957, and the first issue appeared in January. Its founders were Yusuf al-Khal, Adunis and Unsi Al Hajj. The magazine was significantly affected from Ahmed Zaki Abu Shadi's the Apollo Poet Society founded in Cairo, Egypt, in 1932. Salma Khadra Jayyusi argues that Shi'r is, in fact, the successor of Apollo which was the publication of this society. It was started as a quarterly, but later its frequency was switched to monthly.

The goal of Shi'r which was an avant-garde journal was to present a non-political version of poetry. This version of poetry is called Al Shi'r al Hurr (Arabic: Free Poetry) which refers to prose poetry. It also attempted to revive Arabic poetry and to reshape it away from formalism. The magazine adopted a modernist approach towards poetry. Its another aim was to encourage the Afro-Asian solidarity and nonalignment which had been stated in the Bandung Conference in 1955. The magazine organized poetry meetings each Thursday at the Plaza Hotel in Hamra Street. It frequently published translations of Vietnamese literary works.

Although both were avant-garde publications and supported free verse movement, Al Adab, a literary magazine established in Beirut in 1953, was the main adversary of Shi'r. Because the contributors of Shi'r opposed the movement of committed literature (al-adab al-multazim in Arabic), a dominant approach in the 1950s and 1960s in the Arab world which was also supported by Al Adab. The Al Adab contributors claimed that Shi'r had detrimental effects on the traditional heritage of Arabic literature.

Shi'r was banned in some countries due to its alleged support for the cultural war against Arab nationalism and its being funded by the CIA and French intelligence. It was temporarily shut down in 1964 and was restarted in Spring 1967. In the second phase al-Khal also served as the editor-in-chief of the magazine of which the scope was expanded to cover other literary subjects in addition to poetry. Shi'r ceased publication in Autumn 1970 after publishing forty-four issues.

== Editors and contributors ==
Al-Khal was the editor-in-chief of Shi'r. Adunis served in different positions: at the beginning he was the editor and from 1958 he began to function as the secretary of the editorial board. He became the managing editor in 1961 and co-owner and co-editor-in-chief of Shi'r in 1963. However, he left the magazine soon after these roles.

The contributors were part of the Shi'r school, and the magazine was an organ of this movement. They were also related to the Syrian Social Nationalist Party. The latter group included Adunis, Kamal Kheir Beik and Muhammad Maghut.

Sargon Boulus, an Iraq-born Assyrian poet, started his career in Shi'r in 1961. Fouad Refka, and Jabra Ibrahim Jabra were among the contributors of the magazine. Palestinian poet Tawfiq Sayigh also published a poem in the magazine in 1961.

=== Studies on Shi'r ===
Kamal Kheir Beik analyzed Shi'r in his PhD thesis which was completed at the University of Geneva in 1972. Another comprehensive study on Shi'r is a book by Dounia Badini published in 2009.
