= Ta'abbata Sharran =

Arab poet

- Born: Thabit ibn Jaber Al-Fahmi
- Occupations: Poet, brigand
- Era: Late 6th century or early 7th century CE
- Notable work: Qasida Qafiyya; Qasida Lamiyya

Thabit ibn Jaber, better known by his epithet Ta'abbata Sharran (Arabic: تأبط شرا, romanized: Ta'abbaṭa Sharrā; lived late 6th century or early 7th century CE) was a pre-Islamic Arabic poet and warrior of the su'luk (vagabond) school. He lived in the Arabian Peninsula near the city of Mecca, in the homeland of his Fahm tribe. He was known for raiding against surrounding tribes, the Banu Hudhayl to the north and Bajila to the south of his tribe terrain. He said poems about tribal warfare, desert mountain life, and ghouls. His legacy was prominent in the early poetic anthologies of Mecca, and later being preserved in both the Mufaddaliyat (8th century) and the Hamasah (9th century). Details of his life are known only from pseudo-historical accounts in the poetic anthologies and the Kitab al-Aghani.

== Name ==
His proper name was Thabit ibn Jabr al-Fahmi. Al-Fahmi is a nisba indicating his membership in the Fahm tribe. Ta'abatta Sharran is a laqab, or nickname, which means "he who had evil under his arm."

There are a number of traditional accounts of how he acquired the name, related in the Kitab al-Aghani. In one, he saw a ram in the desert. He picked it up and carried it under his arm, but it urinated on him. It became heavier as he approached his camp, so he dropped it, and saw that in fact it was a ghul. His clan asked him what he had been carrying, and he replied "the ghul," which prompted them to give him his nickname. In another, during truffle season, his mother asked why he was not gathering truffles for the family. He went out with her bag and filled it with snakes, then returned to the tent carrying the bag under his arm. He threw the bag down in front of her and she opened it, finding the snakes, then fled the tent. When she told the story to the women of the tribe, they gave Thabit his nickname. Another story has it that his mother gave him the name because he habitually carried his sword under his arm when travelling with a raiding party. Modern scholars believe that these traditions "should not be taken at face value," and that the name was intended to signify the poet's unavoidable propensity for trouble.

== Life ==
Map of pre-Islamic Arabia, showing the location of Ta'if and territories of the principal tribes

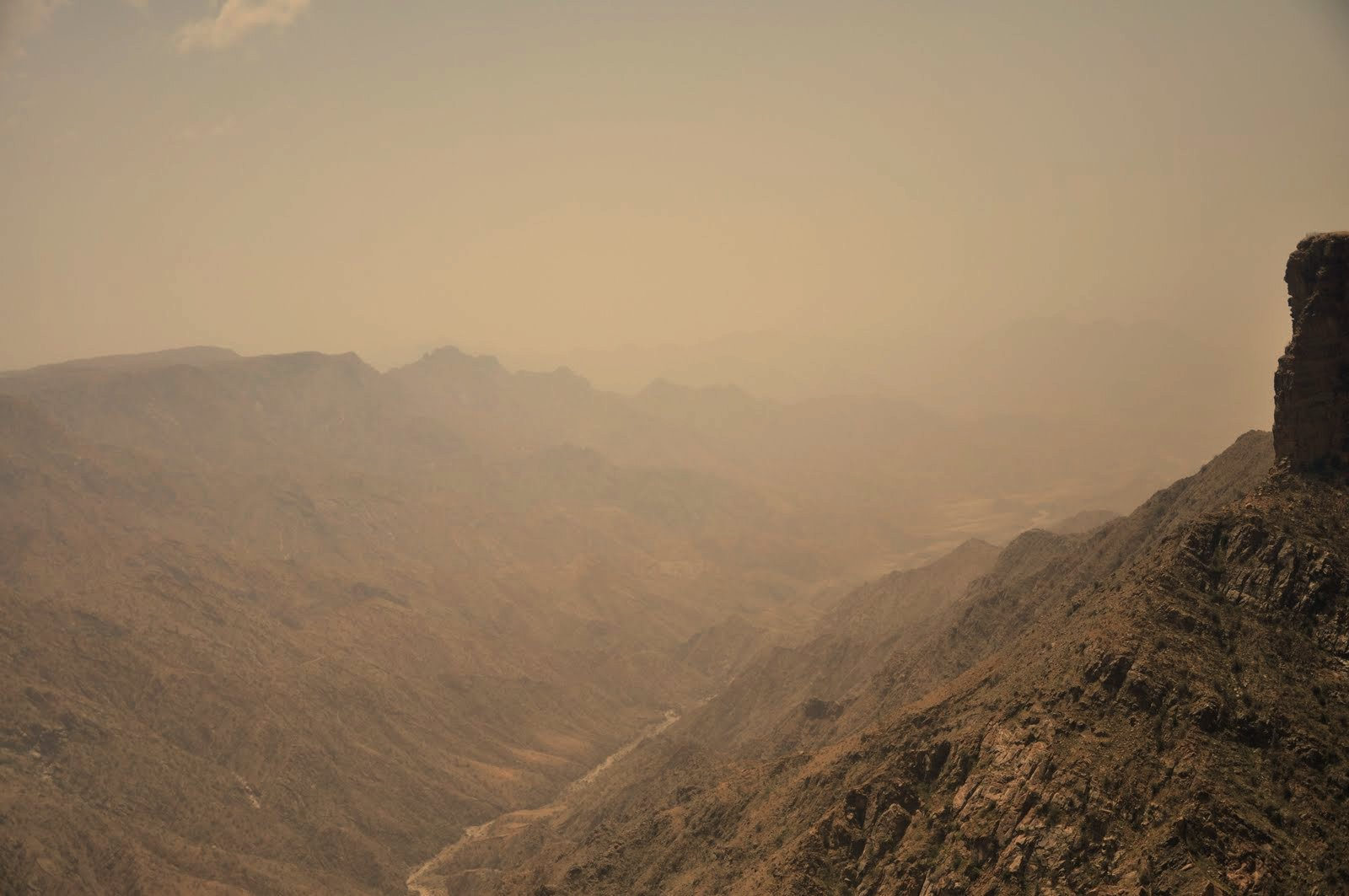
The Sarawat Mountains, which were used by the su'luk as a refuge after their raids.

The dates of Ta'abbata Sharran's life are not known. Based on personal names which occur in poems attributed to him, he likely lived in the late 6th century or early 7th century CE. He lived in the western Arabian regions of Tihama and the Hejaz, near the city of Ta'if.

His mother was Amima al-Fahmia, of the Banu al-Qayn. After the death of his father Jabr, his mother married one of his enemies, Abu Kabir al-Hudhali. Ta'abbata Sharran himself married a woman of the Banu Kilab.

He lived as a su'luk (plural sa'alik), a term which can be translated as brigand, brigand-poet, or vagabond. The sa'alik were mostly individuals who had been forced out of their tribes and who lived on the fringes of society. Some of the sa'alik became renowned poets, writing poetry about the hardships of desert life and their feelings of isolation. However, scholar Albert Arazi notes that due to a lack of contemporary documents about the sa'alik, knowledge of them is uncertain and "it is not at all easy to unravel the problem posed by the existence of this group."

Ta'abbata Sharran was one of the few su'luk poets who was not repudiated by his tribe. He lived as a brigand, accompanied by a band of men including Al-Shanfara, Amir ibn al-Akhnas, al-Musayyab ibn Kilab, Murra ibn Khulayf, Sa'd ibn al-Ashras, and 'Amr ibn Barrak. The band primarily raided the tribes of Bajila, Banu Hudhayl, Azd, and Khath'am, and evaded pursuit by hiding in the Sarawat Mountains. Narratives of his life are found in several literary sources beginning in the 8th century, and include stylized accounts of his exploits such as him pouring honey on a mountain in order to slide to safety after a raid.

The poet was eventually killed during a raid against the Banu Hudhayl, and his body was thrown into a cave called al-Rakhman.

== Poetry ==
Ta'abbata Sharran's poetic diwan consists of 238 verses divided into 32 poems and fragments. Typical of the su'luk poets, his work expresses strident individuality and a rejection of tribal values.

=== Qasida Qafiyya ===
Ta'abbata Sharran's "Qasida Qafiyya" (Note: Arabic poems typically do not have titles, so critics refer to them by the letter with which they rhyme, the type of poem, or the opening words of the poem. A qasida is a type of poem. Qafiyya denotes a poem rhymed in the letter qaf (ق).) is the opening poem of the Mufaddaliyat, an important collection of early Arabic poetry. According to the Italian orientalist Francesco Gabrieli, the Qafiyya may not have been written as a single poem, but might instead be a collection of Ta'abbata Sharran's verses compiled by later editors.

The opening lines of the Qafiyya are as follows:

O [memories] ever returning, such passionate yearning you bring, such sleeplessness and such a dream phantom that comes by night despite the terrors of the way,
Travelling at night time, barefoot despite serpents and snakes,
My soul's your ransom – for so fine a night traveler on foot!

This poem follows the traditional structure of the qasida, which consists of three sections: a nostalgic prelude, a description of a camel journey, and then the message or motive of the poem. However, the poet subverts this structure in order to express "the ideal of perpetual marginality". The poem also contains several lines devoted to fakhr (boasting) about the poet's fleetness of foot, starting with line 4: "I escape [from her] as I escaped from the Bajila, when I ran at top speed on the night of the sandy tract at al-Raht." The incident to which this line refers is explained in three different stories in the Kitab al-Aghani, which differ in their details but have to do with the poet being captured by the Bajila during a raid and using a ruse to escape. Ta'abbata Sharran, along with al-Shanfara and 'Amr ibn Barraq, was famous for being a fast runner.

Charles Lyall translated the poem into English in 1918.

=== Qasida Lamiyya ===
The "Qasida Lamiyya," (Note: Also called "The Ritha' of Ta'abbata Sharran".) transmitted in the 9th-century Hamasah of Abu Tammam, is considered to be another of the poet's major works. However, the authenticity of this poem is doubtful. Al-Tibrizi, a major commentator on the Hamasa, believed that the true author was the rāwī (reciter) Khalaf al-Ahmar, while the Andalusian anthologist Ibn Abd Rabbih attributed it to a nephew of Ta'abbata Sharran. Contemporary scholar Alan Jones concluded that it may be a mixture of authentic and inauthentic material. The poem is a rithā' (elegy) on the death of the poet's uncle, slain on a mountain path by the Banu Hudhyal. The poet describes his vengeance on the Banu Hudhayl, in what scholar Suzanne Stetkevych calls "the most famous Arabic poem of blood vengeance."

Johann Wolfgang von Goethe admired the poem greatly, and included a German translation of it in the "Notes and Queries" section of his 1819 work West–östlicher Divan. Goethe's translation was based on Latin translations by Georg Freytag and Johann David Michaelis. Other translations include those of Charles Lyall into English (1930), Suzanne Stetkevych into English (1986), and Pierre Larcher into French (2012).

=== Other work ===
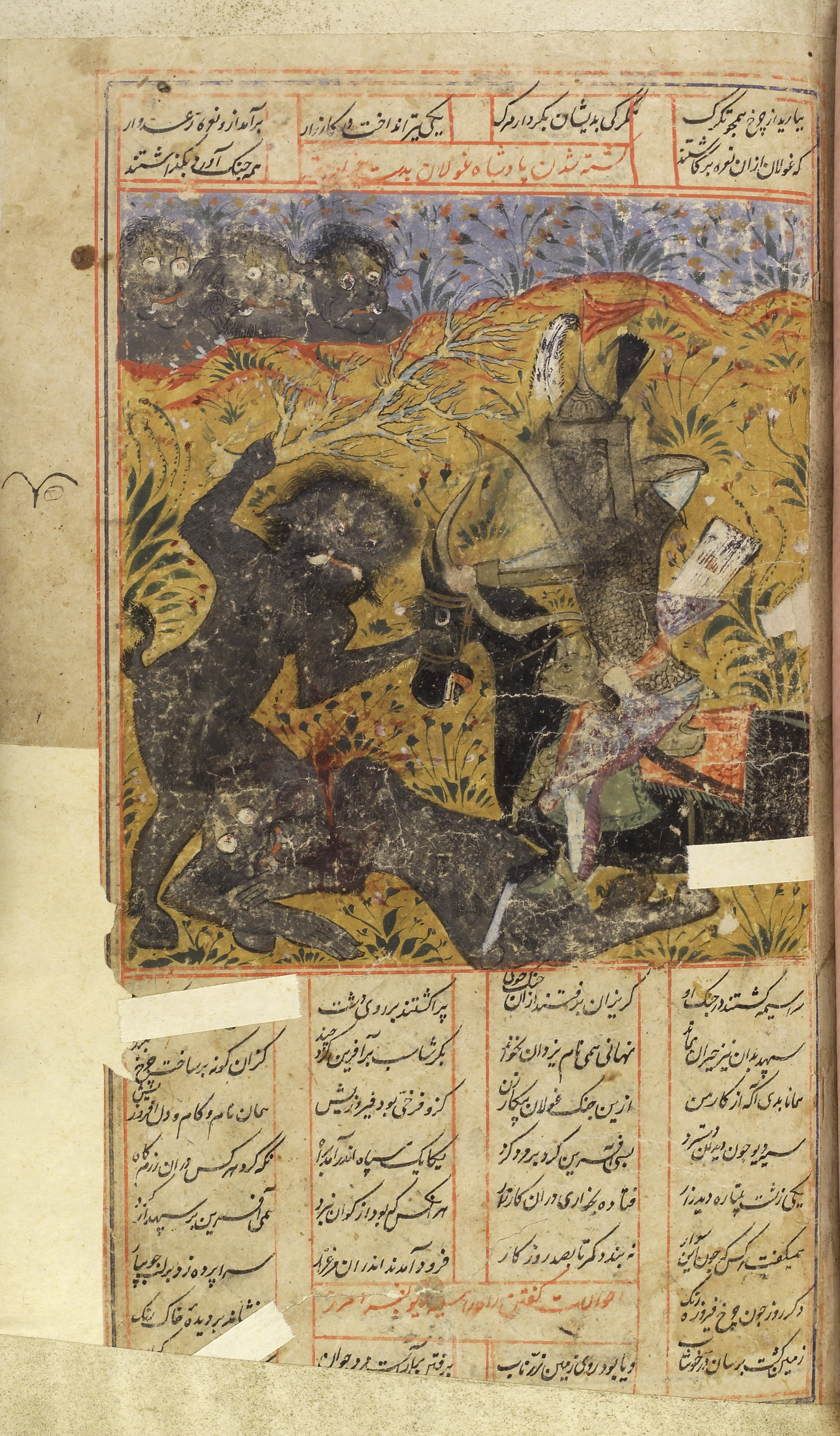
Tenth-century Persian representation of a group of ghuls

One poem, labelled either "How I Met the Ghul" or the "Qit'a Nuniyya," relates the story of the poet's encounter with a ghul. He was travelling at night in the territory of the Banu Hudhayl, when a ghul stepped in his way. He fought the ghul and killed her, then spent the night on top of her. In the morning he carried her under his arm and showed her to his friends: "Two eyes set in a hideous head, like the head of a cat, split-tongued, legs like a deformed fetus, the back of a dog." The structure of the poem parodies Arabic love poems in which lovers meet at night in the desert. In another, titled "Sulayma Says to Her Neighbor Women", (Note: This title comes from the opening words of the poem.) he meets a ghul and attempts to have sex with her, but she writhes and reveals her horrible face, which prompts him to cut her head off. Further examples of his work can be found in poems VIII and IX of the Hamasah.

== Legacy ==
A famous elegy in the Hamasah may refer to Ta'abbata Sharran. The author is unknown but is typically taken to be either Ta'abbata Sharran's mother or the mother of another su'luk, al-Sulayk bin al-Salaka. The poem emphasizes the role of fate:

He wandered the desert in quest of an escape from death, but he perished.
If only I knew what it was – a probable error – that killed you...
Whatever track a young man follows, the Fates lie in wait.

He was also mocked in a humorous hija' (lampoon) poem written by Qays ibn 'Azarah of the Banu Hudhayl, involving an incident in which Qays was captured by the Fahm and bargained for his life with Ta'abbata Sharran and his wife. In the poem Qays referred to Ta'abbata Sharran by the nickname Sha'l (firebrand), and his wife by the kunya Umm Jundab (mother of Jundab):

"The first thing we demand," said they, "is the she-camel al-Balha', her mates and herd."
May God defend me!
My mistress [in whose custody I was], Umm Jundab, commanded that I should be killed.
May no one hear of that!
She says: "Kill Qays. Cut out his tongue!"
It should be enough for them if someone were to cut off my head!
Sha'l, the fire-brand, commands I be put to certain death.
So to Sha'l, said I, "You're an ill pleader for my life!"
He would bestow a young she-camel from my ransom upon his wife
As if you were making presents from the leggy young she-camels of wealthy Ibn Jami'.

He also appeared as a character in the Resalat al-Ghufran, written by al-Ma'arri around 1033. During an imagined tour of hell, a Sheikh who criticized al-Ma'arri encounters Ta'abbata Sharran along with al-Shanfara, and asks him if he really married a ghul. Ta'abbata Sharran replies only, "All men are liars."

When Oriental studies became popular in Europe in the 19th century, scholars such as Silvestre de Sacy and Caussin de Perceval introduced su'luk poetry to a Western audience. They wrote first about al-Shanfara, whose Lamiyyat al-'Arab is the most famous su'luk poem. Interest in al-Shanfara led naturally to his associate Ta'abbata Sharran, who became known and appreciated in Europe during the 19th century. In the 20th century, Arab critics began to display renewed interest in su'luk poetry, and the influential Syrian poet and critic Adunis praised the works of Ta'abbata Sharran and al-Shanfara as quintessential specimens of "the literature of rejection."

== Editions ==
- Shakr, Ali Zulfiqar, ed. (1984). ديوان تأبط شرا و أخباره [Diwan Ta'abbata Sharran and his Reports]. Beirut: Dar al-Gharb al-Islami.

== Bibliography ==
- Abd al-Kareem, Najm (28 December 2003). "تأبط شرا.. ما بين الحقيقة والخرافة والخيال" [Ta'abbata Sharran...Between Truth, Myth, and Imagination]. al-Sharq al-Awsat (in Arabic).
- Allen, Roger (2005). The Arabic Literary Heritage: The Development of its Genres and Criticism. Cambridge University Press. ISBN 0-521-48525-8.
- Arazi, Albert (1997). "Su'luk". Encyclopaedia of Islam. Vol. 9 (2 ed.). Leiden: Brill Publishers. pp. 863–868. ISBN 9004104224.
- Arazi, Albert (2000). "Taʾabbaṭa S̲h̲arran". Encyclopaedia of Islam. Vol. 10 (2 ed.). Leiden: Brill Publishers. pp. 2–3. ISBN 9004112111.
- Bajraktarević, F. (2012). "Abū Kabīr al-Hud̲h̲alī". Encyclopaedia of Islam, Second Edition.
- El Tayib, Abdullah (1983). "Pre-Islamic Poetry". In A. F. L. Beeston; T. M. Johnstone; R. B. Serjeant; G. R. Smith (eds.). Arabic Literature to the End of the Umayyad Period. Cambridge University Press. ISBN 0521240158.
- Diez, Martino (2014). "Review of Le brigand et l'amant". Arabica. 61 (3/4): 464–466. doi:10.1163/15700585-12341302. ISSN 0570-5398. JSTOR 43306380.
- al-Isfahani, Abu al-Faraj (1900). al-Shanqayti, Ahmad (ed.). Kitab al-Aghani. Vol. 18.
- Jones, Alan (2011). Early Arabic Poetry: Select Poems. Ithaca Press. ISBN 9780863723872.
- Lyall, Charles James, ed. (1918a). The Mufaddaliyat; an anthology of ancient Arabian odes. Oxford, Clarendon Press.
- Lyall, Charles James (1918b). "Four Poems by Ta'abbata Sharra, the Brigand-Poet". Journal of the Royal Asiatic Society of Great Britain and Ireland (April 1918): 211–227. doi:10.1017/S0035869X00051467. ISSN 0035-869X. JSTOR 25209378. S2CID 163911985.
- Lyall, Charles James (1930). Translations of Ancient Arabian Poetry. London: Williams & Norgate Ltd.
- Mommsen, Katharina (2014). Goethe and the Poets of Arabia. Boydell & Brewer. ISBN 978-1-57113-908-5.
- Nicholson, Reynold A. (1900). "The Risālatu'l-͟G͟hufrān: By Abū'l-'Alā al-Ma'arrī". The Journal of the Royal Asiatic Society of Great Britain and Ireland (October 1900): 637–720. ISSN 0035-869X. JSTOR 25208246.
- Ramirez del Rio, Jose (2007). "Ta'bbata Šarran: trayectoria de un poeta bandido en la Arabia preislámica" [Ta'abbata Sharran: The life of a bandit-poet in pre-Islamic Arabia]. Anaquel de Estudios Árabes (in Spanish). 18: 201–215.
- Stetkevych, Suzanne Pinckney (1986a). "The Ritha' of Ta'abbata Sharran: A Study of Blood-Vengeance in Early Arabic Poetry". Journal of Semitic Studies. 31 (1).
- Stetkevych, Suzanne Pinckney (1986b). "Archetype and Attribution in Early Arabic Poetry: Al-Shanfarā and the Lāmiyyat al-'Arab". International Journal of Middle East Studies. 18 (3): 361–90. doi:10.1017/S0020743800030518. JSTOR 163382. S2CID 162810794.
- Stetkevych, Suzanne Pinckney (1993). The Mute Immortals Speak: Pre-Islamic Poetry and the Poetics of Ritual. Cornell University Press. ISBN 0-8014-2764-9.
