= Salah Labaki =

Lebanese poet, 1906–1955

- Born: 1906 São Paulo
- Died: 1955 (48–49 years) Beit Meri; Baabdat
- Citizenship: Lebanon
- Education: Law
- Occupations: Journalist, poet, and lawyer
- Notable work: Sa'am, Orjuhat al Qamar
- Style: Neo-romanticism, symbolism
- Political party: National Bloc, Syrian Social Nationalist Party
- Father: Naum Labaki

Salah Naoum Al Labaki (Arabic: صلاح لبكي; 1906–1955) was a Lebanese poet, scholar, journalist, and lawyer. His poems and writings (both literary and critical) have received academic attention. Some regard him to be among the poets who introduced "modern Arabic poetry" in the late 20th century. Labaki is considered a pioneer of the renewal movement in Arabic poetry, and more specifically in Lebanese poetry, in the second quarter of the 20th century. Some of his poems were translated into Spanish. He received the academic French medal, The National Order of Cedar in the officer rank, and an honorary degree from The International Institute of California.

== Life ==
Labaki was born on 6 August 1906 in São Paulo, Brazil. Originally from a Lebanese town called Baabdat, his father later moved to Brazil as a journalist. The family returned to Lebanon in 1908, where Labaki remained for the rest of his life.

The family resettled in their ancestral home in Baadbat, and the environment Labaki grew up in was far from safe; the Ottoman army was after his father and would pay surprise visits to his family almost every day, terrifying young Labaki and his brothers. Despite this, he spoke fondly of his hometown and was proud of belonging to its ancient history. He wrote:

My village is strongly built in a corner in the edifice of the nation, and a gracious hand in giving glory. In this far away place there were pimps and soldiers, who defended the good values of Lebanon, as well as writers, artists, and scholars, whose traces enriched the history of the civilization.

Labaki attended the St. Joseph School of the Capuchin Fathers in Baabdat and received private lessons in French. He then studied at Al Hikma school in Beirut (1918-1920) and later at the Saint-Joseph College of Aintoura. After obtaining a high school diploma in 1927, he entered the French Law Institute of Lebanon and graduated as a lawyer in 1930.

Labaki died from a heart attack in Beit Meri on 20 July 1955 and his body was moved to Baabdat for the burial.

== Career ==
Labaki was one of the Mahjar writers and the owner of "Arrakeeb" and "Al Manazer" newspapers. He was taught by his father and worked as a teacher during his years in university.

As the head of the Lebanese parliament in 1923 and because of his career in law alongside his father's political work, Labaki connected and worked with many known figures in Lebanon. During that period, Labaki's name appeared in multiple newspapers, including Al Basheer, Al Hadeth, Al Shiraa, Al Maarad, Al Makshouf, and Nidaa Al Watan. In 1946, he wrote for Al Basheer under the pen name Darwesh, but because of his aggressive opening, the newspaper was completely shut down. He later wrote for Al Aamal.

He gave lectures about Arabic poetry at the Institute of Arab Research and Studies in Cairo. He was interested in old and new Arabic literature. He also took an interest in French poetry and was particularly influenced by its romance and symbolism.

Labaki was a member of the National Bloc led by Émile Eddé. He was also part of the Syrian Social Nationalist Party and was voted vice president. He was incarcerated twice. In the winter of 1951, Labaki, Michael Asmar, Ahmad Mekky, Ghassan Tueni, and Jamel Jabr gathered at the Al Nahar newspaper's offices and created an organization named Ahel Al Qalam. Labaki was voted president from 1952 to 1955.

== Impact ==
Labaki wrote poetry and prose, and his books were printed multiple times. He also wrote poems that were not included in his books, but were published by newspapers like Al Qalb Al Dami, Mthli Kol Moheb, Otur Al Foaad, Al Thamaa, Mawt Al Shabab, Wa-ilayka bi-al-ward, and Fama Lelhar Ayesh Fi Makan.

== Works ==
Below is a list of Labaki's literary works:

=== Poetic ===
- Orjuḥat al qamar – 1938. Reprinted more than four times.
- Mawā'īd – 1943. Introduced to Rushdie Al Maalouf.
- Sa'am – 1949. Printed more than four times, and the beginning of the poem was written by the poet Said Aql.
- Ghurabāʼ - 1956. Published after his death.
- Ḥanīn – 1061. Published after his death.

=== Prosaic ===
- Min aʻmāq al-jabal (Articles) – 1945.
- Lubnān al-shāʻir – 1954.
- Al-tayyārāt al-adabiyyaẗ al-ḥadīthah fī Lubnān – 1955.
- He also translated: Būdlīr bi-qalamihi – 1969. Published after his death.

His poetic and prosaic works were published in two volumes in Beirut in 1981 according to the University Institution.
