= Sila (mythology) =

Supernatural creature

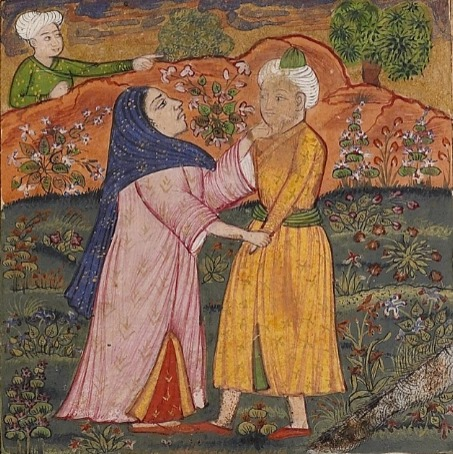
Illustration of a Sila seducing a man from a Persian miniature

Sila (Arabic: سعلى أو سعلا أو سعلاة alternatively spelled Si'la or called Si'lat literally: "Hag" or "treacherous spirits of invariable form" pl. Sa'aali adj: سعلوة su'luwwa) is a jinn from Arabian folklore. In early sources, Sila and ghoul were synonyms, but Sila later came to mean only the female counterpart of 'ghoul'.

Sila belongs to the malicious class of jinn. They are described as talented shapeshifters often appearing in human form, and female. Despite their impressive shapeshifting abilities, they can be discovered by their hybrid appearances of animals.

Accordingly, Si'lat are said to live in the desolate parts of the desert where they lead travellers and nomads astray, leading them to their deaths. They are also said to seduce and marry men or even give birth to a child from a relationship between human and jinn.

Silas are usually female and aligned to intercourse and a type of magical jinn, though not all of them are female or succubi.

== "Banu Si'lat" (children of Si'lat myth) ==
In pre-Islamic Arab countries, there was said to be one man who fell in love with a si'lat and had children who are known as "Banu Si'lat" It was rumored that the Arab population was conceived from descendants of 'Amr ibn Yarbu's' children who were half-si'lat. Their mother was said to have left her family behind after seeing lightning in the sky, interpreting this as a sign to return to her clan. According to the Iraqi historian, Mahmud Shukri al-Alusi, Arabs refer to si'lats as women who are said to be slim, witty, powerful and accused of being disloyal seductresses.

== See also ==
- Succubus - A similar being in European and Jewish mythology
- Churel - A similar being in mythology from the Indian Subcontinent
- Siren - Mermaid-like female beings in Greek mythology that lure men with their alluring voices
