= Lamiyyat al-'Arab =

The Lāmiyyāt al-‘Arab (the "L-song" of the Arabs) is the pre-eminent poem in the surviving canon of the pre-Islamic 'brigand-poets' (sa'alik). The poem also gained a foremost position in Western views of the Orient from the 1820s onwards. The poem takes its name from the last letter of each of its 68 lines, L (Arabic ل, lām).

The poem is traditionally attributed to the putatively sixth-century CE outlaw (ṣu‘lūk) Al-Shanfarā, but it has been suspected since medieval times that it was actually composed during the Islamic period. For example, the medieval commentator al-Qālī (d. 969 CE) reported that it was composed by the early anthologist Khalaf al-Aḥmar. The debate has not been resolved; if the poem is a later composition, it figures al-Shanfarā as an archetypal heroic outlaw, an anti-hero nostalgically imagined to expose the corruption of the society that produced him.

Notwithstanding its fame, the poem contains a large number of linguistic obscurities, making it hard to understand in Arabic today, let alone to translate reliably. The major philological study of the work was by Georg Jacob.

== Summary ==
In the words of Warren T. Treadgold,

Shanfarā is being abandoned by his tribe, who have apparently become disgusted with his thievery (1-4). He says he would rather live in exile anyway, for he has a more faithful tribe in the wild beasts of the desert (5-9) and his own resources (10-13). Unlike his sedentary tribe, Shanfarā is unmoved by hardship and danger (14-20). He disdains hunger (21-25), like the gray wolf, whom he describes in an extended simile (36-41). As for thirst, he bears it better even than the desert grouse (36-41). After years of bearing the injustices of war, now he has to bear the pains of exile (44-48). But his endurance is limitless (42-43, 49-53). On the stormiest nights, he raids camps single-handed (54-61); on the hottest days, he goes bareheaded (62-64). Finally, he depicts himself standing on a hilltop after a day of walking across the desert, admired even by the wild goats (65-68).

== Example ==
A good example of the poem's style and tone is provided by distichs 5-7 (3–5 in some editions).

The original text:

وَلِي دُونَكُمْ أَهْلُونَ سِيدٌ عَمَلَّسٌ
وَأَرْقَطُ زُهْلُولٌ وَعَرْفَاءُ جَيْأَلُ
هُمُ ٱْﻷهْلُ ﻻ مُسْتَوْدَعُ ٱلسِّرِّ ذَائعٌ
لَدَيْهِمْ وَﻻَ ٱلْجَانِي بِمَا جَرَّ يُخْذَلُ
وَكُلٌّ أَبِيٌّ بَاسِلٌ غَيْرَ أَنَّنِي
إِذَا عَرَضَتْ أُولَى ٱلطَّرَائِدِ أَبْسَلُ

Redhouse (1881):

3. And I have (other) familiars besides you; — a fierce wolf, and a sleek spotted (leopard), and a long-maned hyæna.
4. They are a family with whom the confided secret is not betrayed; neither is the offender thrust out for that which has happened.
5. And each one (of them) is vehement in resistance, and brave; only, that I, when the first of the chased beasts present themselves, am (still) braver.

Treadgold (1975):

I have some nearer kin than you: swift wolf,

Smooth-coated leopard, jackal with long hair.

With them, entrusted secrets are not told;

Thieves are not shunned, whatever they may dare.

They are all proud and brave, but when we see

The day's first quarry, I am braver then.

Stetkevych (1986):

5. I have closer kin than you: a wolf, swift and sleek,
a smooth and spotted leopard (smooth speckled snake),
and a long-maned one—a hyena.
6. They are kin among whom a secret, once confided, is not revealed;
nor is the criminal because of his crimes forsaken.
7. Each one is haughty-proud and reckless-brave,
except that I, when the first of the prey appear, am braver.

== Poem Translation ==
The following is a poetic translation for the first verses of Lamiyyat al-'Arab

أَقيموا بَني أُمّي صُدورَ مَطِيَّكُم

فَإِنّي إِلى قَومٍ سِواكُم لَأَمَيلُ

O sons of my clan, fix your affairs

As my soul, to other folks, adheres

فَقَد حُمَّت الحاجاتُ واللَيلُ مُقمِرٌ

وَشُدَّت لِطِيّاتٍ مَطايا وَأَرُحلُ

Things are fated, and the moon is full

To those aims, horses and camps, I'll pull

وَفي الأَرضِ مَنأى لِلكَريمِ عَنِ الأَذى

وَفيها لِمَن خافَ القِلى مُتَعَزَّل

On earth, for the decent, there must be a haven

To whom fears injustice, a land of isolation

لَعَمرُكَ ما في الأَرضِ ضيقٌ عَلى اِمرئٍ

سَرى راغِباً أَو راهِباً وَهوَ يَعقِلُ

By you I swear, a man won't face pain

If he left, for hope or fear, and he's sane

وَلي دونَكُم أَهلَونَ سيدٌ عَمَلَّسٌ

وَأَرقَطُ زُهلولٌ وَعَرفاءُ جَيأَلُ

I’ve got a family; a wolf of stamina

A skinny leopard and a hairy hyena

هُـمُ الأَهْلُ لا مُسْتَودَعُ السِّـرِّ ذَائِـعٌ

لَدَيْهِمْ وَلاَ الجَانِي بِمَا جَرَّ يُخْـذَلُ

A true family! They never spread your secret

Nor let you down in a trouble, to bear it

وَكُـلٌّ أَبِـيٌّ بَاسِـلٌ غَيْـرَ أنَّنِـي

إذا عَرَضَتْ أُولَى الطَرَائِـدِ أبْسَـلُ

Brave they are but I'm the bravest

When we spot a prey and chase it

وإن مدتْ الأيدي إلى الزاد لم أكن

بأعجلهم ، إذ أجْشَعُ القومِ أعجل

And when hands reach to the aliment

I wait as only the greedy is impatient

وماذاك إلا بَسْطَةٌ عن تفضلٍ عَلَيهِم

وكان الأفضلَ المتفضِّلُ

It's nothing but a kindness out of honour

The best in the folk is the man of honour

وَإنّـي كَفَانِـي فَقْدَ مَنْ لَيْسَ جَازِيَاً

بِحُسْنَـى ولا في قُرْبِـهِ مُتَعَلَّـلُ

I'm no longer in need for the ungrateful

And whose presence is never delightful

ثَـلاَثَـةُ أصْحَـابٍ : فُـؤَادٌ مُشَيَّـعٌ

وأبْيَضُ إصْلِيتٌ وَصَفْـرَاءُ عَيْطَـلُ

I'm sufficed by three pals; a brave heart

An unsheathed sword and a ruthless dart

هَتُـوفٌ مِنَ المُلْـس المُتُـونِ تَزِينُـه

رَصَائِعُ قد نِيطَـتْ إليها وَمِحْمَـلُ

My bow is strong, smooth and has tones

It's got a handle and was inlaid by stones

إذا زَلَ عنها السَّهْـمُ حَنَّـتْ كأنَّـها

مُـرَزَّأةٌ عَجْلَـى تُـرنُّ وَتُعْـوِلُ

When the arrow takes off, it seems

Like a bereaved woman who screams
وَأغْدو خَمِيـصَ البَطْن لا يَسْتَفِـزُّني

إلى الزَادِ حِـرْصٌ أو فُـؤادٌ مُوَكَّـلُ

And I return with a scrawny stomach

But never hurry to food like a maniac

وَلَسْـتُ بِمِهْيَـافٍ يُعَشِّـي سَوَامَـه

مُجَدَّعَـةً سُقْبَانُهـا وَهْيَ بُهَّـلُ

I'm not a naive who returns from grazing

With his camels un-fed, and starving

== Editions ==
- Muhammad ibn 'Umar al-Zamakhshari, A'jab al-'Ajab fi Sharh Lamiyyat al-'Arab, in al-Shanfara, Qasidat Lamiyyat al-'Arab wa yaliha (Istanbul: Matba't al-Jawa'ib, 1300H).
- al-Zamakhsharī, A‘jab al-‘Arab fī Sharḥ Lāmiyyat al-‘Arab (Dār al-Warāqa, 1972) (includes al-Zamakhsharī's commentary, and that attributed to al-Mubarrad)
- al-Mullūhī, al-Lāmiyyatān: Lāmiyyat al-‘Arab, Lāmiyyat al-‘Ajam (Damascus, 1966)
- Badī‘ Sharīf, Lāmiyyat al-‘Arab (Beirut, 1964)

== Translations ==
- A. I. Silvestre de Sacy, Chrestomathie Arabe, 2nd edn, 3 vols (Paris: Imprimerie impériale, 1826), II 134 ff.
- F. Rückert, H.amāsa I (Stuttgart, 1846), pp. 181–85
- Redhouse, J. W. (1881). "The L-Poem of the Arabs, قصيدة لامية العرب by Shanfarà للسنفرى". The Journal of the Royal Asiatic Society of Great Britain and Ireland. 13 (3): 437–467. doi:10.1017/S0035869X00017925. JSTOR 25196889. S2CID 162927377.
- M. Hillman, 'Lāmīyat al-‘Arab', Literature East and West, 15 (1971). (Prose translation.)
- Treadgold, Warren T. (1975). "A Verse Translation of the 'Lāmīyah' of Shanfarā". Journal of Arabic Literature. 6: 30–34. doi:10.1163/157006475X00023. JSTOR 4182935.
- Sells, Michael (1983). "Shanfara's lamiyya: a new version". Al-'Arabiyya. 16 (1/2): 5–25. JSTOR 43192551.
- Classical Arabic Poetry: 162 Poems from Imrulkais to Ma‘rri, trans. by Charles Greville Tuetey (London: KPI, 1985), pp. 106–7 [no. 10].
- Stetkevych, Suzanne Pinckney (1986). "Archetype and Attribution in Early Arabic Poetry: al-Shanfara and the Lamiyyat al-Arab". International Journal of Middle East Studies. 18 (3): 361–390. doi:10.1017/S0020743800030518. JSTOR 163382.
