= Apollo (journal) =

Literary magazine in Egypt (1932–1934)

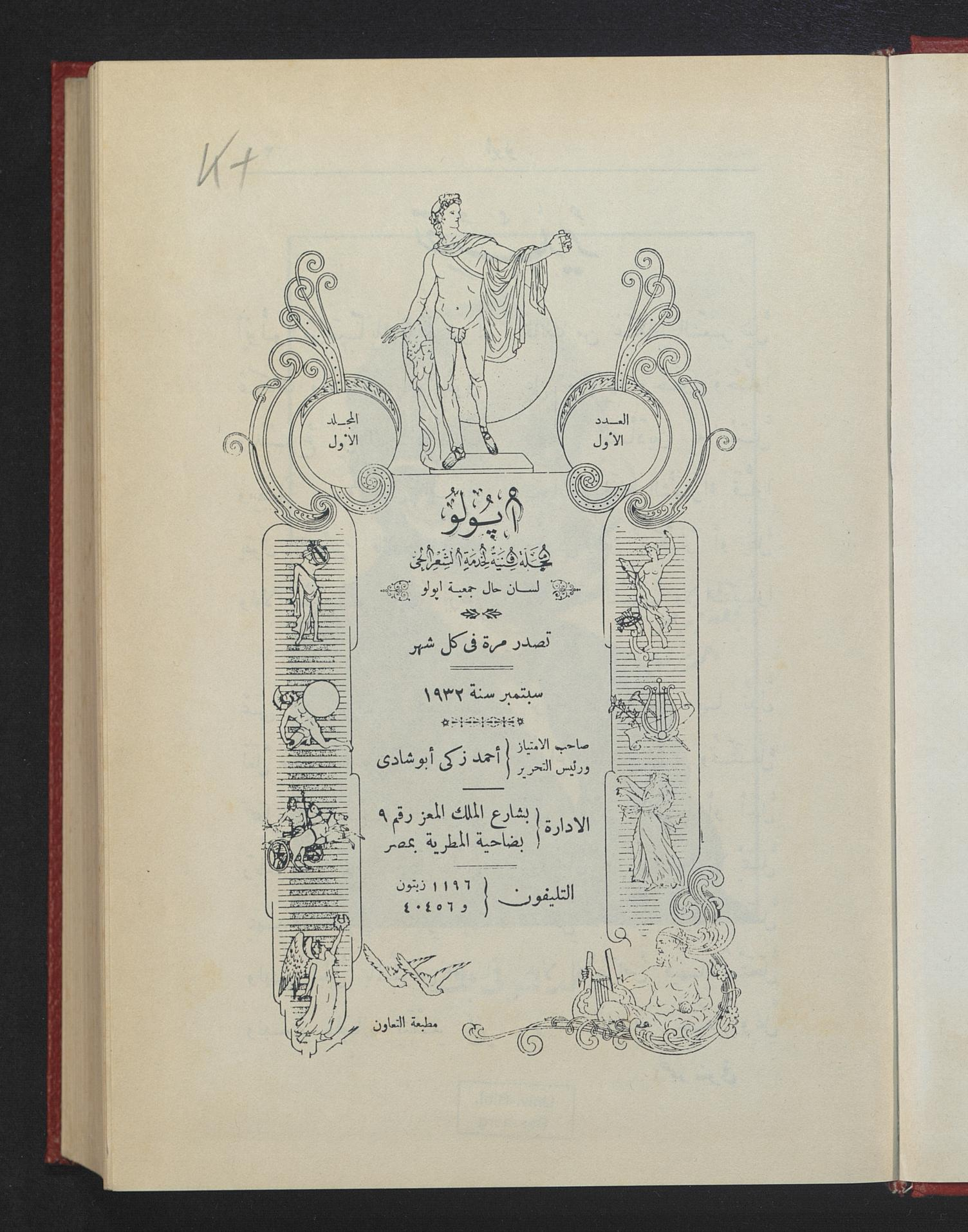
- Editor: Ahmed Zaki Abu Shadi
- Categories: Literary magazine
- Founder: Ahmed Zaki Abu Shadi
- Founded: 1932
- First issue: September 1932
- Final issue: 1934
- Country: Egypt
- Language: Arabic
- Website: Apollo

Apollo (Egyptian Arabic: اپولو; DMG: Apūllū) was an Arabic magazine, which appeared in Egypt from 1932 to 1934. The first issue was published in September 1932. Ahmed Zaki Abu Shadi (1892–1955) was the founder of the magazine. He was also the publisher of the first 25 issues and founded simultaneously the "Apollo Poet Society" which was dedicated to the renewal of Arab poetry and the disposal of traditional conventions.

Abu Shadi was not only a poet and author of numerous papers on politics, social reform, Islam and art but also a translator of some works by Hafez, Omar Khayyam and Shakespeare. His journal became an important medium for experimental Arabic poetry outside of Egypt and was considered to be a pioneer of modern Arabic literature.

After working as a publisher he went to the University of Alexandria to teach medicine and finally emigrated to New York in 1946. There he edited various Arab diaspora magazines.

In 1957 another magazine entitled Shi'r was established in Beirut, Lebanon, by the Shi'r movement which was significantly affected by the poetic approach of the Apollo Poet Society and Apollo.
