= Su'luk =

Arabic term for brigand-poet

In early Arabian history, ṣuʿlūk (Arabic: صعلوك, plural صعاليك, ṣaʿālīk) was a term that can be translated as brigand, brigand-poet, or vagabond. The sa'alik were mostly individuals who had been forced out of their tribes and who lived on the fringes of society, although some of them maintained ties with their tribes. Some of the sa'alik became renowned poets, writing poetry about the hardships of desert life and their feelings of isolation. Famous sa'alik include al-Shanfara, Ta'abbata Sharran, and Urwa ibn al-Ward. The sa'alik were most prominent in pre-Islamic Arabia, but persisted during the Umayyad and Abbasid caliphates.

== Terminology ==
The precise meaning of the term su'luk is difficult to determine, because in biographical materials about the sa'alik poets, the term is used most frequently in the sense of "honorable brigand". However, in poetic texts the term seems to mean "poor". Khatim al-Ta'i and al-A'sha make comparisons between wealth (ghina) and tasa'luk, which in that context probably means poverty, and al-Kakhlaba Hubayra ibn 'Abd Manaf speaks of "my generosity whether I be su'luk or the possessor of camels," suggesting the same meaning.

Related terms are sometimes used to describe the sa'alik, including dhu'ban (wolves) and khula'a, singular khali'. A khali' was an individual who had been cast out of his tribe, but eventually acquired the connotation of "a rebel who makes a conscious decision to practice evil". Another term associated with the sa'alik is aghribat al-Arab, literally "Arab crows," denoting an individual whose father was an Arab and whose mother was an African slave. As the sons of slaves, they were slaves themselves unless their fathers chose to recognize them. According to scholar Albert Arazi, the only sa'alik who were also aghribat al-Arab were Khufaf ibn Nudba, Sulayk ibn al-Salaka, and al-Harith ibn Sharid. Other sa'alik such as Ta'abbata Sharran and al-Shanfara are sometimes considered to have been aghribat al-Arab as well, but Bernard Lewis argued that this was due to confusion in the early sources between the two groups.

== History ==
Most sa'alik were excluded from their tribes, a process known as khala', usually in retaliation for a crime that dishonored the tribe. Those excluded could sometimes receive protection from another tribe, or they might be banished to a specific location, such as the mountain of Hadawda. These sa'alik often banded together to perform raids on the tribes, stealing camels or other goods. They may also have raided caravans and markets. The sa'alik could then sell these goods to other tribes. Some sa'alik, such as Urwa ibn al-Ward, were popularly celebrated as romantic heroes who helped the poor.

In the early days of Islam, Muhammad offered to spare the lives of the sa'alik if they converted, and allowed them to keep their stolen booty. They served as mercenaries during the First Fitna, particularly in the Battle of the Camel. They flourished as bandits during the Umayyad Caliphate, but under the Abbasid Caliphate their composition seems to have shifted. They became "quasi-military units composed of Arabs who invested a province, established themselves there and practised brigandage on a major scale, and with such success that garrisons of regular troops were unable to dislodge them." Sa'alik also fought for Yazid ibn Umar al-Fazari during the Siege of Wasit in 749–750.

== Poetry ==
According to Albert Arazi, su'luk poetry had three major themes, or parameters. The first, the apologetic parameter, concerns the hard life of the poet with emphasis on his poverty, his courage, and his endurance. The poet may celebrate the virtue of sabr (endurance) and contrast it with the comparatively easy life of the tribes. In the second, the lyrical parameter, the poet describes his journeys through the desert, evoking the desert and its plants and wildlife, as well as the raiding and looting activities of the poet and his band. He may stress his kinship with the animals of the desert, such as wolves and hyenas. Finally, in the therapeutic parameter, the poet meditates on the imminence of death. The most famous su'luk poem is the Lamiyyat al-'Arab of Al-Shanfara. Poetic production by the sa'alik began in the pre-Islamic era and continued throughout the Umayyad period, but disappeared under the Abbasids. Only one su'luk poet is attested during the Abbasid caliphate, Bakr ibn al-Nattah.

== List of sa'alik ==
- Shudhadh al-Dhabi
- Abu Kharash al-Hudhli
- Urwa ibn al-Ward
- Sulayk ibn al-Salaka
- Mara ibn Khulayf al-Fahmi
- Ta'abbata Sharran
- Al-Buradh ibn Qays al-Kanani
- Uhaymar Al-Sa'di
- Al-Shanfara
- Malak ibn al-Rib
- Al-Harath ibn Dhalm al-Mari
- Ubayd ibn Aiyoub al-Anbari
- Hajiz ibn 'Aouf al-Azdi
- Al-Ataylas al-A'sar al-Baqmi
- Al-Khatim ibn Nuwayra al-'Abashmi
- Al-Qatal al-Kilabi
- Fadhala ibn Sharik al-Asadi
- Sakhr al-Ghay
- Mas'oud ibn Kharsha al-Mazni

== Bibliography ==
- Allen, Roger (2005). The Arabic Literary Heritage: The Development of its Genres and Criticism. Cambridge University Press. ISBN 0-521-48525-8.
- Arazi, Albert (1997). "Su'luk". Encyclopaedia of Islam. Vol. 9 (2 ed.). Leiden: Brill Publishers. pp. 863–868. ISBN 9004104224.
- Ayub, Mohammad Sha'ban (31 October 2017). "صعاليك العرب.. كيف عاشوا وما فلسفتهم في الحياة؟" [The Arab Sa'alik...how did they live and what was their philosophy in life?]. Al-Jazeera (in Arabic).
- Lewis, Bernard (1985). "The Crows of the Arabs". Critical Inquiry. 12 (1): 88–97. doi:10.1086/448322. ISSN 0093-1896. JSTOR 1343463. S2CID 162283123.
- Stetkevych, Suzanne Pinckney (1986). "Archetype and Attribution in Early Arabic Poetry: Al-Shanfarā and the Lāmiyyat al-'Arab'". International Journal of Middle East Studies. 18 (3): 361–390. doi:10.1017/S0020743800030518. JSTOR 163382.
