= Al-Shanfara =

Semi-legendary pre-Islamic poet

- الشنفرى
- Died: c. 525 CE
- Occupation: Poet
- Writing career
- Language: Arabic
- Notable work: Lāmiyyāt ‘al-Arab

Al-Shanfarā (Arabic: الشنفرى; died c. 525 CE) was a semi-legendary pre-Islamic poet tentatively associated with Tanomah from Bani Shehr Tribe, and the author of the celebrated poem Lāmiyyāt ‘al-Arab. He enjoys a status as a figure of an archetypal outlaw antihero (su'luk), critiquing the hypocrisies of society from his position as an outsider.

== Life ==
The name Al-Shanfara means "he who has large lips." His full name may be either Thabit ibn Malik or Thabit ibn Aws. What is known about al-Shanfarā is inferred from the poems which he is believed with confidence to have composed. He seems fairly certainly to have belonged to the Yemenite al-Azd tribe, probably specifically to the Al-Khazraj clan. He is sometimes counted among the aghribat al-Arab (Arab crows), a term referring to Arabs with African mothers. Others argue against his inclusion in this group, which according to scholar Bernard Lewis is due to a confusion between the sa'alik and the aghribat al-Arab in some early sources.

Al-Shanfarā attracted a number of pseudo-historical akhbar (reports) in texts like the Kitab al-Aghani by Abu al-Faraj Al-Isfahani or the commentary on the Mufaddaliyat by Muhammad bin al-Qasim al-Anbari. These akhbar mostly focus on explaining how he came to be exiled from his tribe. One such story relates that when he was young he was taken captive by the Fahm tribe. A different clan of his own tribe, the Azd, later captured one of the Fahm and ransomed him for al-Shanfara. He lived among them as one of them, until he quarreled with a young woman of the tribe, who rejected him on as not being from a different clan. At this point he returned to the Fahm, and swore revenge on the Azd. In another version of the story, he turns against his tribe because another tribesman murdered his father, and the tribe refused to apply the law of blood-vengeance. Scholars regard these accounts as later myths developed to explain the poet's hatred for his tribe. Al-Shanfara and his companion Ta'abatta Sharran were thought to be among the few people of pre-Islamic Arabia who could run down an antelope.

Al-Shanfara died around 525. The traditional account of his death has it that he was killed in retaliation for his killing of Haram ibn Jabir. He was ambushed at night by Haram's brother and two sons, who bound him and took him back to the tribe. When the tribe asked him where he wanted to be buried, he is reported to have replied with the following lines:

Do not bury me, for my burial is forbidden to you, but rejoice, oh Hyena!
When they carry off my head – and in my head is most of me – and the rest of me lies abandoned on the battlefield,
Then I will have no desire for a life to cheer me through stagnating nights, anathematized by my crimes.

A final aspect of the traditional accounts is that Shanfara had sworn to kill 100 of the Azd, but at his death he had only killed 99. Later, one of the Al-Azd passed by his bones and kicked his skull, but sustained a splinter which eventually mortified and killed him, thus completing Shanfara's vow.

== Works ==
Al-Shanfarā is named as the author of a scattering of individual verses as well as a long passage known as The Ta’iyya of al-Shanfarā preserved in the seminal collection of pre-Islamic verse, the Mufaḍḍaliyāt. His works are discussed in at least twenty medieval and early medieval scholarly commentaries.

=== Lamiyyat al-Arab ===
Al-Shanfarā is most famous for, supposedly, composing the Lamiyyat al-'Arab, or L-poem of the Arabs. (Note: Arabic poems typically do not have titles, so critics refer to them by the letter in which they rhyme, the type of poem, or the opening words of the poem. Lamiyya denotes a poem rhymed in the letter lam (ل). Similarly, a ta'iyya is rhymed in ta (ت), and a fa'iyya is rhymed in fa (ف).) Although its attribution has been disputed ever since medieval times, the memorable first-person figure of the misanthropic brigand celebrating his position on the edge of society that the poem draws has strongly influenced views of al-Shanfarā. We can if nothing else say that if the Lāmiyyāt is a later composition, it positions al-Shanfarā as the archetypal outlaw of a pre-Islamic heroic age, viewed nostalgically from a later era.

=== Ta'iyya ===
The Ta’iyya of al-Shanfarā (Mufaḍḍaliyya no. 20) is the poet's most renowned poem after the Lamiyya, and its authorship has rarely been disputed. The nasib (amatory prelude) of the poem is admired by scholars for its "striking beauty" (verses 1–14). In Charles James Lyall's translation, the poem beings:

Alas! Ummu 'Amr set firm her face, and has flitted and gone:

she bade no farewell to her neighbours what time she went away.
She gave us no warning of what she purposed, but suddenly
the necks of her camels towered above us as forth they sped.
She dwelt in my eyes at even, at night, and when morning dawned;
and now has she ended all things, and flitted and passed and gone.
Alas my heart for Umaimah and all my longing for her!

yea, she was my life's delight, and now all its joy is fled.

This section combines extensive praise of Umm 'Amr/Umaimah with regret for the loss of her love. In lines 15–18, the poet transitions to a description his band of brigands and their raiding lifestyle: "Many a fighting band, their bows red from wear, did I call forth" (line 15). He explains how he travels far afield on his raids, "to strike a foe or meet up with my doom" (line 17). He then begins to praise umm 'iyal, (mother of the hearth and home) in lines 19–27, beginning with the line "A mother of many children I have seen feeding them." Scholars believe that umm 'iyal is Shanfara's compainion, Ta'abbata Sharran, and that this section is an extended simile describing how Ta'abbata Sharran took care of his companions. As the description progresses it becomes increasingly clear in the text that umm 'iyal is a man: "a companion of sa'alik, there is no veil before her" gives to way "she rushes upon the battle-ready foe, baring her leg to the knee" and then "when they panic she lets fly a white cutting; she shoots her store of arrows, then draws her blade" (lines 22–25). The reason for the gender inversion in this passage has not been fully explained.

The climax of the poem occurs in the line 28:

We slew a pilgrim for a pilgrim slain, one leading a beast to sacrifice for one with matted hair;
at Mina where the stones are thrown, in the midst of chanting pilgrims.

According to Al-Anbari's commentary, this line depicts al-Shanfara killing Haram ibn Jabir, the murderer of his father. Whether historical or strictly literary, the story is striking for its violation of cultural taboos. Killing a pilgrim was an abomination, although in this case Shanfara's father seems to have been killed during a pilgrimage as well.

=== Fa'iyya ===
Another poem, the Fa'iyya, finds the poet on a hill-top at night, preparing for a raid. Shanfara gives a detailed description of his weapons, especially his bow and arrows, and also reveals his affection for his companions.

== Legacy ==
Al-Shanfara appeared as a character in the Resalat Al-Ghufran, written by Al-Ma'arri around 1033. During an imagined tour of hell, a Sheikh who criticized al-Ma'arri encounters al-Shanfara along with Ta'abbata Sharran.

== Editions ==
- ‘Abd al-‘Azīz al-Maymanī, Al-T.arā’if al-Adabiyyah (Cairo: Mat.ba‘at Lajnat al-Ta’līf wa al-Tarjamah wa al-Nashr, 1937), 31-42 (most of al-Shanfarā's poetry, excluding the Lāmiyyat al-‘Arab and the Mufaḍḍaliyyah no. 20).
- For editions of the Lāmiyyāt ‘al-Arab, see that entry.

== Bibliography ==
=== Traditional ===
- Lyall, Charles James, ed. (1918). The Mufaddaliyat; an anthology of ancient Arabian odes. Vol. 2. Oxford, Clarendon Press.

=== Contemporary ===
- Allen, Roger (2005). The Arabic Literary Heritage: The Development of its Genres and Criticism. Cambridge University Press. ISBN 0-521-48525-8.
- Arazi, Albert (1997). "Al-Shanfara". Encyclopaedia of Islam. Vol. 9 (2 ed.). Leiden: Brill Publishers. pp. 301–303. ISBN 9004104224.
- A. F. L. Beeston; T. M. Johnstone; R. B. Serjeant; G. R. Smith, eds. (1983). "Background Topics". Arabic Literature to the End of the Umayyad Period. Cambridge University Press. ISBN 0521240158.
- Khulayf, Yusuf (1978). الشعراء الصعاليك في العصر الجاهلية [The Brigand-Poets in the Pre-Islamic Era] (in Arabic) (3 ed.). Dar al-Ma'arif.
- Lewis, Bernard (1985). "The Crows of the Arabs". Critical Inquiry. 12 (1): 88–97. doi:10.1086/448322. ISSN 0093-1896. JSTOR 1343463. S2CID 162283123.
- Mansour, Wisam (2005). "Al-Shanfara's Lamiyyatu'l Arab and the Horrors of Desert Travelling" (PDF). Ankara Üniversitesi Dil ve Tarih-Coğrafya Fakültesi Dergisi. 45 (2): 45–57. doi:10.1501/Dtcfder_0000000929 (inactive 12 July 2025).
- Nicholson, Reynold A. (1900). "The Risālatu'l-͟G͟hufrān: By Abū'l-'Alā al-Ma'arrī". The Journal of the Royal Asiatic Society of Great Britain and Ireland: 637–720. ISSN 0035-869X. JSTOR 25208246.
- Sezgin, Fuat (1975). Geschichte des arabischen Schrifttums: Bd. 2, Poesie Bis ca. 430 H. Leiden: Brill.
- Stetkevych, Suzanne Pinckney (1986). "Archetype and Attribution in Early Arabic Poetry: Al-Shanfarā and the Lāmiyyat al-'Arab". International Journal of Middle East Studies. 18 (3): 361–90. doi:10.1017/S0020743800030518. JSTOR 163382.
- Tuetey, Charles Greville, ed. (1985). Classical Arabic Poetry: 162 Poems from Imrulkais to Ma'rri. London: KPI.
