= Seif Wanly =

Egyptian artist (1906–1979)

Mohammed Seif al-Din Wanly
- Born: March 31, 1906; Alexandria, Egypt
- Died: February 15, 1979 (aged 72); Stockholm, Sweden
- Known for: Painting
- Awards: Egyptian State Merit Award (1973)

Mohammed Seif al-Din Wanly (Arabic: محمد سيف الدين اسماعيل محمد وانلي), most commonly referred to simply as Seif Wanly (سيف وانلي) (March 31, 1906 – February 15, 1979) was an Egyptian painter.

== Early life and career ==
Wanly was born in Alexandria, Egypt, in 1906 into an aristocratic family of Turkish origin.

He introduced modern art to Egypt after studying at the studio of the Italian artist Otorino Becchi. In 1942 he set up his own studio with his brother Adham Wanly and together they participated in more than 17 exhibitions, notably in the Biennale of Venice and in São Paulo, Brazil. In the late 1950s, Wanly travelled to Nubia to produce a series of paintings and drawings portraying life in Upper Egypt for a governmental project to document culture and conditions prior to the relocation that occurred to enable construction of the Aswan High Dam. Today an entire floor of the Mahmoud Said Museum in Alexandria is dedicated to Seif and Adham Wanly.

His work is collected by several Museums, including Mathaf: Arab Museum of Modern Art in Doha, Darat AL Funoon in Amman, and the Barjeel Art Foundation in Sharjah.

== Personal life ==
He died in 1979 at Stockholm at age of 72.

== Commemorations ==
In 2015, Google Doodle commemorated his 109th birthday.
