= Adham Wanly =

Egyptian painter (1908–1959)

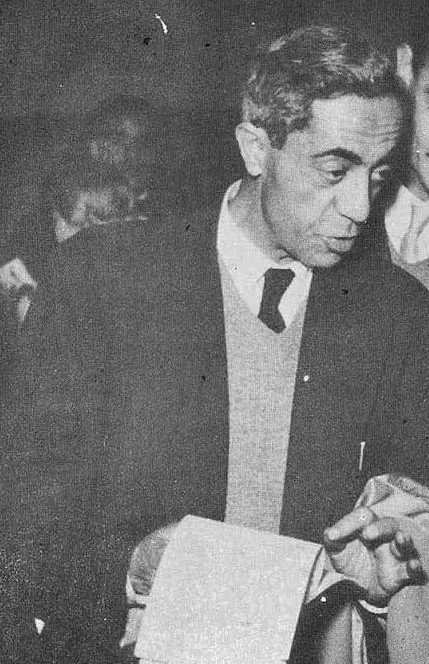
- Born: 25 February 1908
- Died: 20 December 1959 (aged 51)

Adham Wanly (Arabic: إبراهيم أدهم إسماعيل محمد وانلي) (25 February 1908 in Alexandria, Egypt – 20 December 1959) was an Egyptian painter who learnt in the atelier of the Italian Otorino Becchi 1932, then set up his own atelier with his brother Seif Wanly, and participated in many local and international exhibitions, especially Venice, São Paulo (Brasil), Alexandria Biennale.

== Works ==
The Museum of Modern Art in Alexandria displays many of his paintings. The artist is mostly famous for recording the life of the theater and circus. He specialized in the ballet and opera that is featured in the Cairo Opera House and the Theatre Mohamed Ali in Alexandria. The paintings render the stage lights and movements of the people involved and he is able to express the light and agility in various ways. He had a talent in caricature in which he used in mockery of himself and the people of his time. There is now a museum in his memory.

== Personal life ==
His brother was the painter Seif Wanly; they were from an Alexandrian family, his mother was Egyptian and his dad was partial Turkish via his late great-grandfather.
