= Experimental theatre in the Arab world =

Experimental theatre in the Arab world emerged in the post-colonial era as a fusion of Western theatrical traditions with local performance cultures such as music and dance. It is characterized by hybridity as it transposes Arabic traditional performances that were usually seen in public squares and marketplaces to theatre buildings. Experimental theatre in the Arab world has historically taken forms of Forum theatre by using audience participation as a way to smooth conflicts and resolve social tension. The audience is then transformed from a commonly passive one into a proactive and involved one. It has been seen as a form of theatre of resistance and cultural activism, dealing with contemporary sensitive issues of the region such as the Israeli–Palestinian conflict, the Arab Spring, the role of women in Arabic society and religion. Such issues are often dealt with using humour.

Throughout the years, experimental theatre in the Arab world has gradually converted into a synonymous of non-mainstream and underground art movements in which artists are always evolving and breaking down conventional markers between actors and spectators. The script combines the appropriation and dis-appropriation of Western models and is usually organic, more improvisational and self-reflexive. In the late 2000s, improvisational theatre, which takes forms of stand-up comedy shows, has also emerged around the Arab world.

== Context ==
In some countries of the region, especially in Gulf States, the state (government) is heavily involved with experimental theatre as a way to control public access to it. Egypt was the first country to launch an experimental theatre festival (Cairo International Festival for Experimental Theatre) through the Ministry of Culture in 1989. In other countries, experimental theatre has emerged in the streets and in the midst of political turmoil by artist-driven initiatives.

== History ==
In the late 20th century, Arab theatre had a strong will to break with Western forms as a way to reject European colonialist practices. Many artists, from North Africa to the Middle East, started favouring gatherings of the audience in a circle, a halqa, instead of Western proscenium theatre arrangement.

Many independence movement politicians encouraged theatre activity as a way to empower the majority of illiterate people. After independence movements, an increasing number of Arab students who had studied abroad started to adapt Shakespeare and Molière plays within the local context.

Meanwhile, local playwrights such as Yusif Idris started calling for an original Arabic theatre. Yusif Idris' masterpiece, "al-Farafir" (The Flipflops), is still considered a central reference for experimental theatre in the region. Tamer forms of theatre followed, and the avant-garde idea of having an active spectator became a firmly established convention.

After the Arab Spring, many plays by Middle-Eastern writers have revealed it through the lens of repression and torture. Influenced by the role of social media on the Arab uprisings, some artists have even expanded the process of engaging the audience in political activism in response to contemporary issues by introducing interactive media, such as Internet and videos, into the plays.

== Categories ==
Experimental theatre in the Arab world can be divided into three geographical categories: the Middle East, Maghreb (North Africa), and the Persian Gulf states.

=== Middle East ===
The Middle East has been the most enthusiastic and avant-gardiste experimental theatre in the Arab world. It mainly started in the early-90s with the Ashtar Theatre, which became the first company to adapt the methodology of the Theatre of the Oppressed on the Israeli–Palestinian conflict in the Middle East. Since the Arab Spring, new forms of experimental theatre, largely using techniques of the Theatre of the Oppressed have emerged at accelerated pace all around the region.

In Egypt, two months after the fall of Hosni Mubarak in February 2011, the Independent Culture Coalition launched a monthly culture festival called El-Fan Midan (meaning Art is a Square) which aims to bring arts and culture to the streets of Egypt. The drama troupe Masrah al-Maqhurin was included in the festival and performed interactive skits that required audience participation. Another theatric performance that originated after the Arab Spring is the Tahrir Monologues. This project consists of a mix of professional and amateur actors who go on stage and deliver short personal stories collected in Tahrir Square and through social networks. The stories are often emotional accounts of solidarity, fear, and violence. In November 2011, theatre director and actress Nora Amin launched "The Egyptian National Project for Theatre of the Oppressed" in Alexandria.

Lebanese film-maker and theatre director Lucien Bourjeily brought improvisational theatre to the streets of Beirut during the 2008 conflict in Lebanon. In his last work, "66 Minutes in Damascus" (2012), Bourjeily was inspired by the declarations of foreign journalists and local activists on Syrian detention centres. His play is considered one of the most extreme kinds of interactive theatre, as the audience played the role of kidnapped tourists. More recently, Rabih Mroué and Lina Saleh put on stage "33 rounds and a few seconds" which is a play with many communication tools but without actors. The play is a huis clos which deals with the mysterious suicide of a human rights activist debated on Facebook in Lebanon.

While theatre in Palestine has existed since the late Ottoman period, the first major locally based theatre company was The Palestinian National Theatre, or El-Hakawati Theatre (Arabic: المسرح الوطني الفلسطيني), which began as a touring troupe of dramatists, directors, and actors in 1977, establishing a formal theater headquartered in East Jerusalem in 1984. From the start, the theatre was deeply involved in staging productions in its own center, located in East Jerusalem, as well as touring throughout the Occupied Territories, with the goal of developing local theater, encouraging and enabling greater social cohesion, solidarity and sumud (steadfastness), and providing opportunities for local Palestinian artists more broadly to develop their crafts. In 1991, prominent Palestinian actors Edward Muallem and Iman Aoun established the Ashtar Theatre in Jerusalem, and four years later moved to Ramallah. Ashtar Theatre pioneered several programs focused on disadvantaged groups, such as women and youth in the region, based on the techniques of the Theatre of the Oppressed. Ashtar Theatre often travelled to remote areas in order to perform for marginalized audiences which allowed them to bring an appreciation of theatre to new audiences in cities, villages, and refugee camps throughout Palestine. In 2005, Ashtar Theatre's program introduced the idea of Legislative theatre in the region. In 2007, Ashtar Theatre became the official “Middle East Regional Centre for Theatre of the Oppressed” in collaboration with Augusto Boal’s Centre for the Theatre of the Oppressed in Rio de Janeiro, Brazil, and started conducting regional training in Yemen and Iraq.

Perhaps the most internationally known experimental theater company in Palestine during the last two decades has been the Jenin Freedom Theatre (also known as The Freedom Theatre), which was established in 2006 by the noted, half Jewish, half-Palestinian actor Juliano Mer-Khamis and one-time al-Aqsa Brigade commander Zakaria Zubeidi, who had studied with Mer-Khamis's mother, Arna Mer-Khamis, at a theater program she established in the Jenin Refugee Camp during the first Intifada to help treat traumatized children. As well as staging many important Palestinian and international productions as well as touring the world, the Freedom Theatre has become an important drama school and has offered training in many experimental and avant-garde techniques, including Theatre of the Oppressed, Theatre of Cruelty, and Playback Theatre. Allegedly because of its boundary-pushing art and the violation of the conservative mores of the local population it represented, Mer-Khamis was murdered in front of the Theatre in April 2011.

Another theatre initiative was held by the Seeds of Peace Center via the bi-national movement of Israelis and Palestinians, Combatants for Peace. Image theatre was used with separate Israeli and Palestinian groups to reveal conflicting views. Forum theatre techniques were also deployed, which led to “spect-actor” interventions with separate Jewish and Arab students focusing on violence-charged scenarios.

In Jordan, Prof. Fadi Skeiker started a free space for experimentation in performing arts, the Amman Theatre Lab. Based on Henry Giroux's concept of border pedagogy, he studied the role of applied theatre in empowering orphan Palestinian youths who live in one of the biggest refugee camps in the Middle East, the Baqa'a camp.

=== Maghreb ===
Contrary to typical experimental drama, whose audience is an intellectual élite, experimental theatre in the Maghreb is more popular and reaches wider audiences. The performances take place in public spaces amidst spectators who form a halqa (circle) around the storyteller. They consist of storytelling of daily life or historical events by a narrator. The narrator chooses a subject, which is usually historical or religious, and starts improvising praise, mainly using colloquial Arabic. The script is unfinished and full of holes, which gives freedom to the actor to improvise. The performance often depends on the ability of a single person who performs various roles. Storytellers include dramatic elements such as dancing and singing. During French occupation in the region, storytellers had such a success that some were censored by authorities. Pioneers of this genre of popular theatre in Algeria are Abdelkader Alloula and Rachid Ksentini. In Morocco, Mohammed Kaghat is seen as one of the best representatives of the Moroccan murtajala, a subversive, comic and ironic improvised representation of theatre practices. In Tunisia, an Experimental Theatre Festival has taken place in Medenine since 1992.

=== Gulf States ===
The experimental theatre creation process in the Gulf states has strong state involvement. In 2011, Gulf states launched an innovative digital project named "Gulf stage". It consists of an online platform that shares recorded performances of young theatre companies from Bahrain, Kuwait, Oman, Qatar, Saudi Arabia, and the United Arab Emirates with a global audience. The featured companies were chosen by a contest in which the actors and creative teams of each participating country had only one day to build a set, rehearse, and perform. The project involved many partners: the British Council; Digital Theatre; the Ministry of Culture, Arts and Heritage of Qatar; and the Qatar Foundation.

== See also ==
- STAR TOO is an experimental theatre project based in Dubai. Their latest production "Is It Real?" combined a giant projector box, shadow puppet theatre and a 360 degree experience for the audience.
- Leish Troupe is one of the few independent and experimental theatre groups in Syria. Their latest production dealt with identity and analysed the roles assigned to men and women in society. In the performance, male and female audience are divided. While the female audience sees the portray of the rituals assigned to women, the male audience sees those that men go through during a funeral.
- ImproBeirut was founded in March 2008 by director Lucien Bourjeily as the first professional improvisational theatre shows in the Middle East. ImproBeirut has been in innovating improvisational formats by launching theatre sports and dimensional interactive improvised theatre or 4D theatre.
- An Enemy of the People – an Arabic adaptation of Ibsen's play directed by Nora Amin in Egypt during 2013.
