= Ashtar Theatre =

Palestinian theatre organisation

Coordinates: 31.9°N 35.2°E

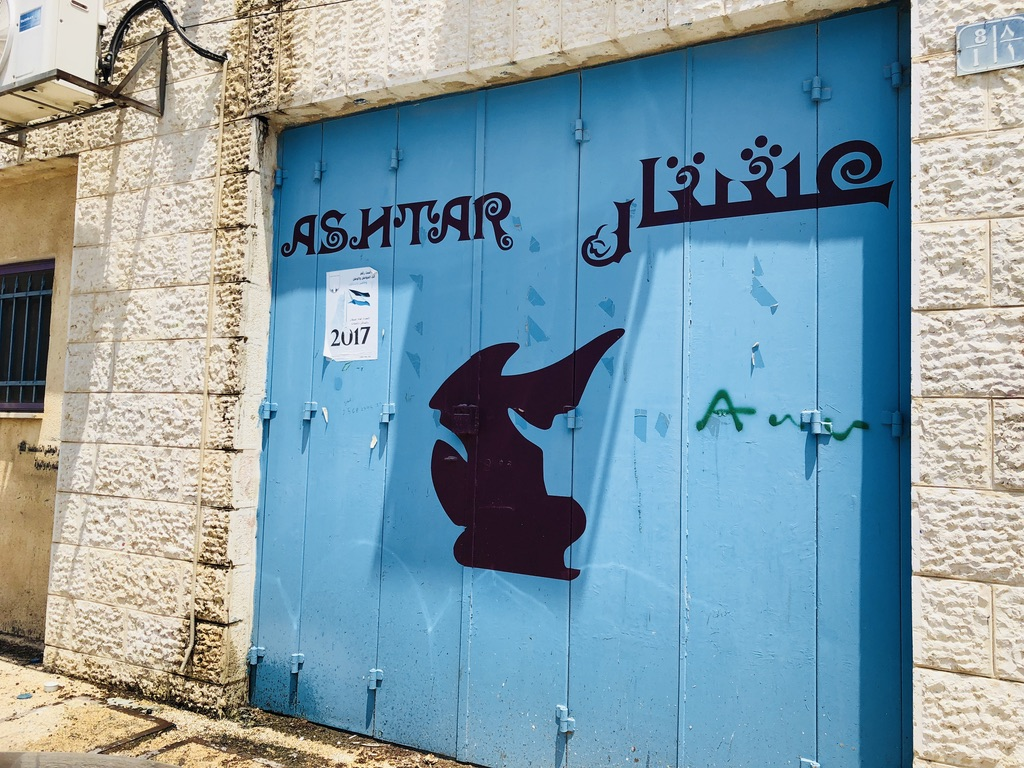
Ashtar Theatre

ASHTAR Theatre (or ASHTAR for Theatre Productions & Training) is a Palestinian non-governmental organization established in 1991 in Jerusalem by Palestinian actors Edward Muallem and Iman Aoun. It was the first theatre training organization for youth in Palestine.

ASHTAR Theatre, currently based in Ramallah,focuses on drama education, community engagement, and the production of theatrical works.

ASHTAR for Theatre Productions & Training is a member of the Palestinian Performing Arts Network. and of the Anna Lindh Foundation

== History ==
The collaboration between Iman Aoun (born 1963, Nablus) and Edward Muallem (born 1958 in Mi'ilya) began during their time at the El-Hakawati Theatre, formed in 1977 by Palestinian students from Israel and Franco-Palestinian artist François Gaspar, also known as Abou Salem.

ASHTAR Theatre was the first drama school in Palestine, offering young people acting techniques, physical theatre, and Theatre of the Oppressed professional trainings. It also promoted the first Theatre training program for school and university students in the West Bank. In 1993, the training program expanded to Gaza, and in 1995 ASHTAR Theatre was established in Ramallah.

Iman Aoun served as Artistic Director until 2021 when she was replaced by Edward Muallem.

== Work and Productions ==
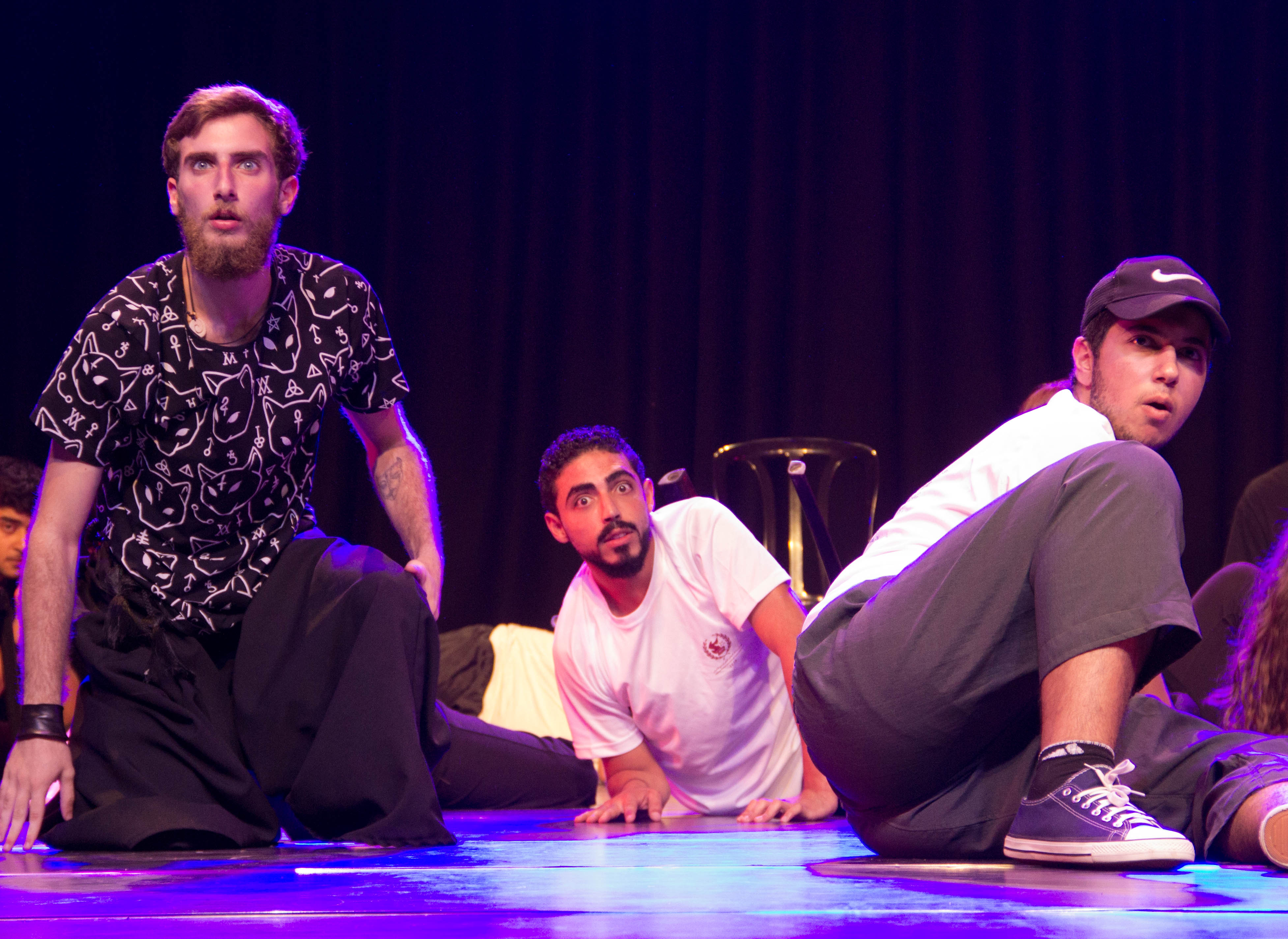
Ashtar Theatre Company Members

=== Professional Productions ===
ASHTAR's Professional Productions tour locally and internationally. Some of these productions are:

- Era of the Whales (2006) [Directed by Iman Aoun]
- I AM JERUSALEM (2010) [Written and Directed by Nasser Omar]
- Richard II (2012) [Directed by Conall Morrison]
- The Journey of Rida (2013) [Directed by Mohammad Eid]
- This Flesh is Mine (2014) [Written by Brian Woolland]
- Peer Gynt (2018) [Performed at the ASHTAR Theatre International Youth Festival]
- A Right Move (2018) [Performed at the ASHTAR Theatre International Youth Festival]
- Ventolin of return (2022). Written by Bayan Shbib
- 2077, who wants to survive. Written by Bayan Shbib and Directed by Simon Eifeler

=== Forum Theatre Productions ===
Forum Theatre, (one of the dynamics of the Theatre of the Oppressed' methodology by Augusto Boal) is part of ASHTAR Theatre community work. Some of these productions are:

- Your Health Concerns Us (2011) [Directed by Mohammad Eid]
- Al-Mahatta/Station (2012) [Directed by Iman Aoun]
- I Don't Know Where to Start (2013) [Directed by Edward Muallem]
- Al-Mahkama/A Court (2015) [Directed by Iman Aoun]
- Machine and Hammer (2016) [Directed by Edward Muallem]

=== Projects ===
==== The Gaza Monologues ====
The Gaza Monologues is a collection of testimonies written by ASHTAR Theatre's youth in 2010, reflecting their personal experiences during the intense violence of the Gaza Strip. These monologues, which capture the experiences of Gazans, shed light on the humanitarian consequences of the conflict. The project was initiated by ASHTAR Theatre as a response to the first Gaza War in 2010 and has since been presented worldwide in solidarity events.

The monologues have been translated into 18 languages and performed by over 1500 young people in over 80 cities across 40 countries, raising awareness of the humanitarian crisis in Gaza. In 2023, ASHTAR Theatre called on global theatre makers to participate in a reading of the monologues on November 29, the International Day of Solidarity with the Palestinian People.

==== The Syrian Monologues ====
The Syrian Monologues is a project initiated by ASHTAR Theatre to give a voice to Syrian refugees who have been displaced by the ongoing conflict. Beginning in 2014, the project aims to raise awareness about the plight of refugees by encouraging them to share their personal stories through monologues. The project began with ASHTAR Theatre working with Syrian refugees in Amman, Jordan, in collaboration with CARE Jordan. Here, 120 refugees participated in workshops, with 22 of them creating monologues that were later presented on World Refugee Day, June 9, 2015.

The project's scope expanded internationally, inviting theatre artists worldwide, to work with refugees in their respective countries. The goal was to help refugees from different age groups write and perform their monologues, which were translated and staged as performances, radio dramas, or dramatic plays. These performances were coordinated to be held simultaneously in multiple countries, with a major event in December 2016 aimed at engaging with the United Nations in Geneva.

The Syrian Monologues serves as both an artistic and humanitarian initiative, providing a platform for refugees to share their experiences of displacement, loss, and hope for a safe future. Through this project, ASHTAR Theatre aims to amplify the voices of refugees while also contributing to the cultural exchange among artists and communities worldwide.

=== Festivals ===
==== International Theatre of the Oppressed Festival ====
The Biennial International Theatre of the Oppressed Festival is a 2-5 week-long festival organised by ASHTAR Theatre. Launched in 2004, the festival features performances, masterclasses, workshops, discussions, webinars etc. Its director is Edward Muallem, the general director of ASHTAR Theatre.

==== ASHTAR International Youth Theatre Festival ====
The ASHTAR International Youth Theatre Festival (AIYTF) is the result of long years of cultural networking with the international theatre world. AIYTF, was first created in 2012, and is held annually.

== Recognition ==
- 1996 Cairo Experimental Theater Festival
  - Best Arab Theatre Play for Martyrs are coming back, directed by Sameh Hijazi
  - Best Actress Award for Iman Aoun in the play Martyrs are coming back
- 2006 Cairo Experimental Theater Festival,
  - Best Actress Award for Bayan Shbib in the play Safad Shatila & vice versa
