= Al-Qaskhun =

Storytelling profession in Iraq

Occupation
- Names: القصخون
- Occupation type: Traditional storyteller
- Activity sectors: Performing arts, oral tradition

Description
- Competencies: Public speaking, narrative performance, historical storytelling
- Education required: Abbasid Caliphate era
- Fields of employment: Coffeehouses, cultural centers
- Related jobs: Hakawati, Griot, Maqam performer

Al-Qaskhun (Arabic: القصخون, from the Persian compound قصه خون qesse khun "storyteller"), also known as al-Hakawati (Arabic: الحكواتي), is a historic occupation regarding a professional narrator that specializes in storytelling in Iraq, most notably Baghdad. These storytellers were notable for their emotional and engaging narration skills that kept their audiences engaged in their stories. The storytellers usually sat in Baghdadi coffeehouses and narrated various stories and folklore on benches. The profession is also associated with the popular One Thousand and One Nights and its main narrator Scheherazade.

== Description ==
Storytelling in Baghdad goes back to the Abbasid Caliphate period in which medieval Baghdad flourished and stored many scientists, poets, entertainers, and educated people. Among the entertainers and performers were storytellers who were publicly significant, usually standing in the minbar of a mosque to narrate stories, but were sometimes unwelcome by the intellectual leaderships due to being branded as "instigators of rebellion". As such, according to al-Tabari around 893 Abbasid Caliph al-Mu'tadid reportedly ordered that no storyteller would be allowed to sit on public roads or the main mosque of the city. Nevertheless, storytellers continued to play an important role in the daily lives of the Abbasid people while tackling social issues such as ones regarding the status of women.

By the late Ottoman period and the Kingdom of Iraq period, the occupation of al-Qaskhun was part of daily lives and led to the spread of coffeehouses throughout Baghdad. However, the occupation is currently considered endangered. The decline of the Qaskhun came after the frequent introduction of televisions and film in the 1960s. As of the 21st century, Dar al-Atraqchi remains one of the only coffeehouses where the occupation is practiced with Mahmoud Abu Tahseen Hussein, who started his job in 1975, narrating stories every Ramadan night. In Mosul, Qaskhun Abd al-Wahed Isma'il has become popular in the city's remaining coffeehouses after the 2016 events of the Battle of Mosul due to his historical stories about the city's heritage.

The Shabandar Café has also been historically frequented by people practicing the Qaskhun occupation alongside Iraqi Maqamists.

== In pop culture ==
In Neil Gaiman's "Ramadan" published in the DC Comic Book Sandman which shows Baghdad in the time of Harun al-Rashid, storytelling and storytellers play a significant part in showcasing the city's culture.

== See also ==
- Meddah, the Turkish equivalent of a Qaskhun -- a professional storyteller who performs in venues such as coffeehouses, and is a feature of traditional coffeehouse culture.
- Griot
- Gusans
- Oral storytelling
- Pingshu
- Halqa
- Ashik
