= Meddah =

Turkish storyteller

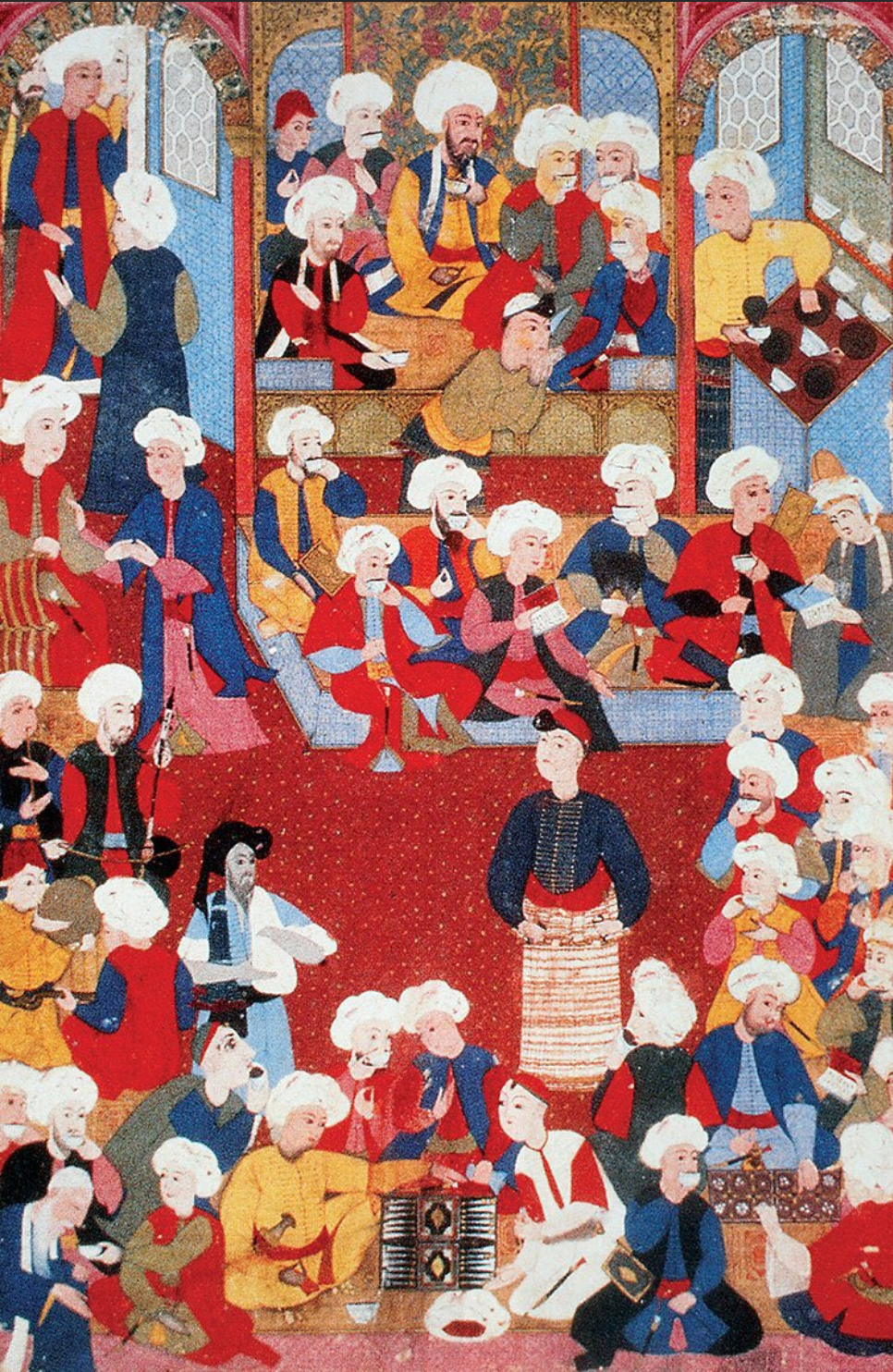
Ottoman miniature of a Meddah performing at a coffeehouse

Meddah is the name given to a traditional Turkish storyteller, who played in front of a small group of viewers, such as a coffeehouse audience. This form of performance was especially popular in the Ottoman Empire from the 16th century onwards. The play was generally about a single topic, the meddah playing different characters, and was usually introduced by drawing attention to the moral contained in the story. The meddah would use props such as an umbrella, a handkerchief, or different headwear, to signal a change of character, and was skilled at manipulating his voice and imitating different dialects. There was no time limitation on the shows; a good meddah had the skill to adjust the story depending on interaction with the audience.

== Overview ==
Meddahs were generally traveling artists whose route took them from one large city to another, such along the towns of the spice road; the tradition supposedly goes back to Homer's time. The methods of meddahs were the same as the methods of the itinerant storytellers who related Greek epics such as the Iliad and Odyssey, even though the main stories were now Ferhat ile Şirin or Layla and Majnun. The repertoires of the meddahs also included true stories, modified depending on the audience, artist and political situation.

The Istanbul meddahs were known to integrate musical instruments into their stories: this was a main difference between them and the East Anatolian Dengbêjin.

In 2008 the art of the meddahs was relisted in the Representative List of the Intangible Cultural Heritage of Humanity.

== History ==
The meddah originally started as the narrators of religious and heroic tales, having its roots in the tradition of Turkish oral literature. Whilst strongly based on Turkish nomadic and shamanist traditions brought from Central Asia rather than external influences, Turkish story-telling was influenced by the Arabic and Persian traditions by the 11th-13th centuries to become a form of one-man theatre. These narrators of mainly epic tales were known as kıssahan, with their stories containing strong Islamic elements that reinforced the faith of the Muslims in the audience and attempting to convert the non-Muslims. Such kıssahan existed during the Seljuq period and usually told Arabic and Persian epics, stories of Ali and Hamza, as well as tales from One Thousand and One Nights. These stories expanded over time to include stories such as Battal Gazi.

The tradition of kıssahan continued into the Ottoman period, as evidenced by the documentation of a kıssahan working in the royal palace named Mustafa during the reign of Mehmed II. In time, all story-tellers became known as meddah and their stories became more and more secular. They began to imitate animals and make innuendos to attract the attention of the audiences. According to a scholar, this occurred "when the Mohammeddan clergy forbade any reference to the saints in the plays". As such, the performances by the meddah became theatrical acts based on satire: their themes included heroic tales as well as occurrences of daily life; humorous anecdotes, mimicry of stereotypes and familiar people, "mockery of social mores" and criticism of officials, at times even the sultan, became the quintessence of their plays.

Between the 16th and the 18th centuries, the meddah increased their influence in the society. The story told in Lord Byron's poem The Giaour originated as having been "by accident recited by one of the coffee-house story-tellers who abound in the Levant, and sing or recite their narratives", i.e., a meddah.The Giaour, A Fragment of a Turkish Tale. London: John Murray. 1813. p. 41. They remained popular into the 20th century. However, the tradition of the meddah ended by the middle of the 20th century, with Sururi, active until the 1930s, being considered the last representative of this form of art. Whilst traditional story-telling weakened in Turkish society, the little function the meddah had was taken up by the ashik.

== See also ==
- Al-Qaskhun, Arabic/Persian equivalent of a meddah -- a professional storyteller who performs in venues such as coffeehouses, and is a feature of traditional coffeehouse culture.
- Ashik
- Griot
- Halqa
- Gusans
- Naqqali
