= Rain song =

Rain song refers to:

- Rain song, songs sung during rainmaking rituals (eg. Rain Queen#Rain song)
- RainSong, a US-based acoustic guitar manufacturer
- Rain Song (al-Sayyab), Arabic poetry collection and the title poem by Iraqi poet al-Sayyab, 1960
- "The Rain Song", a song by the rock band Led Zeppelin
- "Rain Song", a 2000 song by Japanese musician Taiji
- "Rain Song", a 2021 song from the soundtrack to Minari by Emile Mosseri

== See also ==
- Rain dancing, a ceremony to ensure seasonal rains vital to the harvest
- Rain (disambiguation)#Songs
