= Badr Shakir al-Sayyab =

Iraqi poet (1926–1964)

- بدر شاكر السياب
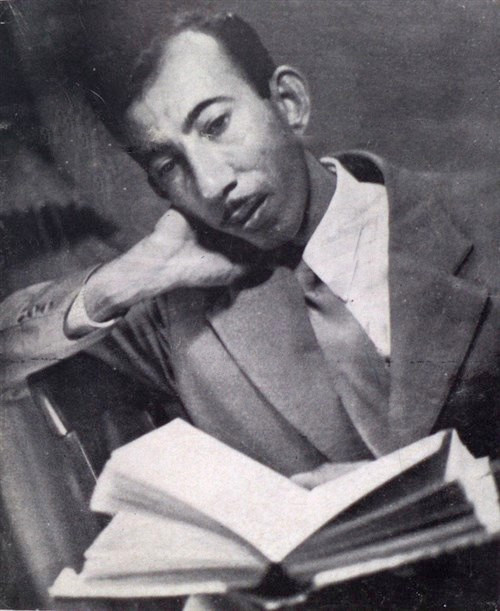
- Badr Shakir al-Sayyab
- Born: 24 December 1926; Jaykur, near Basra, Mandatory Iraq
- Died: 24 December 1964 (aged 38); Kuwait
- Resting place: Iraq
- Education: Higher Teacher Training College, Baghdad (1948)
- Known for: Poet

Badr Shakir al-Sayyab (Arabic: بدر شاكر السياب) (December 24, 1926 in Jaykur, Basra – December 24, 1964 in Kuwait) was an Iraqi poet, regarded as one of the most important contemporary Arab poets. Alongside Nazik Al Malaika, he is considered one of the founders of Arab free-verse poetry.

== Early life and career ==
Badr Shakir al-Sayyab was born in Jaykur, a town south of Basra, the eldest child of a date grower and shepherd. His mother died when he was six years old. He graduated from the Higher Teacher Training College of Baghdad in 1948 but was later dismissed from his teaching position for being a member of the Iraqi Communist Party.

Banned from teaching because of his political views, he next found employment as a taster, working for the Iraqi Date Company in Basra. However, he soon returned to Baghdad, where he worked as a security guard for a road paving company. He was actively involved in the 1952 Iraqi Intifada, in which he joined his fellow workers in sacking the offices of the US Information Service, climbed up an electricity pole and declaimed a revolutionary poem he had composed the previous night. The government instituted a campaign of repression against Communist sympathizers in the wake of the uprising, and al-Sayyab feared that he would be arrested. He decided to flee the country, obtained a false Iranian passport under the assumed name of Ali Artink, and escaped over the border to Iran. From Abadan he then sailed to Kuwait in 1953. This journey was the subject of his poem 'An Escape' (Farar).

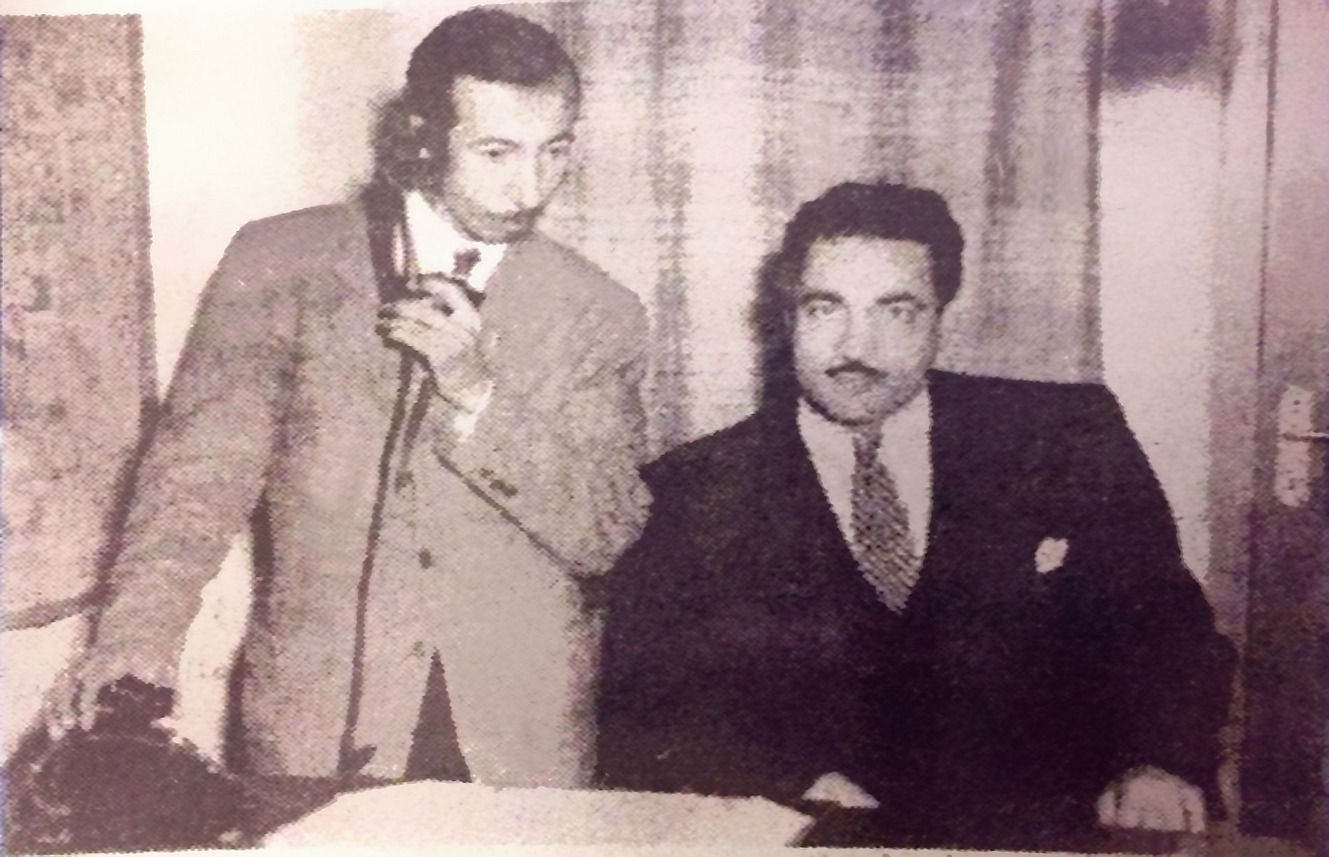
Al-Sayyab (left) with Iraqi artist Nuri al-Rawi (right), 1956.

He worked for a while at the Kuwait Electricity Company, but in 1954 he returned to Iraq and severed all his links with the Communist Party. He was therefore allowed to work in the Iraqi public service again, and given a job in the General Directorate for Import and Export. However after the 14 July Revolution he wrote poetry critical of the new head of state Abd al-Karim Qasim, and was therefore dismissed from his post once again in April 1959. Following the 1959 Kirkuk massacre he became outspokenly anti-Communist and published a series of essays called ‘Kuntu shiyū‘iyyan’ (‘I was a Communist').

In 1957 the Syrian poet Adunis and the Lebanese poet Yusuf al-Khal began publishing a new magazine, Majallat Shi'r ('Poetry Magazine') in Beirut. Sayyab began writing for it and this brought him into contact with other writers in their circle, including Ounsi el-Hajj, and Khalil Hawi. In 1960 Sayyab visited Beirut to publish a collection of his poetry, and won first prize (1000 Lebanese pounds) in a competition run by Majallat Shi'r for his collection Onshudat al-Matar (The Rain Song) which was later to become among his most widely acclaimed works.

== Illness and death ==
Returning to Iraq, al-Sayyab was given a job at the Iraqi Ports Authority and moved to Basra. However, he was arrested again on 4 February 1961 and held until 20 February. By this time his political stance and rising literary fame had brought him to the attention of the Congress for Cultural Freedom, which invited him to attend a conference entitled 'The Arab Writer and the Modern World’ in Rome. In the same year, his health began to deteriorate. In April 1962 he was admitted to the American University Hospital in Beirut, and his literary friends, including Yusuf Al-Khal, paid his fees. On his return to Basra in September 1962 the Congress for Cultural Freedom provided ongoing financial assistance to him and arranged for him to go to London to seek medical advice.

At the end of 1962, al-Sayyab travelled to the United Kingdom. Professor Albert Hourani had managed to grant him a fellowship at Durham University and he also thought about registering as a student at Oxford University to undertake a PhD, but was not able to do so. Admitted to St Mary's Hospital, London his illness was finally diagnosed as amyotrophic lateral sclerosis From London he went to Paris for a week in March 1963, where his diagnosis was confirmed.

In February 1964 his already poor health took a sudden turn for the worse, and he was taken into the Basra Port Hospital with double pneumonia, heart problems and an ulcer. As his treatment continued beyond what he could afford, the Society of Iraqi Authors and Writers, of which he was a member, secured the agreement of the Ministry of Health to continue caring for him. Eventually the Kuwaiti poet Ali Al-Sabti persuaded the Kuwaiti government to take over his treatment, and he was moved to the Amiri Hospital in Kuwait on 6 July 1964. While being treated there, he published a number of poems in the magazine Al-Ra'ed al-'Arabi ('The Arab Pioneer'). He died in the hospital on 24 December 1964.

== Legacy ==
Badr Shakir al-Seiab's experiments helped to change the course of modern Arabic poetry. He produced seven collections of poetry and several translations, which include the poetry of Louis Aragon, Nazim Hikmet, and Edith Sitwell, who, with T. S. Eliot, had a profound influence on him. At the end of the 1940s he launched the free verse movement in Arabic poetry, with fellow Iraqi poet Nazik al-Mala'ika, Abd al-Wahhab Al-Bayati and Shathel Taqa, giving it credibility with the many fine poems he published in the fifties. The publication of his third volume, Rain Song, in 1960 was one of the most significant events in contemporary Arabic poetry, instrumental in drawing attention to the use of myth in poetry. He revolutionized every element of the poem and wrote on highly involved political and social topics, as well as many personal themes. The Palestinian poet Mahmoud Darwish was greatly impressed and influenced by the poetry of Badr Shakir al-Sayyab. Al-Sayyab’s rooms, with his poems that are full of longing for the homeland after his exile from it. The poet was very interested in the smallest details of Iraq and its parts. He was in a constant eagerness and longing for everything related to the homeland that he was forced to leave, and this is clear in the poem. This is a brief will in which he wished to find a grave. In his homeland when he died, but when he lived he wanted nothing but a small hut in his fields, pointing to the blessings that he would bestow upon Iraq through a letter addressed to his people, recommending it to his people. In it, he forbade them from denying blessings, and commanded them to adhere to it and not accept anything other than it, regardless of what...

They enjoy blessings from which he was deprived, and he spent his life seeking them. Then he concludes his poem by pointing out the rights of the homeland over its children. It is sufficient that he was created from his own soil and manna; So that this would be a sufficient reason for gratitude for the blessings, and eternal nostalgia and burning longing for Him.

In the realm of literary controversy, Sayyab stated that Nazik al-Malaikah's claim to have discovered free verse herself was false, and drew attention to the earlier work of Ali Ahmad Bakathir (1910–69) who had developed the two-hemistich format in the mid 1930s. It was Bakathir in fact who had written fractured (caesura) poetry for the first time in Arabic poetry. Bakathir (1910–69), in the second edition of his book "Akhnatun wa Nefertiti", acknowledged the recognition Sayyab had brought him.

In 2014, some of Sayyab's works were banned from the Riyadh International Book Fair by the Saudi authorities.

Just like many well-known and modern Iraqi figures, one of the tables in the Dar al-Atraqchi Café in Baghdad was named after him in his honor.

== Poetry ==
- Christ After Crucifixion (المسيح بعد الصلب)
- Wilting Flowers (أزهار ذابلة, 1947)
- Hurricanes (أعاصير, 1948)
- Flowers and myths (أزهار وأساطير, 1950)
- Dawn of Peace (فجر السلام, 1951)
- The Grave Digger (Long Poem) (حفار القبور, 1952)
- The Blind Prostitute (المومس العمياء, 1954)
- Weapons and Children (الأسلحة والأطفال, 1955)
- Rain Song (انشودة المطر, 1960)
- The Drowned Temple (1962, المعبد الغريق)
- Alaguenan^{?} Home (1963, منزل الأقنان)
- The Balcony of the Nobleman's Daughter (1964, شناشيل ابنة الجلبي)

== See also ==
- List of Iraqi artists

== Suggested reading ==
- Abbas, Ihsan "Badr Shaker Al-Sayyab’s book, A Study of His Life and Poetry"
- Placing the Poet: Badr Shakir Al-Sayyab and Postcolonial Iraq by Terri DeYoung State University of New York Press (31 May 1998) ISBN 0-7914-3732-9
- The Poetry of B.S. Al-Sayyab: Myth and the Influence of T.S. Eliot
- Reading T.S. Eliot in Arabic: A Talk with Ghareeb Iskander. ArabLit Quarterly, October 17, 2020
