= Jaykur =

Coordinates: 30°27′21″N 48°00′32″E

Jaykur جيكور
- Jaykur
- Interactive map of Jaykur

Jaykur (Arabic: جيكور) is an Iraqi village located southeast of Basra, belonging to the Abi Al-Khasib district. The area of Jaykur is 19.4 Iraqi dunams.

The Iraqi poet Badr Shakir al-Sayyab was from the village of Jaykur, and he often sang about it in his poems and immortalized it in his poems, which have been translated into many languages.
