= Dar al-Atraqchi Café =

Heritage site in Baghdad, Iraq

- Arabic: مقهى الأطرقجي
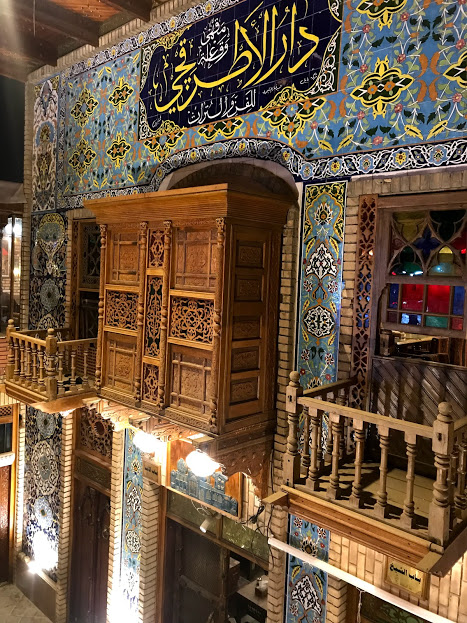

General information
- Status: Active
- Architectural style: Baghdadi architecture
- Location: Baghdad, Iraq
- Opened: 2013

Dar al-Atraqchi Café (Arabic: مقهى الأطرقجي) is a heritage café located in Baghdad, Iraq. The café is known for preserving the old Baghdadi atmosphere that modern cafes in the city ignore. It contains preserved antiquities and artifacts that were used in old Baghdadi homes, in addition to Arabian-style drawings and decorations on the walls and doors of the café. The café is also famous for organizing antique trade auctions which are famous with merchants.

== Background ==
The café was opened in 2013 and was built in traditional Baghdadi architecture. The owner of the café, Abd al-Razzaq al-Atraqchi, wanted to make a traditional Baghdadi café as well as create a house for old preserved antiques even as the antique trade in Baghdad started to decline after 2003 due to the Iraq War. The decision was made to display aspects of Baghdadi heritage in order to preserve them and introduce them to foreign tourists. The café gets its name from the Iraqi Arabic word "al-Atraqchi" which is a laqab given to anyone who traded carpets and mattresses in Iraq. Abd al-Razzaq has stated that part of the reason for opening the café came from the al-Atraqchi profession that goes back to his ancestors' work.

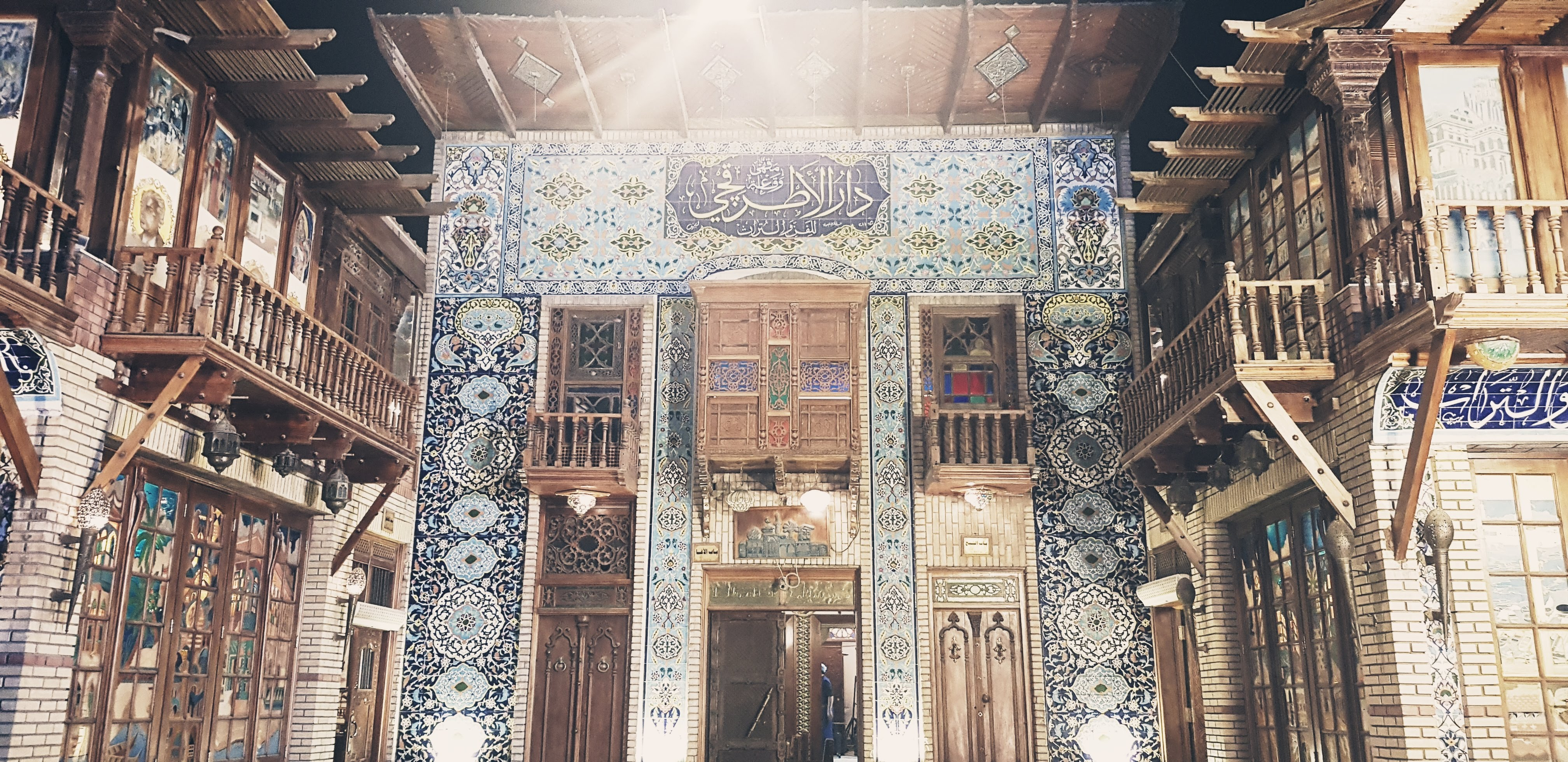
The building's exterior.

The work companion of Abd al-Razzaq, Sa'ad Salloum Abu Samer, also stated that the reason for the demand for frequenting the café while it serves tea, coffee, and hookah is because they are tired of modernity, western decorations, and loud bright lights, and have instead resorted to the calm atmosphere that the café provides them, as well as the old Baghdadi atmosphere which has become rare in recent years. Due to the popularity of the café, it has other locations around Baghdad.

== Description ==
Dar al-Atraqchi lacks a table numbering system. Instead, it has been replaced by naming each table with the name of one of Iraq's artistic, literary, and political figures and pioneers. Among those figures are Ali Al-Wardi, Badr Shakir al-Sayyab, and Abd al-Razzaq al-Hasani. The café provides its visitors with singing performances every evening that include Iraqi maqam and traditional songs. The café is also well known for being the last of its kind that still holds nights where the profession of "al-Qaskhun" is practiced where every night of Ramadan. A professional Baghdadi storyteller is brought to tell tales the storyteller memorized to an audience.

== See also ==
- Café culture of Baghdad
