= An Enemy of the People =

1882 play by Henrik Ibsen

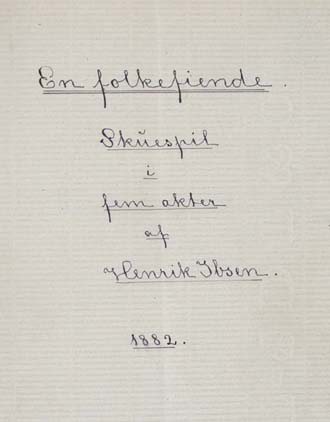
- Original manuscript cover page, 1882
- Original title: En folkefiende
- Original language: Norwegian
- Written by: Henrik Ibsen

Premiere
- Date: 1883

An Enemy of the People (Norwegian: En folkefiende) is an 1882 play by Norwegian playwright Henrik Ibsen that explores the conflict between personal integrity and societal norms. The play centers on Dr. Thomas Stockmann, who discovers a serious contamination issue in his town's new spas, endangering public health. His courageous decision to expose this truth brings severe backlash from local leaders, including his brother Peter Stockmann, who is a powerful political figure in the town.

Set against the backdrop of a community grappling with economic and environmental concerns, the play highlights the often harsh consequences faced by those who challenge established systems. Ibsen’s depiction of this struggle emphasizes the tension between truth and expediency. The character of Peter Stockmann is based on Ibsen’s own uncle, Christian Cornelius Paus, whose political influence and authoritative role in Ibsen's hometown of Skien parallel those of Peter in the play. Ibsen himself was uncertain about the play's classification, noting in a letter to his publisher that it contained both comedic and serious elements, reflecting his complex view of the protagonist's moral stance. This exploration of moral and societal conflict follows Ibsen’s earlier work, Ghosts, which faced similar criticism for its bold critique of societal norms.

== Plot overview ==
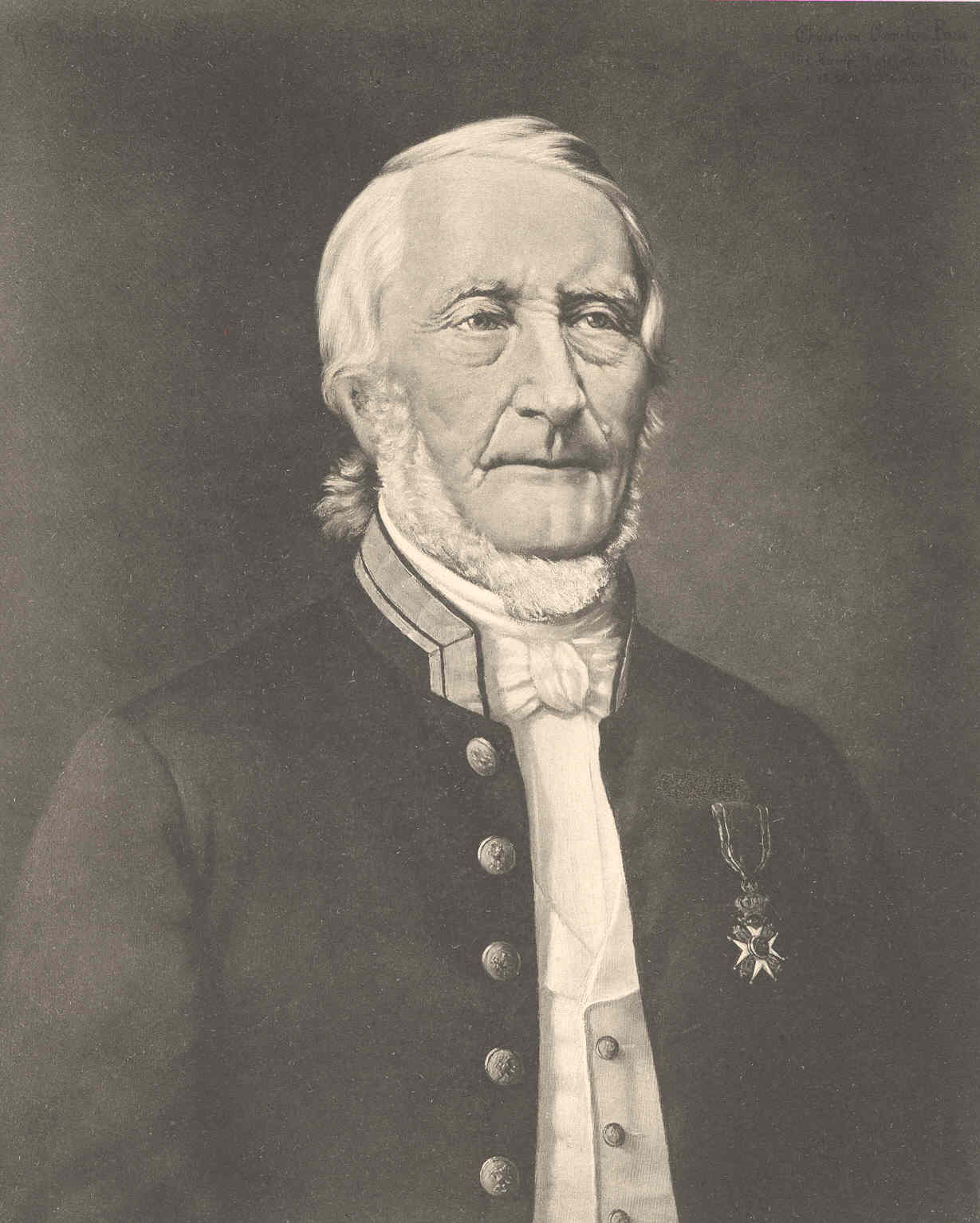
Christian Cornelius Paus, Ibsen's uncle, was the inspiration for Peter Stockmann.

=== Act I ===
Dr. Thomas Stockmann is the medical officer of a recently opened spa in a small town. The play begins with a dinner party hosted by Dr. Stockmann and his wife, Katrine. The dinner guests include Dr. Stockmann's brother Peter (the mayor) and Hovstad (the editor of the newspaper). Peter asks Stockmann about a rumor that Hovstad is about to print an article the doctor wrote regarding the spa baths. Dr. Stockmann is evasive about the nature of this article, and Peter leaves. Petra, Dr. Stockmann's daughter, brings in a letter containing laboratory test results confirming Dr. Stockmann's suspicions that the spa water is contaminated with bacteria, and Hovstad agrees to print Dr. Stockmann's article, although revealing the truth may force the baths to shut down, with negative repercussions for the town's economy. Dr. Stockmann has mixed reactions to these events, but ultimately rejoices about preventing the harm that the contaminated water would have caused.

=== Act II ===
The next morning, Morten Kiil, Dr. Stockmann's father-in-law, stops by to congratulate him on what Kiil believes is an elaborate prank, since Kiil thinks the notion that the baths are tainted is too ridiculous to be believed, especially not by the mayor. Hovstad and the printer Aslaksen visit to reinforce their commitment to the doctor and extend their gratitude; the newspaper wants to confront the government of the town and expose its corruption, and this opportunity is a good start.

Peter arrives and tells Dr. Stockmann that if he selfishly proceeds to publish this article, he will be partially culpable for the town's ruin. Peter urges Dr. Stockmann to think of the bigger picture, retract the article, and solve the problem in a quieter way. Dr. Stockmann refuses; Peter warns of terrible consequences for his family and him.

=== Act III ===
In the newspaper office, Hovstad and the subeditor, Billing, discuss the pros and cons of running Dr. Stockmann's article. Dr. Stockmann arrives and tells them to print the article, but they begin questioning how valuable it is to expose the government in this way, concluding that printing this article will do more harm than good, because of its likely effect on the town's economy. Peter Stockmann appears with a statement of his own, intended to reassure the public about the safety of the spa baths, and the newspaper agrees to print it. Desperate, Dr. Stockmann decides that he does not need the paper to print anything and that he can fight this battle on his own. He decides to call a town meeting and spread the information that way. Although Katrine Stockmann realizes that her husband is risking his reputation, she stands by him.

=== Act IV ===
At a town meeting in Captain Horster's house, Dr. Stockmann is about to read his water report to the townspeople. Billing, the family, the mayor, Aslaksen, and Hovstad are there. Aslaksen, a respected citizen, is elected chairman of the meeting. Permission for Dr. Stockmann's being allowed to speak is about to be voted on, when Dr. Stockmann says he has a different subject. He then winds up into a passionate oration about social evolution. He says that new, truthful ideas are always condemned, due to the "colossal stupidity of the authorities" and the small-mindedness of "the compact liberal majority" of the people, who may as well "be exterminated." The audience feels insulted by these accusations and anger rises. By the end of the meeting, the audience has rebelled, repeatedly shouting, "He is an enemy of the people!" Dr. Stockmann tells his father-in-law, Kiil, that his tannery is what is leaking most of the poisons into the baths. As the crowd is leaving, voices are heard threatening to break Stockmann's windows.

=== Act V ===
By the next morning, Dr. Stockmann's house, especially his study, has been badly damaged, for the town has turned against his family and him. The landlord is evicting them from their house; Petra has been fired from her job as a schoolteacher for having progressive opinions. Peter comes to the house with a letter from the board of directors of the baths that terminates his contract, along with a resolution from the homeowners' association stating that no one should hire Dr. Stockmann in this town again.

Dr. Stockmann's father-in-law, Morton Kiil, arrives to say that he has just bought shares in the baths with the money that he had intended to leave to his daughter and grandchildren. Kiil expects this will cause his son-in-law to stop his crusade, to ensure that the spa does not go bankrupt, and his family will have a secure future. Dr. Stockmann rebuffs Kiil's threat and also ignores Peter's advice to leave town for a few months. Katrine tells Dr. Stockmann she is afraid that the people will drive him out of town. Dr. Stockmann replies, though, that he intends to stay and make them understand "that considerations of expediency turn morality and justice upside down." He ends by proclaiming himself the strongest man in town because he is able to stand alone.

== Characters ==
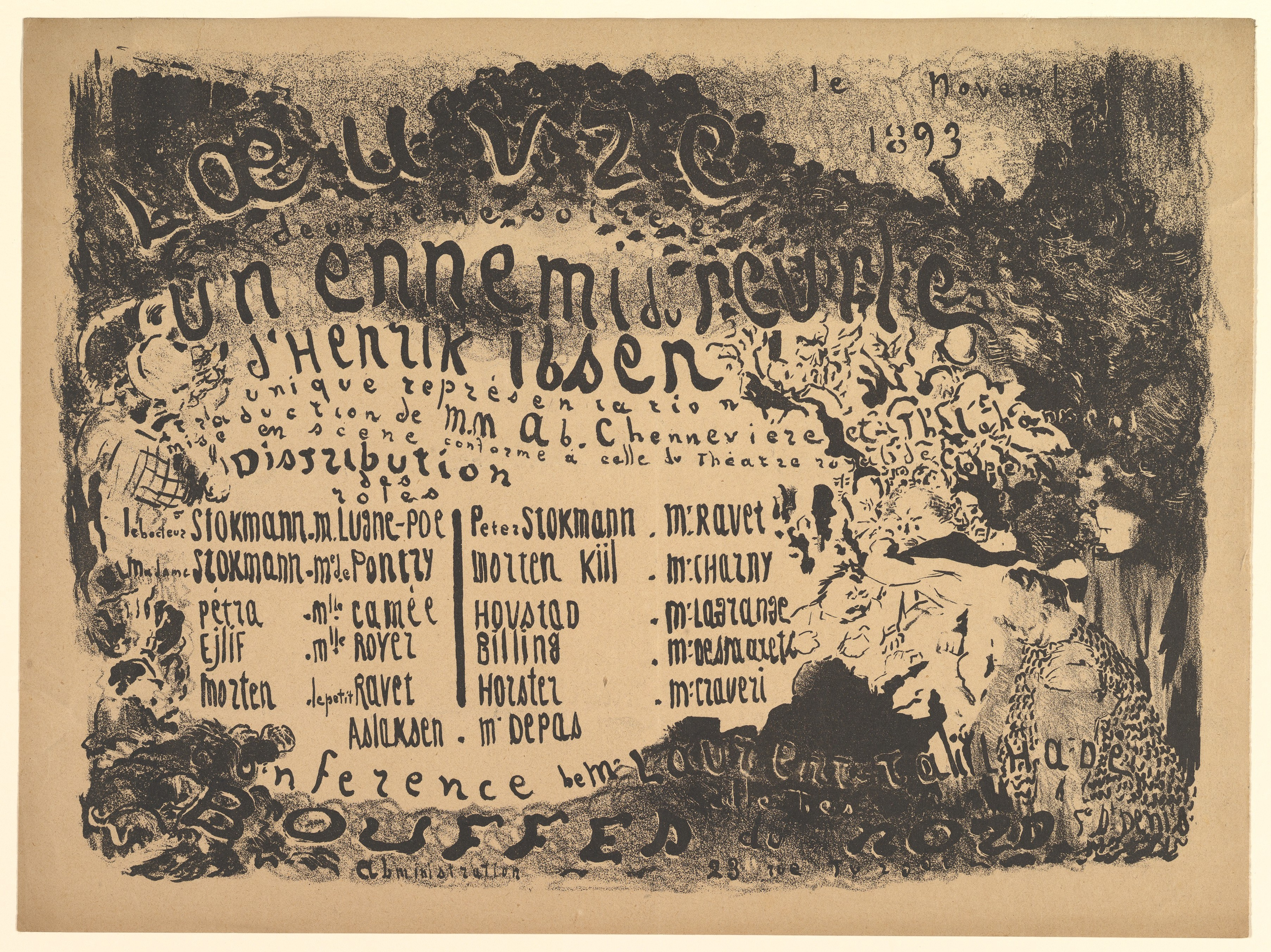
Édouard Vuillard, An Enemy of the People program for Théâtre de l'Œuvre, November 1893

- Doctor Thomas Stockmann, the medical officer at the new Municipal Baths and the protagonist
- Mrs. Katherine Stockmann, his wife
- Petra, their daughter, a teacher
- Ejlif and Morten, their sons
- Peter Stockmann, Doctor Stockmann's elder brother, is the mayor of the town, thus Thomas' supervisor. He is based on Christian Cornelius Paus, Ibsen's uncle.
- Morten Kiil, a tanner (Mrs. Stockmann's father), also known as the Badger
- Hovstad, editor of The Peoples' Messenger, the local paper
- Billing, subeditor
- Captain Horster, a shipmaster going to America and a friend of Thomas Stockmann's
- Aslaksen, a publisher (also a character in The League of Youth)
- Men of various conditions and occupations, a few women, and a troop of schoolboys – the audience at a public meeting

== Themes ==
In An Enemy of the People, speaking the language of comic exaggeration through the mouth of his spokesman, the idealist Doctor Thomas Stockmann, Ibsen puts into very literal terms the theme of the play: It is true that ideas grow stale and platitudinous, but one may go one step further and say flatly that truths die. According to Stockmann, there are no absolute principles of either wisdom or morality. In this Ibsen is referring indirectly to the reception of his previous plays. For example, the commandment "honor thy father and thy mother" referred to in Ghosts is not simply either true or false. It may have been a truth once and a falsehood today. As Stockmann states in his excited harangue to his political enemies:

Truths are by no means the wiry Methuselahs some people think them. A normally constituted truth lives—let us say—as a rule, seventeen or eighteen years; at the outside twenty; very seldom more. And truths so patriarchal as that are always shockingly emaciated.

Yet, Ibsen addresses in an engaging manner a number of challenges that remain highly relevant today, such as environmental issues (versus economic interests), professional responsibilities (of experts in policy debates), and the moral dilemmas and tensions involved in whistle blowing.

== Background ==
As in any other plays, Ibsen derived names and traits from his relatives, including the name Stockmann, a real family in Telemark from which Ibsen himself was descended; Ibsen was also born in Stockmanngaarden in Skien. Peter Stockmann, who in the Norwegian original holds the offices of byfoged (city judge/magistrate) and politimester (chief of police), was based on Ibsen's uncle, Christian Cornelius Paus, who held the same two offices in Skien and who was also a descendant of the Stockmann family. In Dr. Stockmann's "buttoned-up brother, the magistrate, who sticks to tea and advocates moderation and respect for society's laws," the parallel to the magistrate Paus becomes almost too obvious, writes Ibsen scholar Jon Nygaard.

== Reception ==
The play has gained renewed attention in the aftermath of the COVID-19 pandemic.

=== Critical reviews ===
Scottish drama critic William Archer, an early and contemporary advocate of Ibsen's plays, said the play was less sensational than some of Ibsen's earlier efforts, but was a strong drama with excellent dialogue and characters.

== Accolades ==
=== 1988 West End production ===
Year	Award	Category	Nominee	Result	Ref.
1988	Laurence Olivier Awards	Actor of the Year in a Revival	Tom Wilkinson	Nominated	
1988	Laurence Olivier Awards	Best Director	David Thacker	Nominated	
1988	Laurence Olivier Awards	Award for Outstanding Achievement		Nominated	

=== 2024 West End production ===
Year	Award	Category	Nominee	Result	Ref.
2024	Laurence Olivier Awards	Best Actor in a Supporting Role	Paul Hilton	Nominated	
2024	Laurence Olivier Awards	Best Actress in a Supporting Role	Priyanga Burford	Nominated	

=== 2024 Broadway production ===
Year	Award	Category	Nominee	Result	Ref.
2024	Tony Awards	Best Revival of a Play	Amy Herzog	Nominated	
2024	Tony Awards	Best Actor in a Play	Jeremy Strong	Won	
2024	Tony Awards	Best Scenic Design of a Play	dots	Nominated	
2024	Tony Awards	Best Costume Design of a Play	David Zinn	Nominated	
2024	Tony Awards	Best Lighting Design of a Play	Isabella Byrd	Nominated	
2024	Drama Desk Awards	Outstanding Adaptation	Amy Herzog	Nominated	
2024	Drama League Awards	Outstanding Revival of a Play		Nominated	
2024	Drama League Awards	Distinguished Performance	Jeremy Strong	Nominated	
2024	Drama League Awards	Distinguished Performance	Caleb Eberhardt	Nominated	
2024	Drama League Awards	Outstanding Direction of a Play	Sam Gold	Nominated	
2024	Outer Critics Circle Awards	Outstanding Revival of a Play		Nominated	
2024	Outer Critics Circle Awards	Outstanding Lead Performer in a Broadway Play	Jeremy Strong	Nominated	
2024	Theatre World Award		Michael Imperioli	Won	

== Adaptations ==
A Nazi adaptation of the play was Hans Steinhoff's 1937 film Ein Volksfeind.

This classic play was adapted by Arthur Miller in the 1950s in a production that opened at the Broadhurst Theater on December 28, 1950. It starred Academy Award winner Fredric March and his wife Florence Eldridge as well as Morris Carnovsky; future Oscar winner Rod Steiger was a "townsperson." Miller's adaptation was presented on National Educational Television in 1966, in a production starring James Daly. It was also made into a movie of the same name in 1978, starring Steve McQueen. The BBC then cast Robert Urquhart as "Tom Stockman" in their 1980 TV version, adapting the story and the cast names to reflect it now being set in a Scottish town. In the creation of his adaptation of Ibsen's work, several changes were made by Miller to make the play more accessible and accepting to a 1950s audience, as opposed to Ibsen's late 1800s audience. Many major edits not only included the transformation of speech and language, but changes were made to the character of Dr. Stockmann to avoid having him champion eugenics. Throughout the play, Dr. Stockmann acts as a Christ figure. Miller found it necessary therefore to change Ibsen's use of genetic and racial theories from the late 1800s to further Dr. Stockmann's standing as a champion of the lower classes as opposed to a scientist with a belief in racial determinism and the importance of eugenics for "improving" people. For example, in Ibsen's original, a portion of Dr. Stockmann's speech to the people contained:

The masses are nothing but the raw material that must be fashioned into the people. Is it not so with all other living creatures on earth? How great the difference between a cultivated and an uncultivated breed of animals!... Don't you believe that the brain of a poodle has developed quite differently from that of a mongrel? Yes, you may depend upon that! It is educated poodles like this that jugglers train to perform the most extraordinary tricks. A common peasant-cur could never learn anything of the sort—not if he tried till Doomsday... we are animals... there is a terrible difference between men-poodles and men-mongrels.

— Dr. Stockmann, quoted in Bigsby (141)

In Miller's adaptation, no such eugenics-positive screed is read. Miller keeps Dr. Stockmann's ideals as a character, and his dedication to facing down the hypocrisy of the aristocracy and governmental bureaucrats, but portrays him as more of a democratic thinker and socialist, while retaining some of the original character's ideas about the evolution of animals and humans, and the need to cultivate humane qualities in order to bring the masses to a more rational and educated level, so that they can fully participate in a democracy. In Miller's adaptation, part of the doctor's speech reads:

I put in a good many years in the north of our country. Up there the rulers of the world are the great seal and the gigantic squadrons of duck. Man lives on ice, huddled together in little piles of stones. His whole life consists of grubbing for food. Nothing more. He can barely speak his own language. And it came to me one day that it was romantic and sentimental for a man of my education to be tending these people. They had not yet reached the stage where they needed a doctor. If the truth were to be told, a veterinary would be more in order.

— Dr. Stockmann, Arthur Miller (93)

A version was produced for Australian television in 1958.

The 1972 Greek film O ehthros tou laou (An Enemy of the People) is an adaptation of the play, taking place in Greece during the mid-1930s.

A BBC adaptation of EOTP was made in 1977 and aired in February 1980. Set in contemporary small-town Scotland, it can be found on BBC iplayer.

The play was the indirect inspiration for the blockbuster movie Jaws.

Satyajit Ray's 1989 film Ganashatru was based on this play. In 1990, PBS produced the play for their show American Playhouse, starring William Anton and John Glover.

In 2000 an adaptation of the play called Paragon Springs written by Steven Dietz premiered at Milwaukee Repertory theatre in Milwaukee Wisconsin, U.S.A. The play is set in "a small town in the American Midwest" in 1926.

An Enemy of the People (with the subtitle The strongest one is the one who stands alone), a Norwegian film released in 2004 and directed by Erik Skjoldbjærg, is an adaptation of Ibsen's play.

In 2007 Ouriel Zohar's troupe Compagnie Ouriel Zohar performed an adaptation for two actors only of An Enemy of the People, performed first in Paris, then Fréjus, Besançon (2008), Liège, Minsk, Valleyfield (Canada, 2009), and Porto Heli (Greece, 2010).

In early 2013, a stage adaptation entitled "عدو الشعب" (Arabic: Enemy of the people or A Public Enemy) was organized and directed by Nora Amin (who played Doctor Stockmann's wife, with Tarek El-Dewiri as Doctor Stockmann) in Cairo. It was translated into colloquial Arabic and featured a rock-themed soundtrack played live on-set. Jointly sponsored by the Norwegian Embassy in Cairo and the Ibsen Studies Center in Norway, it received various positive reviews at a time when Egypt was plunged into deep political turmoil.

A new adaptation by Robert Falls, based on a 19th-century translation by Eleanor Marx, was staged at Chicago's Goodman Theatre from March - April 2018.

In Autumn 2021, a new National Theatre of Scotland adaptation entitled simply Enemy, authored by Keiran Hurley and directed by Finn den Hertog, toured Scotland. The play is set in a fictional Scottish town, is written using contemporary language and makes use of innovative technical effects such as overhead projected Twitter feeds, social media comments, and video live streams.

In 2024 at Duke of York's Theatre, Thomas Ostermeier directed an adaptation he co-wrote with Florian Borchmeyer. It was first staged in 2012, but was translated from German to English by Duncan Macmillan for the London performance. Starring Matt Smith and Jessica Brown Findlay, the adaptation converts the Act IV town meeting into an audience participation event which allows contemporary issues to be aired.

A new adaptation by Amy Herzog on Broadway at the Circle in the Square Theatre previewed on February 27, 2024, with an opening night March 18. The production was directed by Sam Gold and starred Jeremy Strong, Michael Imperioli, and Victoria Pedretti. Strong won the Tony Award for Best Leading Actor in a Play for his performance.

A new adaptation by Brazilian theatre director Christiane Jatahy entitled A Trial – after An Enemy of the People was commissioned jointly by Edinburgh International Festival, Festival d’Avignon, and Holland Festival who would each present it in their 2026 programmes. It starred and was co-written by award-winning actor Wagner Moura. This concept imagines the aftermath of Dr Stockmann’s declaration as an enemy of the people and sees him on trial, with the audience charged with deciding his fate. It received its world premiere on 25 June 2026 at the Internationaal Theater Amsterdam before going on to play in Avignon in July and the Lyceum Theatre in Edinburgh in August.

== Censored in Mainland China ==
An Enemy of the People, produced by Berlin's Schaubühne theater, was performed in Beijing from September 6 to September 8, 2018, but the subsequent touring of the show was cancelled due to its themes. The audience in Beijing reportedly showed overwhelming support for Dr. Stockmann, and allegedly shouted criticism of the Chinese regime during interaction parts. Even in subsequent censored performances, audiences yelled "for personal freedom!" The regime's censorship officers would not agree to any more touring unless the script was doctored in favor of the regime's thought on what a play should be.
