= Nuri al-Rawi =

Iraqi painter

Noori al-Rawi
- نوري الراوي
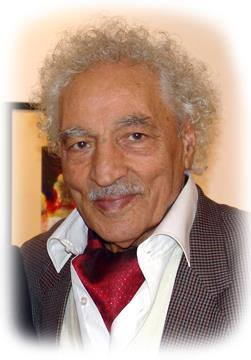
- Born: Noori Al-Rawi; 1925; Rawa, Ambar Province, Iraq
- Died: 13 May 2014 (aged 89 years); Baghdad, Iraq
- Education: Baghdad University, Institute of Fine Arts, Baghdad (1959)
- Known for: Painter, sculptor, art critic, art historian, art administrator and author

Noori al-Rawi (1925–2014) was an Iraqi painter; a pioneer of Iraqi art who played an important role in shaping the Iraqi modern art movement through his roles as a practising artist, author, television presenter, art administrator and art critic.

== Life and career ==
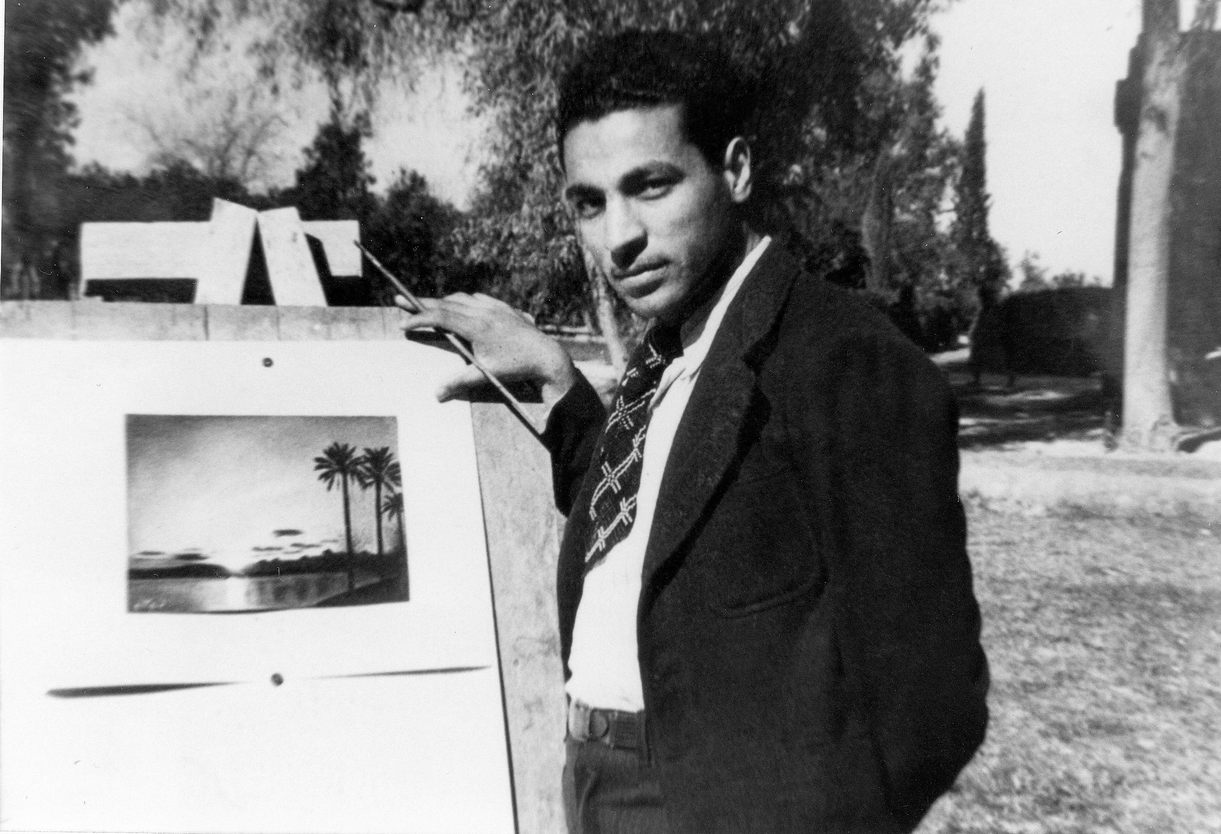
Higher Institute of Teachers, 1941

Noori al-Rawi was born in 1925 in Rawa, Al Anbar, Iraq, in the fertile, agricultural lands between the Euphrates River and the mountains and near the Babylonian city of Anah. This rural setting provided him with a lifelong source of inspiration, based on landscapes, villages and village life, all of which became his preferred subject matter.

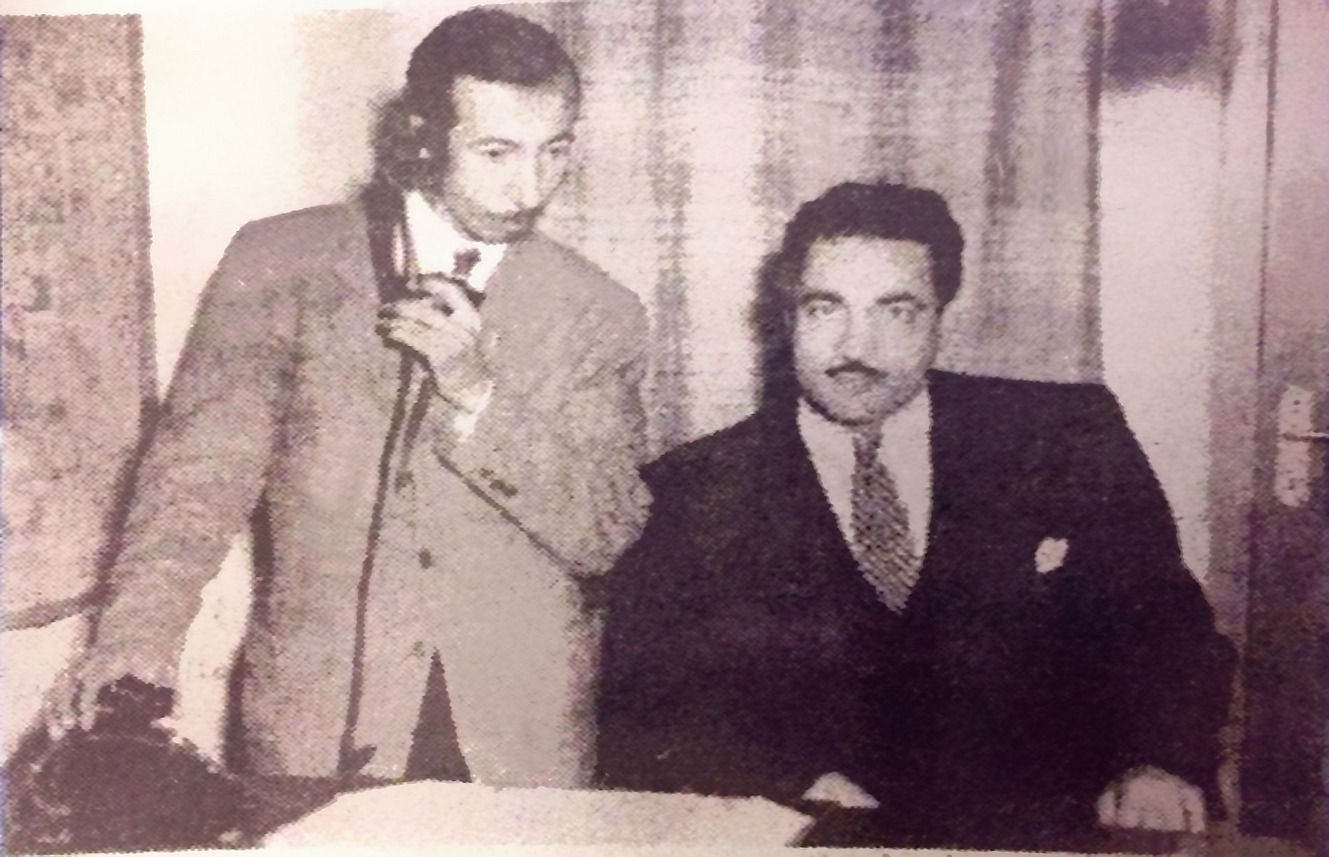
Al-Rawi with Badr Shaker Al-Sayyab, 1956

In his youth, he spent much of his time in the Baghdad Library, where he met the poet, Badr Shakir al-Sayyab, who lived in a government apartment nearby. The pair developed a friendship, and through this connection, al-Rawi learned about Iraq's ancient legacy in art and poetry.

Al-Rawi began his working career teaching drawing and art, after having graduated from a local teachers' college. He later received a formal art education first at Baghdad University, and later at the Institute of Fine Arts, graduating in 1959. He subsequently received a scholarship to study print editing and television program production in Belgrade (1962).

He was one of the pioneers of modern art in Iraq, producing a rich body of paintings and sculptures. An active participant in Iraq's arts community, he was a founding member of the Baghdad Modern art group. This group aimed to reassert a national identity through art and literature, by developing artworks with a distinctive Iraqi identity which referenced its ancient heritage and tradition.

Although a prolific painter of some note, he is mostly remembered for his roles as an art historian, art critic and art administrator. He was one of the key founders of Baghdad's National Museum of Modern Art (1962) and served as its Director from 1962 to 1974, responsible for acquiring the artworks that would comprise the core collection. His focus for the collection was to acquire works along two parallel lines, the first was Iraqi art, and the second was Arabic paintings. This was a challenging period for the museum in particular, and Iraqi art more generally, as the arts were seriously under-funded. He was also instrumental in founding several other art museums including: the Pioneer Museum, the Faik Hassan Museum and the Iraqi Museum of Creativity. He also established the first bronze smelter for use by local sculptors.

He was a prolific writer and became a respected media presenter, using his position to promote the distinctive character of Iraqi art and cement Iraq's position at the forefront of contemporary pan-Arab art. From a very early stage in his career, he published articles in the magazines, Al-Rafidain and Al-Manahil. The first to establish regular arts page in the Iraqi press, and supervised its editing. Established in 1952 and known as Time, News and Voice of the Free, the art page was instrumental in creating public interest in local art. He was the editor of the New Iraq Magazine and Journal of the Gallery. Later, he presented arts programs for Baghdad Television for some thirty years (1957-1987).

He died in Baghdad on 13 May 2014 at the age of 89.

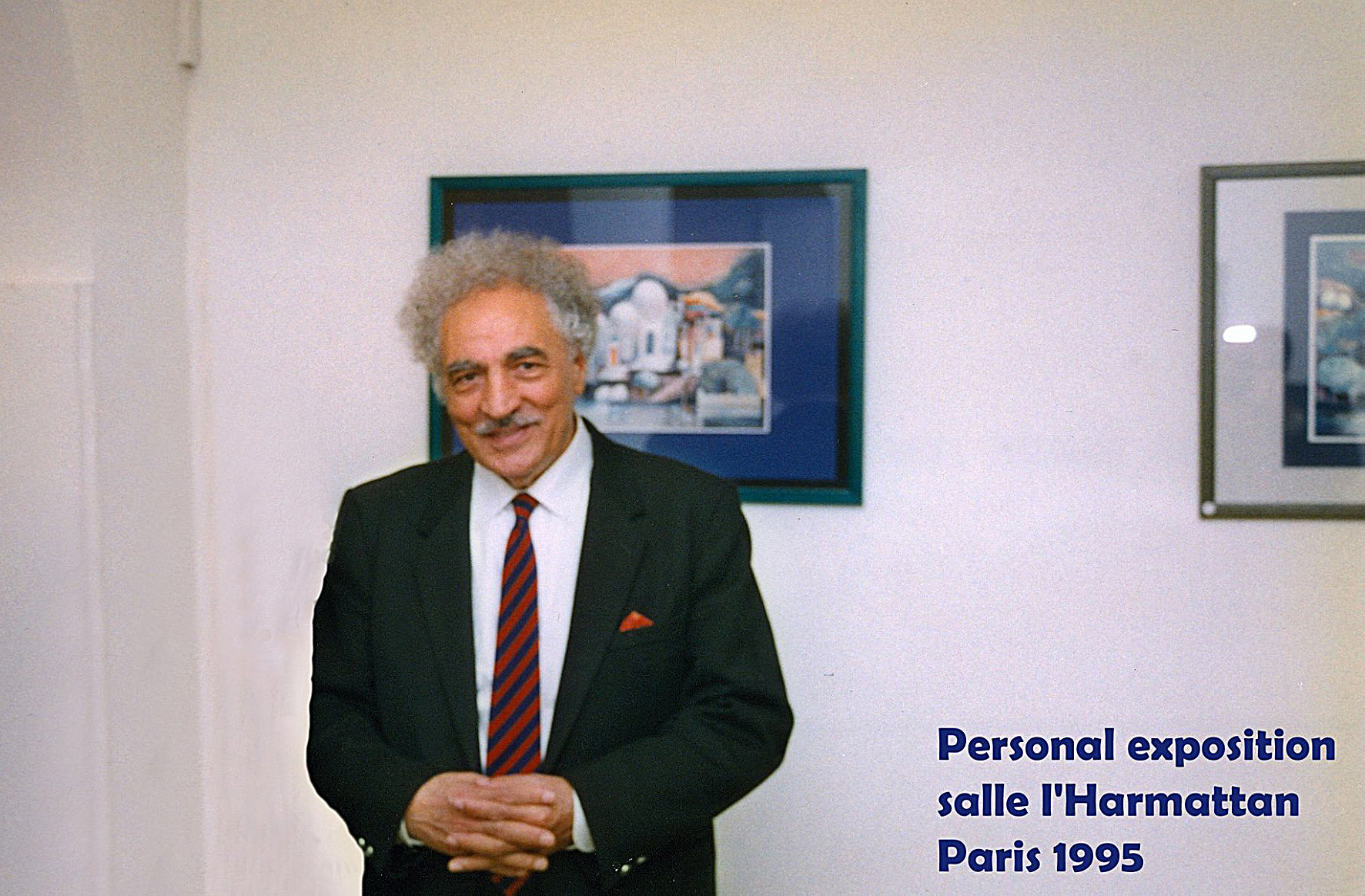
Personal exhibition in Paris 1995

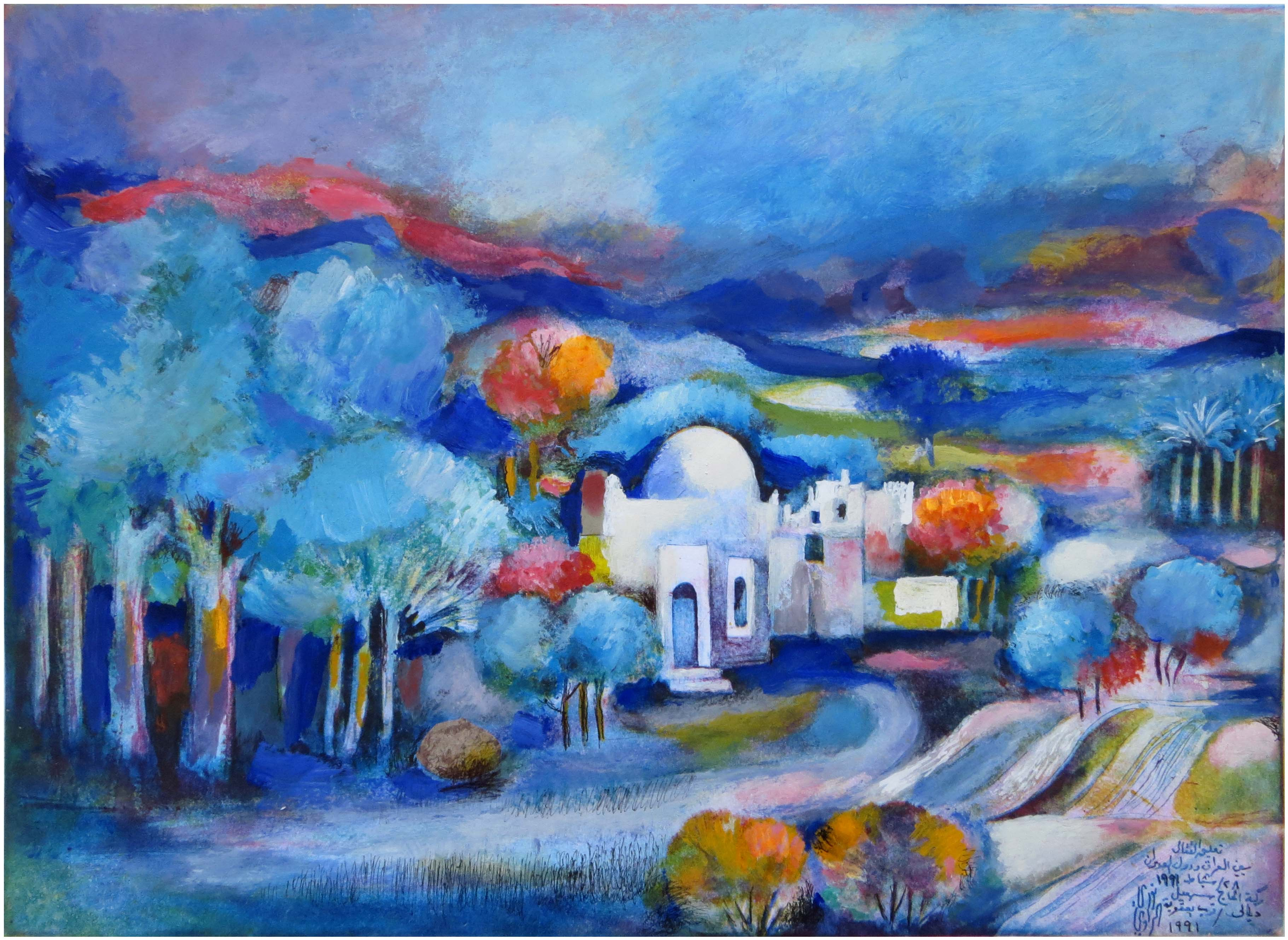
Artwork 1991

== Work ==
His paintings often merge representation with abstraction. The traditional Iraqi town is a recurring theme in his paintings. A large number of his paintings were stolen or destroyed during the 2003 looting of the Museum of Modern Art in Baghdad.

He authored one of the first books on Iraqi art, Reflections on Modern Iraqi Art, as well as six other titles dealing with various aspects of art history and related themes:

- Reflections on Modern Iraqi Art, 1962
- Introduction to Iraqi Folklore, 1962
- Jawad Saleem, 1963
- Modern German Art, 1965
- Iraq in Crafic, 1966
- Menem Firat Sculpture Fether, 1975
- Color in Science, Art and Life, 1986

Noori AlRawi by Raed AlRawi

== Awards and honours ==
- Order of Merit High, 1993
- Title of Raed Shakili, 1993

== See also ==
- Islamic art
- Iraqi art
- List of Iraqi artists
