= Edward Muallem =

Palestinian actor, director and drama trainer

- Born: 1958 (age 67–68); Mi'ilya
- Occupations: Actor, drama trainer
- Known for: Founding El-Hakawati Theatre in 1977

Edward Muallem (born 1958 in Mi'ilya) is a Palestinian actor, director, and drama trainer specialized in Theatre of the Oppressed. He holds a degree in Theatre Studies and co-founded El-Hakawati Theatre Company in Jerusalem in 1977 and ASHTAR Theatre in 1991, serving as its General Director until 2021. Muallem conducted drama workshops for children and youth since 1994. Beginning in 2004, he expanded his work internationally, leading Forum Theatre workshops in several countries.

In 2007, he received the Grozdanin Kikot International Award from the Mostar Youth Theatre in Bosnia and Herzegovina for his contributions to drama education. He also served as the director of the International Theatre of the Oppressed Festival in Palestine from 2007 to 2015. In 2024, the Palestinian Ministry of Culture recognized Muallem as the Cultural Personality of the Year for his work in theatre and education.
