= Mohammed Kaghat =

Moroccan playwright (1942–2001)

- Born: 1942
- Died: 2001 (aged 58–59)
- Citizenship: Moroccan
- Occupation: Actor Stage Director
- Notable work: Wechma

Mohammed Kaghat (1942–2001) was a Moroccan playwright, actor and stage director. He also directed several feature films and wrote several books on drama and theater in Morocco.

== Playwright and director ==
Mohammed Kaghat wrote and directed about thirty plays. Some of his plays were also published:

- L'impromptu shmicha lalla. Éditions de l'association Mohamed Kaghat des amateurs du théâtre national. Casablanca 2003.
- Manzila bayna alhazimatayne & dikrayat mina al mostakbal. Éditions de l'association Mohamed Kaghat des amateurs du théâtre national. Fès 2002.
- Assatir moâssira & Bechar el kheir. Éditions de la Faculté des Lettres et des Sciences Humaines de Fès, 1993
- Almortajala al jadida & Mortajalat Fès. Imprimerie Sebou Casablanca 1991
- Bechar el kheir. Revue Founoun (Maroc) n°1. 6th year 1979
- Abou al haoul al jadid. Revue Âfak (Maroc) n°3. 1989
- Prométhée 91 ou baghdadiyat. Journal Al alam attakafi (Maroc). June - October. 1991
- Madina bila masrah. Revue Drama (Maroc) n°1. 1992

== Actor ==
Mohammed Kaghat acted in the following films and television series:

- 1962 : "Lune de miel au Maroc" (honeymoon in Morocco) French-German production
- 1969 : "Soleil de printemps" (Sun of Spring) by Latif Lahlou.
- 1970 : "Wechma" by Hamid Bennani.
- 1991 : "La prière de l'absent" (the prayer of the absent) by Hamid Bennani.
- 1992 : "La nuit du crime" (the night of crime) by Nabil Lahlou.
- 1995 : "L'ouèd" (the river) by Hamid Bennani.
- 1995 : "La dernière balle" (the last bullet) by A. Mouline.
- 1996 : "Lalla hobbi" (miss love) by Mohamed Tazi.
- 1998 : "Ibn Batouta" (Ibn Battuta) by Hamid Basket.
- 1999 : "Assarab" (le mirage) by Hamid Bennani.
- 1999 : "Jésus" (Italian production) by Roger Young.
- 1999 : "Yacout" by Jamal Belmajdoub.
- 1999 : "Joseph" (Italian production) by Rafael Mertez.
- 2000 : "D’wayer zman" by Farida Bourkia.
- 2000 : "Hamassat" (murmures) (c. m.) by Mohamed Labdaoui.
- 2000 : "Maléna" (Italian production italienne) by Joseph Tornatore.
- 2000 : "Paul of Tarsus" by Roger Young.
- 2001 : "Moudawala" by Ksaïb.
