= Rain Song (al-Sayyab) =

Badr Shakir Arabian Poetry

Rain Song (انشودة المطر “Unshūdat almaṭar”) is a famous 1960 poetry collection and Arabic poem by Badr Shakir al-Sayyab One of the "great poems in modern Arabic poetry", it has been compared to T.S. Eliot's The Waste Land.

== Song ==
The poem was set to music by Saudi singer and composer Mohammed Abdu in 1992.
