= Palestinian National Theatre =

Theater in Jerusalem

Coordinates: 31°47′19.1″N 35°13′47.1″E

Palestinian National Theatre المسرح الوطني الفلسطيني
- Abbreviation: PNT
- Headquarters: Jerusalem
- Region served: State of Palestine
- Website: http://www.pnt-pal.org

The Palestinian National Theatre (PNT) or El-Hakawati Theatre (Arabic: المسرح الوطني الفلسطيني) is a Palestinian-owned theatre in Jerusalem's American Colony neighbourhood, near New Orient House. The theatre was established on May 9, 1984, by the El-Hakawati theatre troupe. The most notable of its founders are Radi Shhadah and François Abou Salem.

== History and general information ==
The PNT was founded by the Palestinian El-Hakawati Theatre Company. After one year, its management was handed over to a board of directors composed of artists, writers, and notable people in the Palestinian community.

=== 1989 tour ===
In the summer of 1989, the theatre planned a seven-city U.S. tour of its play The Story of Kufur Shamma, about a young man, Walid, who returns from Cairo in 1948 to find his familial village abandoned and subsequently spends 40 years finding his far-flung family members and community.

Joseph Papp had agreed to host the company at The Public Theater in New York City, but he backed out, stating he was afraid that the play would "offend" Jews who "constitute a high proportion of the theater audience in any city, but especially in New York." The play was staged at the Dance Theater Workshop instead.

== Mission and objectives ==
The PNT is a Palestinian nonprofit cultural institution that strives to create and develop a unique cultural life in Jerusalem; raise the literary and intellectual awareness of Palestinians by expanding their horizons; and produce a community of people that have confidence and pride in themselves and respect for the differences of others. Its productions depict the pluralistic history, culture, and heritage of Palestine.

== Awards ==
The PNT received the Yasser Arafat Award for Excellence and Creativity in 2016.

== See also ==
- Al-Kasaba Theatre
