= Al Owais Award =

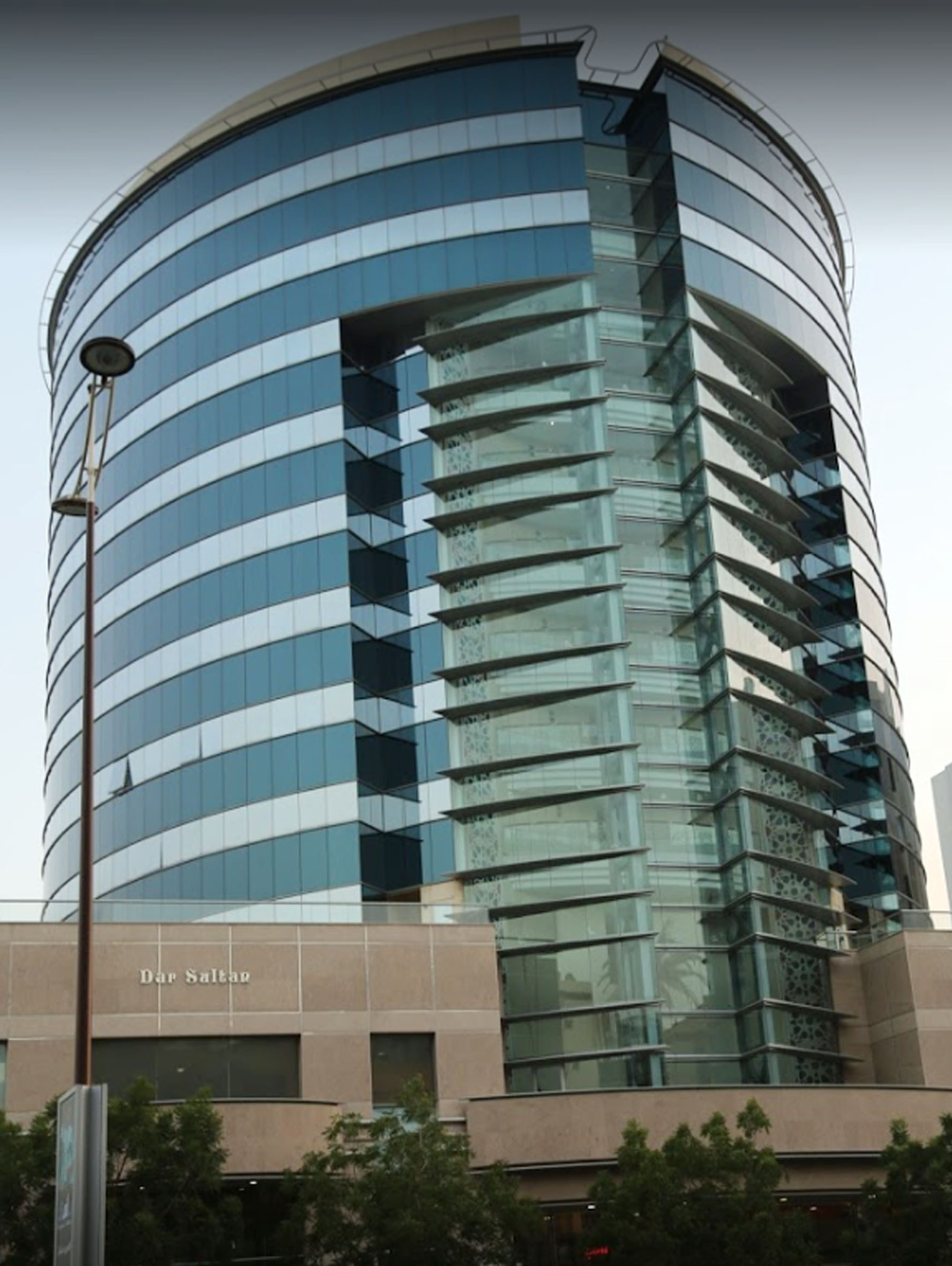
The Sultan Bin Ali Alowais Cultural Foundation building

The Sultan Bin Ali Al Owais Cultural Awards (or Al Owais Awards; Arabic: جائزة سلطان بن علي العويس) are a biennial prize for literary and cultural achievement in the Arab world. It is administered by the Sultan Bin Al Owais Cultural Foundation of the United Arab Emirates. The award was established by the late Emirati businessman and philanthropist Sultan Bin Ali Al Owais. The awards were first given out in 1988-89.

The Al Owais Cultural Awards are given in four categories: Poetry, Novels, Criticism/Literature Studies, and Human/Future Studies. Winners in each category receive a prize of US$150,000 for a total of US$600,000 making it one of the richest literary prizes in the world. The prizes were previously worth $100,000 until increased in 2025. A fifth award called the Sultan Bin Ali Al Owais Award for Scientific and Cultural Achievement has different rules and criteria, with a prize amount of US$120,000.

In 2004, the poetry prize was awarded to Iraqi poet Saadi Youssef but was withdrawn after he criticized Emirati ruler Zayed bin Sultan Al Nahyan.

== Winners ==
List of winners:

=== 1988–1989 ===
- Poetry: Fadwa Touqan
- Stories, Novels & Drama: Saadallah Wannous, Hanna Mina
- Criticism & Literature Studies: Jabra Ibrahim Jabra, Ali Jawad Al Taher

=== 1990–1991 ===
- Stories, Novels & Drama: Alfred Farag, Abdul Rahman Munif
- Criticism & Literature Studies: Ehssan Abbas
- Human & Future Studies: Zaki Nageeb Mahmood, Fuad Zacharia
- Cultural & Scientific Achievements: Mohammad Mahdi Al Jawaheri

=== 1992–1993 ===
- Poetry: Abdullah Al-Baradouni
- Stories, Novels & Drama: Sulaiman Fayyad, Sonallah Ibrahim
- Criticism & Literature Studies: Yumna Al-Eid, Farooq Abdul Qader
- Human & Future Studies: Abdullah Abdul Dayem
- Cultural & Scientific Achievements: Nizar Qabbani

=== 1994–1995 ===
- Poetry: Abd al-Wahhab Al-Bayati
- Stories, Novels & Drama: Edwar al-Kharrat
- Criticism & Literature Studies: Nasir al-Din al-Asad
- Human & Future Studies: Awatef Abdul Rahman, Mohammed Ghanem Al Rumaihi
- Cultural & Scientific Achievements: Hamad Al Jasser

=== 1996–1997 ===
- Poetry: Ahmed Abdul Mutti Hijazi, Ibrahim Nasrallah
- Stories, Novels & Drama: Gamal al-Ghitani, Walid Ikhlasi
- Criticism & Literature Studies: Gaber Asfour, Shukri Ayyad
- Human & Future Studies: Mohammed Jaber Al Anssari, Fahmi Jada’an, Mohammed Jaber Al Anssari
- Cultural & Scientific Achievements: Edward Said

=== 1998–1999 ===
- Poetry: Muhammad Afifi Matar
- Stories, Novels & Drama: Fouad al-Tikerly
- Criticism & Literature Studies: Abdullah Al Ghozami
- Human & Future Studies: Saleh Ahmad Al Ali, Nasseef Nassar
- Cultural & Scientific Achievements: Yusuf al-Qaradawi

=== 2000–2001 ===
- Poetry: Qassim Haddad
- Stories, Novels & Drama: Zakaria Tamer, Mohamed el-Bisatie
- Criticism & Literature Studies: Mohsin Jassim Al Mosawi
- Human & Future Studies: Abdul Wahab Al Maseeri
- Cultural & Scientific Achievements: Al-Arabi magazine

=== 2002–2003 ===
- Poetry: Hasab al-Shaikh Ja'far
- Stories, Novels & Drama: Muhammad Khudayyir
- Criticism & Literature Studies: Mustafa Abdou Nassif
- Human & Future Studies: Mahmoud Ameen Al A’lem
- Cultural & Scientific Achievements: Mahmoud Darwish, Adunis

=== 2004–2005 ===
- Poetry: Muhammad al-Maghut
- Stories, Novels & Drama: Iz Aldin Al Madani
- Criticism & Literature Studies: Mohammed Meftah
- Human & Future Studies: Antoon Zahlan
- Cultural & Scientific Achievements: Tharwat Okasha

=== 2006–2007 ===
- Poetry: Mohammed Bennis
- Stories Novels & Drama: Yousef el-Sharoni, Elias Khoury
- Criticism & Literature Studies: Abdelfattah Kilito
- Human & Future Studies: Hichem Djait
- Cultural & Scientific Achievements: Juma Al Majid, Salma Khadra Jayyusi

=== 2008–2009 ===
- Poetry: Abdulaziz Al-Maqaleh
- Stories, Novels & Drama: Tahar Ouettar
- Criticism & Literature Studies: Abdul Salam Misaddi
- Human & Future Studies: Galal Amin
- Cultural & Scientific Achievements: Fatima bint Mubarak Al Ketbi

=== 2010–2011 ===
- Poetry: Muhammad Ali Chamseddine
- Stories, Novels & Drama: Radwa Ashour
- Criticism & Literature Studies: Faisal Darraj
- Human & Future Studies: Abdul Aziz Al Douri
- Cultural & Scientific Achievements: Amin Maalouf

=== 2012–2013 ===
- Poetry: Mohammad Ibrahim Abu Senna, Nazih Abu Afash
- Stories, Novels & Drama: Mohammed Azeddine Tazi
- Criticism & Literature Studies: Ahmed Etman
- Human & Future Studies: El Sayed Yassin
- Cultural & Scientific Achievements: Dar Al Khaleej Printing & Publishing

=== 2014–2015 ===
- Poetry: Habib Al Sayegh
- Stories, Novels & Drama: Yusuf al-Qa'id, Ismail Fahd Ismail
- Criticism & Literature Studies: Salah Fadl, Kamal Abu-Deeb
- Human & Future Studies: Roshdi Rashed
- Cultural & Scientific Achievements: King Faisal Foundation

=== 2016–2017 ===
- Poetry: Chawki Bazih
- Stories, Novels & Drama: Hoda Barakat, Abdel Khaliq al-Rikabi
- Criticism & Literature Studies: Hammadi Hmaida Sammoud
- Human & Future Studies: Georges Corm
- Cultural & Scientific Achievements: United Arab Emirates University

=== 2018–2019 ===
- Poetry: Ali Ja'far al-Allaq
- Stories, Novels & Drama: Alawiya Sobh
- Criticism & Literature Studies: Mohammed Lutfi Al Yusufi
- Human & Future Studies: Haidar Ibrahim Ali
- Cultural & Scientific Achievements: Mai bint Mohammed Al Khalifa

=== 2020–2021 ===
- Poetry: Elias Lahoud
- Stories, Novels & Drama: Nabil Suleiman
- Criticism & Literature Studies: Abdelmalek Mortad
- Human & Future Studies: Ahmed Zayed
- Cultural & Scientific Achievements: Assilah Forum Foundation

=== 2022–2023 ===
- Poetry: Hassan Talab
- Stories, Novels & Drama: Amin Saleh
- Criticism & Literature Studies: Abdullah Ibrahim
- Human & Future Studies: Abdessalam Benabdelali
