= Amjad Nasser =

Jordanian writer (1955–2019)

- Born: 1955 al-Turra, Jordan
- Died: 31 October 2019 (aged 63–64); London, United Kingdom
- Education: Beirut Arab University
- Occupation: Editor
- Writing career
- Genres: Poetry, novel
- Notable works: Land of No Rain, Shepherd of Solitude

Amjad Nasser (Arabic: أمجد ناصر), known with the pseudonym of Yahya Numeiri al-Naimat (Arabic: يحيى النميري النعيمات), (1955 – 31 October 2019) was a London-based Jordanian writer, journalist and poet and one of the pioneers of modern Arabic poetry and Arabic prose poem.

== Biography ==
Born in al-Turra, Jordan, Nasser was the eldest son in a military oriented Bedouin family. In high school he began writing poetry and was interested in politics and the Arabic language. Nasser grew up in Zarqa from the age of three where he saw first hand the plight of the Palestinian refugees in the city and was deeply affected. He was also impressed by the Palestinian militant movement, which he joined after graduating school.

He worked in the Jordanian television and print media in Amman for around two years. He then left for Lebanon in 1977, following a political crisis linked to the Palestinian organization he was a part of, the Jordanian Revolutionary People's Party.

In Lebanon, he joined one of the Palestinian militant underground organizations, while at the same time studying at Beirut Arab University. But he soon left his studies and devoted himself full-time to journalistic and cultural work in the Palestinian media. He worked as an editor for the cultural section of al-Hadaf magazine, which was founded by Ghassan Kanafani, he worked there until the Siege of Beirut in the summer of 1982, when he started to work with Palestinian radio.

Then as a part of his political activity, Nasser joined the "Scientific Socialism Institute" of Aden in the former People's Democratic Republic of Yemen, where he taught political science, while Abdul Fattah Ismail was in power.

In 1979, he published his first collection of poetry Madih li-Maqha Akhar, in which Iraqi poet Saadi Yousef wrote the preface. This collection was well received by critics, especially in the Lebanese and Arab press.

After the siege of Beirut in 1982, Amjad Nasser left for Cyprus, where he continued to work in the Palestinian media. In 1987, he went to London to work in the Arab media in Britain, including the daily newspaper Al-Quds al-Arabi, where he edited the newspaper's culture section .

In 2014, the United States prohibited him from traveling to the country.

== Move to prose poem ==
Despite Nasser's left-wing political and ideological beliefs his poetry remained free from political slogans. His poetry emphasized the celebration of daily life in detail, rather than raw politics. This feature marked Nasser's poetry for long time.

Amjad Nasser was one of the pioneers among the young poets who after a remarkable experience with poetry, converted to prose poem. Starting with his second work entitled Mundhu jil'ad, published in 1981, he continued to write this kind of poetry with his distinctive use of the Arabic language, which critic Subhi Hadidi, said was missing in his third work called Raa'at al-'uzla (1986).

In his collection Surra man Raak (Happy is he who sees you), published in 1994, he re-created a new Arabic poetry of love, described by a number of Arab critics, modern and unique.

In another collection Murtaqa al anfas (the heyday of breath), published in 1997, he developed a way to both panoramic, lyrical and epic tragedy of Abu Abdullah As-Saghir, the last Arabic king in Andalusia .

In his last poetic work Hayatun sardin mutaqatta'in ka (life as an intermittent narrative) published in 2004, Amjad Nasser took a new path in prose poetry in Arabic. It pushed the boundaries of narrative poetry unprecedented, but without watering down the poem of his poetic charge buried deep in the text. This work was met with many reactions that ranged from the good reception given to this bold opening to the story with the prosaic manner that it requires, and the refusal by those who consider that the prosaic narrative is greater than that borne by the poem. But Amjad Nasser's approach in this work remains as a new aesthetic inspiration that would commit the controversy in an Arab poetic context almost devoid of any debate on the issues of form and content. This has been prepared by the Lebanese poet and critic Abbas Beydoun, in his dialogue with Amjad Nasser after the publication of the collection in question.

== Recognitions and awards ==
Some of his works have been translated into French, Italian, Spanish, German, Dutch, and English.

He participated in many Arab and international poetry festivals, such as Cairo or that of Jerash in Jordan where he was responsible for its international leadership; or that of London (London Poetry Festival) which was the first time an Arab poet has read his poems in one of its opening evenings; or that of Rotterdam (Rotterdam International Poetry) or that of Colombia (Medellín's International Poetry Festival, Colombia).

Added to this were his interests as a member of the jury for literary prizes or of the press, both Arab and international; whose literary prize "Mohsen Qattan" Award and the "Literary Reportage" are discerned by the prestigious German magazine "Letter".

He published eight books of poetry and two books of travelogue. Because of these stories, Amjad Nasser is considered one of the first contemporary Arab intellectuals to take an interest in the genre. In 2006, he won the Mohammed Al-Maghout prize for poetry.

Several television documentaries have been produced on Amjad Nasser and his work. The film, produced by Jordanian television called Sinbad the landowner, on the occasion of the appointment of Amman as Arab Capital of Culture for 2002, or that produced by the chain "al Arabiya" as part of the show Rawafid (Tributaries), were broadcast on two episodes.

About his experience, it is reported there are a number of testimonials written by critics and Arab poets, such as Adunis, Subhi Hadidi, Hatem al-Sakr, Kamal Abu-Deeb, Sabry Hafez, Abbas Beydoun Hussein Bin Hamza, Rashid Yahyaoui, Qassim Haddad, Fakhri Saleh, Mohammad Ali Shams al-Din, Shawqi Bzi Mohsen Jassim al-Moussawi, Raja Ben Slama, Fathi Abdallah and Hilmi Salim. Some of his stories were published in two special issues of the magazine Al-Palestinian shou'ara (Poets) and in the journal Jordanian Afkar (Ideas), which had allowed his poetic experience to confirm.

== Works ==
Amjad Nasser had published since he began writing, eight books of poetry and a novel. His complete works of poetry were published in one volume in 2002 at the Al-al-arabiya mou'assassa editor (The Arab Institution for Studies and Publishing).

- Madih li maq'ha akher (Praise be to another coffee) Beirut 1979
- Jil'ad Moundhou (Since Gilead, he climbed the mountain), Beirut 1981
- Rou'at al-ouzla (Guardians of solitude), Amman 1986
- Woussoul al-ghourabaa (The arrival of foreigners), London, First Edition, 1990
- Surra man Raak (Happy is he who sees you), London, 1994
- Athar al-abir (The trace of the way), selected poems, Cairo, 1995
- Khabtu'l ajniha (The flapping wings), Traveling, London, Beirut 1996
- Murtaqa al anfas (the heyday of breath), Beirut, 1997
- Wahidan Ka-Dhi'b al-Farazdaq (only as al-Farazdaq wolf) Damascus in 2008
- Haythou the tasqoutoul 'Amtar (Where it does not rain), novel, 2010

Works in French

- Ascension de l'amant, Editions L'Harmattan, 1998, ISBN 9782296364905

Works in English

- Shepherd of Solitude: Selected Poems, 1979-2004, Translated by Khaled Mattawa, Banipal Books, 2009, ISBN 9780954966683
- Land of No Rain. Translated by Jonathan Wright. A&C Black. 5 June 2014. ISBN 978-9927-101-17-5.
- Petra: The Concealed Rose, Translated by Fady Joudah, Tavern Books, 2014, ISBN 9781935635406
- Contributor to A New Divan: A Lyrical Dialogue Between East and West ISBN 9781909942288
