= Yumna =

Yumna is a feminine given name of Arabic origin. Notable people with this name include:

== Given name ==
- Yumna Al-Eid (born 1935), Lebanese writer and literary critic
- Yumna Kassab, Australian novelist
- Yumna Marwan, Lebanese-Palestinian actress
- Yumna Maumoon (born 1970), Maldivian politician
- Yumna Tarif Khuli (born 1955), Egyptian academic
- Yumna Zaidi (born 1989), Pakistani actress
