= Ahmed Madan (poet) =

Bahraini poet

- أحمد مدن
- Born: Ahmed bin Yaqoub bin Yusef Al-Madan; 1955 (age 69–70); Nuwaidrat, Bahrain
- Occupation: poet

Ahmed bin Yaqoub bin Yusef Al-Madan (Arabic: أحمد يعقوب يوسف المَدَن, born in 1955) is a Bahraini poet. Born in the village of Nuwaidrat, he studied in local public schools and at King Saud University, from which he graduated as a civil engineer in 1980. He has worked in a number of engineering fields in Bahrain and has published several collections of poetry.

== Biography ==
Madan was born in 1955 in Nuwaidrat in the Central Governorate of Bahrain. He completed his secondary education, including a general science diploma, in 1973. He joined the King Saud University College of Engineering in Saudi Arabia and graduated at the beginning of 1980 with a Bachelor's degree in architecture.

Returning to his homeland, he joined the Central Municipal Provisional Authority in 1980 and worked as an engineer in its Technical and Engineering Affairs Department, getting promoted to head of the Building Permits Department in 1985.

He is a member of the Bahrain Society of Engineers and the Bahrain Writers' Circle, having served as Secretary of the latter.

== Literary career ==
His first poetry was published in local newspapers in the 1970s and was influenced by pioneering poets of the era such as Badr Shakir al-Sayyab, Abd al-Wahhab Al-Bayati, Mahmoud Darwish, and Saadi Yousef. Kamil Salman Al-Jabburi wrote of his work that "he eschewed prose poetry for metaphors."

== Publications ==
His poetry collections include:

- صباح الكتابة ("Morning Writing", 1984)
- عشب لدم الورقة أو عشب لورقة الدم ("Leafs for Blood Grass and Grass for Blood Leaves", 1992)
- سماء ثالثة ("Third Sky", 2000)
- الصحو بجرعات ماثلة ("Waking Up with Fresh Doses", 2017)
