= Fouad al-Tikerly =

Iraqi novelist and writer

Fouad al-Tikerly (Arabic: فؤاد التكرلي; August 22, 1927 – February 11, 2008) was a prominent Iraqi novelist and writer, best known for his groundbreaking novel al-Rajea al-Baeed, translated into English as The Long Way Back. Al-Tikerly was one of the last surviving members of a group of well known Iraqi novelists from the 1970s.

== Biography ==
Al-Tikerly was born in Baghdad in 1927. At school he became friends with Abdul-Wahab al-Bayati. He graduated from the University of Baghdad's law school in 1949. Employed at the Ministry of Justice of Iraq for 35 years, he became a judge in 1956 before later becoming head judge of the city of Baghdad's Court of Appeals. While in this position he acquired a notable reputation for fairness.

Al-Tikerly moved to Paris in 1964 in order to pursue postgraduate legal studies; he later returned to France briefly during the 1980s. He retired from the law in 1983 in order to devote more time to writing novels.

al-Rajea al-Baeed (The Long Way Back), published in 1980, depicts the suffering and trials afflicting four generations of a Baghdad family under several oppressive Iraqi government regimes in the years after the fall of the Iraqi monarchy, including that of Saddam Hussein. Al-Tikerly's novel was one of few to openly criticize the Iraqi government without repercussions. Al-Tikerly had no political affiliation, and was not connected to the Arab Socialist Ba'ath Party or the regime of Saddam Hussein.

Al-Tikerly moved to Tunisia in 1990 after the death of his wife. He later remarried the Tunisian novelist Rachida Turki.

The government of the United Arab Emirates awarded al-Tikerly with the Owais Prize for Arabic-language novels and literature in 2000.

== Death ==
Fouad al-Tikerly died of pancreatic cancer at a hospital in Amman, Jordan, on February 11, 2008, at the age of 80. He and his family had been living in Jordan for the previous three years in order to escape the violence which swept Iraq following the 2003 Iraq War. He was survived by his wife and their son, as well as three daughters from his previous marriage.

Iraqi President Jalal Talabani praised al-Tikerly "as an author and judge as well a president's adviser after the tyrant regime [i.e. Sadaam Hussein's] was ousted."
