= Mohammed Al-Ghazwani Moftah =

Moroccan writer and intellectual

- Born: 1942 (age 83–84); Casablanca
- Occupation: University professor
- Awards: King Faisal International Prize 2016

Mohammed Al-Ghazwani Moftah (Arabic:محمد الغزواني مفتاح) is a Moroccan writer and an intellectual who was born in Casablanca 1942. He specialized in the ancient and contemporary critical approaches and the thought of the Islamic Maghreb. He is currently a retired professor from Mohammed V University in Rabat.

== Career ==
Moftah obtained a degree in Arabic literature in 1966, and a diploma in linguistic and literary studies, proficiency in education and psychology in 1967. He obtained a doctorate of state in literature in 1981. Professor Moftah has taught at the University of Rabat since 1971, and he attained the rank of a professorship in 1981. He taught the writing styles in the Islamic Maghreb and the unit of "criticism and new rhetoric" for postgraduate students. He supervised university theses, he gave many inaugural lessons at universities. He also gave several lessons and lectures at the Faculties of Arts at the University of Sfax, King Saud University in Riyadh in the Kingdom of Saudi Arabia, and the University of Nouakchott in Mauritania, he was invited as a visiting professor at Princeton University in the United States of America.

== Books ==
He has many books, including:

- Jame Watahqiq Lisune Diwan Lilssan Aldiyn Bin Alkhatib Alsulmanii Al’andilsii (Collection and investigation for the making of a diwan of Lisan Eddin bin Al-Khatib Al-Salmani Al-Andalusi), in 1989, 2009.
- Alkhitab Alsuwfi Muqarabaa Wazifia (Sufi discourse is a functional approach), 1997.
- Fi Siamia' Alshier Alqadim, 1982.
- Mafahim Muwasa'a Li Nazaryah Shi'ryah (Extended concepts of poetic theory), 2010.

== Awards ==
Muhammad Moftah won several awards, the most important of which are:

- King Faisal International Prize 2016 (Arabic Language and Literature).
- Sheikh Zayed Book Award in 2011. (for the book "Extended Concepts of Poetic Theory (Language-Music-Movement)).
- Arab Network for Tolerance Award 2010.
- Sultan bin Ali Al Owais Award in 2004.
- Morocco Book Prize in 1995.
- "The Great Maghreb Prize for Books in Literature and the Arts" in 1987.
