= Ahmed Madan =

Ahmed Madan may refer to:

- Ahmed Madan (cyclist)
- Ahmed Madan (poet)
