= Robyn Creswell =

American critic, scholar and translator

Robyn Creswell is an American critic, scholar and translator.

He graduated from Brown University in 1999 and gained a doctorate in comparative literature from New York University in 2011. In addition to teaching comparative literature at Brown University, he also serves as poetry editor of the Paris Review. Creswell's specialization is contemporary Arabic literature.

He has translated several literary works from the Middle East, including That Smell and Notes from Prison by Sonallah Ibrahim and The Clash of Images by Abdelfattah Kilito, and has written numerous essays for various literary periodicals. A revised version of his thesis Tradition and Translation: Poetic Modernism in Beirut (2012) was published by Princeton University Press as City of Beginnings: Poetic Modernism in Beirut (2019).

Creswell won the 2013 Roger Shattuck Prize for Criticism, awarded by the Center for Fiction.

== Bibliography ==
=== Books ===
- Creswell, Robyn (2019). City of beginnings : poetic modernism in Beirut. Princeton, N.J.: Princeton UP.
- Contributor to A New Divan: A Lyrical Dialogue Between East and West (Gingko Library, 2019). ISBN 9781909942288

Translations

- Abdelfattah Kilito. The clash of images, London: Darf Publishers, 2010. ISBN 9781850773108
- Sonollah Ibrahim. That smell and notes from prison. New Directions, 2013. ISBN 9780811220361
- Abdelfattah Kilito. The tongue of Adam. New Directions, 2015. ISBN 9780811224932
- Iman Mersal. The Threshold. Farrar Straus Giroux, 2022. ISBN 978-0374604271

=== Book reviews ===
Year	Review article	Work(s) reviewed
2019	Creswell, Robyn (March 7–20, 2019). "An enthusiastick sect". The New York Review of Books. 66 (4): 23–25.	Knysh, Alexander. A new history of Islamic mysticism. Princeton UP.; Husayn ibn Mansur al-Hallaj. Poems of a Sufi martyr. Translated from the Arabic by Carl W. Ernst. Northwestern UP.
2025	Creswell, Robyn (February 13, 2025). "Bewildered Rhapsodies". The New York Review of Books. 72 (2): 39–42.	Habib, M.A.R.; Lawrence, Bruce B. The Qur’an: A Verse Translation. Liveright.; The Devotional Qur’an: Beloved Surahs and Verses. Selected and translated by Shawkat M. Toorawa. Yale UP.
