= Muhammad Ali Chamseddine =

Lebanese poet and writer (1942–2022)

- Born: 15 October 1942; Beit Yahoun, Lebanese Republic
- Died: 11 September 2022 (aged 79)
- Occupation: Poet

Muhammad Ali Chamseddine (15 October 1942 – 11 September 2022; in Arabic: محمد علي شمس الدين) was a Lebanese poet and writer. His work was influenced by the poet Khwāja Shams-ud-Dīn Muḥammad Ḥāfeẓ-e Shīrāzī (1315–1390). Chamseddine is regarded as one of the pioneers of modern poetry in the Arab world since 1973. He participated in various Arab poetry festivals and was a member of the administrative board of the Arab Writer's Union. Chamseddine has a strong spiritual relationship with poetry and his works are recognized worldwide.

== Biography ==
=== Early life ===
Muhammad Ali Chamseddine was born in 1942 in Beit Yahoun, a village located in Bint Jbeil District in Nabatieh Governorate in Lebanon. He was raised in a Muslim family and used to listen to his grandparents' voices reciting Qur'an verses and Karbala'iyat which are poetic verses related to Ashura. Numerous poets inspired Chamseddine in his childhood including Al ma'arri, Abū Hayyān al-Tawhīdī, and Albert Camus. He read various poetry books that were found in his grandparents' library, which inspired him to start writing his own short stories at the age of twelve. Then, he began writing short sayings and quotes and finally wrote his first poem at the age of fourteen. He would memorize French poetry on his way to Forn El Chebbak School where he studied and was the only one who passed his class and earned the French Brevet in 1985.

=== Career ===
Chamseddine earned a bachelor of arts degree in Arabic literature, a bachelor of arts degree in law, and a doctorate of philosophy in history. He was a member of the Arab Writers' Union, of the administrative board of the Lebanese Writers' Union, and the Honor of the Jordanian Writers' Association.

Writing poems was not his main job, as very few Arabic poets have poetry as their main source of income. Chamseddine's primary income came from working as Director of Inspection and Control at the National Social Security Fund and Chief inspector in Social Security for the first category employees in Beirut, Lebanon. He was also an instructor of art history at the “Institute of Higher Education”.

== Influence of Hafez ==
=== Overview of Hafez's world wide influence ===
Khwāja Shams-ud-Dīn Muḥammad Ḥāfeẓ-e Shīrāzī has a prominent status among Arab writers and poets who praised him and chanted for him a variety of poems. The fame and popularity of this great Persian poet exceeded all limits. He became one of the most popular poets in the Arab region. Many literature poets believe that Al Shirazi is an expert in love poems specifically, due to the spiritual pleasure a reader can feel upon reading them. Al Shirazi’s poems are compared to a festival due to their capability to cheer and entertain readers; they are full of real-life comparisons, literary devices, imagery, and imagination; he was even able to add his sense of humor to such poems. Having his poems being spread all around the world, poets and translators of different nationalities tended to translate them into all languages.

- Many studies were done on Hafez and his impact, including a study on Arabic translations of his divan (ديوان). Concerning Hafez’s influence on Arab writers, studies appeared at the level of articles, including:
1. An article entitled "Hafez al-Shirazi’s Literature in the Al-Harafish Epic" This article was brought to light in the hands of its authors Hussein Merzai, and Hashem Muhammad Hashem Al-Kumi. In it, the authors shed light on the influence of Hafez al- Shirazi in Naguib Mahfouz's al-Harafish epic. It was published in the Journal of Arabic Language and Literature in 2012.
2. An article under the title "Baztab Farhan and Iranian Literature Drafting the Poetry of Abdul Wahab Al-Bayati" was published in the Kaushanamah Journal of Applied Literature at the University of Kermanshah. Here, the authors, Nasir Mohseni Nia, and Sayeda, the Masouleh Brothers, discuss the influence of Hafez in the poetry of Abdul Wahhab Al-Bayati, in addition to his influence on the Nisaburi tents.
3. An article under the title "Abd al-Wahhab al-Bayati and Hafez al-Shirazi", was published in the quarterly magazine Lisan Mobin in 2013. The writer Ahmed Pasha Zanous discusses the impact of Hafez's Sufi ideas and opinions on the poems of Abd al-Wahhab Al-Bayati.
4. An article entitled "Criticism and Barrasi translated by Hafez Shirazi's ghazals by Zaban Arabic" was published in Zaban Magazine and Adabiyat Al-Arabi 2012. Here, the author Muhammad Reda Azizi deals with a study on Arabic translations of Hafez’s gossip and criticizes it in a special style.

=== Hafez and Chamseddine ===
Muhammad Ali Chamseddine, the deeply-present Lebanese poet, is one of the most prominent contemporary poets influenced by Persian-Sufi poetry, which was one of his life’s most important cultural components. He says: "The basic seeds are present in my childhood, specifically beside the village minaret, where the muezzin recites the Azan every day at the dawn. My grandfather, the sheik, was also the owner of a melodious voice and recites poems. I read about [the Persian poets] Yahya ibn Habash Suhrawardi, Al-Hallaj, Al-Niffari, Jalāl ad-Dīn Muhammad Rūmī, and finally Hafez."

Chamseddine's knowledge of Hafez al-Shirazi dates back not long ago, and that was prominent during his visit to Iran as requested by the Iranian Ministry of Culture. What most caught Chamseddine’s attention was the strong dominance of the Iranian poet Hafiz al-Shirazi on the popular cultural mood despite his death centuries before. He bought various editions from the Divan of Hafez, which he carried with him from Shiraz to Beirut. He worked on these editions for five consecutive years to read, understand, interpret, and compare.

After that, he felt ill and was away from social life for several months. He suffered from immense pain. During that time, he read Hafez’s diwan, and he says: "Then suddenly, while I was on the bed of sickness, poems began to be born, one after the other, as if they were coming out from (The Home of the Secrets), and without direct reference, I wrote them from inside myself, and for the first time... I swam in that beautiful sea ... and it's over".

Later in 2003, Chamseddine issued his book of Malik Malikss, at the end of which there are eight poems under the title "Shiraziyat" that are poems dedicated to Hafiz al-Shirazi and was issued by The Union of Lebanese Arab Writers on 1 May 2005. The "Shiraziyat" included 8 poetry compositions, which are ((Al-Hirah)), ((Shiraz)), ((Circumambulation around the waist)), ((My heart is far)), ((The Sign of Magic)), ((Modify the drink)), ((Wandering)) and ((Before the world shattered)).

The aspects of Muhammad Ali Chamseddine's influence on Hafiz al-Shirazi are evident in various topics, which Hafiz wrote about such as:

- Longing for God and fusion for the sake of truth:

Hafez talks in one of his poetic verses about his old diligent work to reach God and know more about him.

Also, Chamseddine says in a poetic verse "I wish you look at me once, your look emulates that of all creatures and nations"

- The demise of the world:

Hafez assures in one of his verses that this world has no fulfillment and will end. No need for a person to mourn the loss of something.

And In his poem "My House Has Two Doors", Chamseddine says "Don't mind thinking about things that will vanish, all creatures are on their way to an end"

- Acknowledgment of sins and the remorse for them:

Hafez admits in a verse that he committed sins, and continues to say that he is sure he is on the right path to The Holy Heaven in the end.

Influenced by Hafez, Chamseddine says "I drowned in sins, but God's generosity will carry me to The Holy Heaven"

== Relation with poetry ==
Chamseddine started the search for his passion at a young age. He started dreaming of conducting an orchestra at the age of 10. He even got an accordion and started learning music. After some time playing and learning the instrument, he felt that he wasn’t meant to pursue a musical career. He tried writing short stories, but he felt that “it didn’t fulfill the void in his soul”, until he finally started writing Arabic poetry. Chamseddine described poetry as “the answer to his mysterious internal questions” and “the only thing that can satisfy his passion”. Every poem he writes is inspired by an event that he experienced at some point in his life. His poems are known to have a sad undertone. The sadness in his poems is inspired by the atmosphere that surrounded him in his childhood village and the Karbala'iyat (poetic verses related to Ashura) that he used to listen to as a child.

Although Chamseddine is a modern poet, his poems don’t belong to the modern style alone. He writes poems of different genres and fields. Most of his poetry interacts with symbols of Arab and Islamic history.

Chamseddine was once asked in an interview with al-Quds newspaper about his view on the role of poetry in the current times. He answered by saying: “poetry has a lot of roles yet no roles, Poetry is used for celebration, entertainment, appreciating beauty, activating one’s imagination, awakening one’s soul, enjoying music, chanting, expressing the meaning of freedom, questioning existence and inexistence, satisfying one’s soul, describing pain, and countless other roles.”

== Published works and accomplishments ==
Before writing his first collection of poems he used to write hundreds of poems and hide them as he was anxious and suspicious. In 1974, Chamseddine introduced his first collection of poems ’’Qasa’id moharaba 'ila habibati asya’’ in “Al-Marbad” the fourth Arabic poetry in Basra, Iraq. Several famous Arabic poets attended the event including Nizar Qabbani, Mahmoud Darwish, Saadi Youssef, and Muhammad Mahdi al-Jawahiri. His poetry collection was considered one of the best in the festival as it caught the attention of Suhail Idris, who was an attendant that helped him in printing his first edition in “Dar Al Adab” Beirut. This collection ’’Qasa’id moharaba 'ila habibati asya'' was very successful and renowned.

Chamseddine published several collections including:

=== Poems ===
- Smuggled poems to my sweetheart Asia (qasayid moharaba 'iilaa habibati asia)
- Clouds of dreams of the deposed king (ghym li'ahlam almalik almakhloo’)
- I call you my king and my love
- Violet thorn
- Birds to the bitter sun
- As for the dance to end
- Bird Admiral
- Plow in wells
- Dice houses
- High kingdoms
- Stone winds
- The Book of Circulation
- Isolation rings
- Despair of the rose
- Strangers in their place
- Clouds in the suburbs
- Shiraziyat
- Complete Works (two parts)
- Those who descend on the wind

=== Literature ===
- The Quiet Reform (Historical Research)
- Sing Sing (children’s stories)
- Colorful story (children's stories)

Two years after introducing his first collection of poems, Chamseddine published ghym li'ahlam almalik almakhlooa. He published a book, a collection of poems or stories for children. During his career, Chamseddine wrote about 19 poetry collections including the last one “Alnaziloon ‘an Lrih “introduced in 2014. Chamseddine had different poems on different topics having most of his poets influenced by Arabs and Muslim history. In addition, Chamseddine has written three books as well as critical and literary articles on poetry, literature, and thoughts in newspapers and magazines.

== Political views ==
Chamseddine's house was destroyed during the invasion of South Lebanon by the Israeli forces (who previously invaded Palestine).

In support of the Palestinian cause, Chamseddine announced his withdrawal from the "Sheikh Zayed Book Award" in 2020 to protest against the normalization agreement between the Emirates and the Zionist Israeli regime. He wrote on his Facebook account that "The withdrawal was from my book (The Last Thing Left by Wilds), issued by the Arab Renaissance House in 2020. The house had nominated the book for this award with my authorization, before the announcement of the American-Israeli agreement, which was a sufficient and compelling reason for me to take this position to withdraw the nomination and authorizations with him."

== Honours, decorations, awards and distinctions ==
Chamseddine was honored in Lebanon and other Arabic countries.

In 2006, he was honored by “Diwan Al’arabi’’, where he was awarded the shield of the magazine in Cairo in recognition of his efforts and poetic generosity.

In 2011, he won the "Owais" poetry prize.

In 2015, he won the "Sharqa" award for Arabic poetry.

Several Arab universities taught his poetry including the Lebanese University. Numerous master's and doctoral theses were written about him. A Spanish Orientalist, Dr. Pedro Martin, wrote a study about him in a booklet called “Al Manara Publishing 77 Madrid “. The series Modern Literature also known as “Al Reef Cultural Movement“ included a book named “Studying the Poetic Language of Mohammad Shams Al Din” published by Dr. Ali Nahdi Zaitoun in Lebanon in 1996.
