= Ali Jawad Al Taher =

Iraqi critic and literary scholar

Ali Jawad Al Taher (Arabic: علي جواد الطاهر; 1911?/1922? – 10 October 1996) was an Iraqi critic and literary scholar. He was born and raised in Hilla, Iraq. He received a PhD from Sorbonne University in 1954, and published numerous critical studies during his lifetime. He won the inaugural Al Owais Award in the "Criticism & Literary Studies" category in 1988–89.

== Selected works ==
- Arabic Poetry in Iraq and Persia in the Seljuk Era
- The Son and Seven Other Stories
- The Lamiya of Al Tughrai
- Al Tughrai
- Modern Iraqi Fiction
- Teaching Arabic
- Mahmoud Ahmad Al Sayed
- Observations on the Simplified Arabic Encyclopaedia
- Literary Research Methods
- Al Khouraimi: Poems
- Al Jawahiri: Poems
- Al Tughrai: Poems
- Beyond the Literary Horizon
- Encyclopedia of Arabic Publications
- Modern Stories and Plays
