= El Sayed Yassin =

Egyptian political writer and intellectual (1931–2017)

- Born: 30 October 1931; Alexandria
- Died: 19 March 2017 (aged 85); Giza, Egypt
- Education: Alexandria University
- Occupation: Sociologist

El Sayed Yassin (Arabic: السيد ياسين. 3 September 1933 – 19 March 2017) was an Egyptian political and social writer and intellectual. He was born in Alexandria on 30 October 1931.

== Early life ==
He graduated from the college of law of Alexandria University, then obtained a master's in sociology and political science from Cairo University. He worked at the National Center for Social and Criminological Research before traveling to France to study law at the University of Dijon (1964–1966) and social sciences at the University of Paris (1966), during that time he took an interest in literary sociology, which was still emerging, as well as political sociology.

Upon his return to Egypt, El Sayed Yassin joined the Centre for Palestinian and Zionist Studies in Al-Ahram in 1968, which journalist Mohammed Hussein Heikal renamed to the Al-Ahram Center for Political and Strategic Studies, Yassin participated in co-founding the centre and chaired it from 1975 to 1994. During that time, Yassin established the Social Studies Unit.

Yassin was Secretary-General of the Arab Thought Forum in Jordan (1990–1997). He worked as Assistant to the Egyptian Ministry of Foreign Affairs and as Director of the Ministry of Scientific Research. He was a professor of political sociology at the National Center for Social and Criminological Research and as Chairman of the Local Monitoring Committee and was a member of the Supreme Council for Culture.

== Work ==
- Principles of Social Research (original: Usus al-baḥth al-ijtimaāʻī) (1963)
- Social Analysis of Research (original: at-fẖlīl aliǧtīmāʿī līl adb) (1970)
- The Arab Personality: Between Self-Image and the Concept of the Other (original: Aš-šẖṣīa alʿrabīa: bayn ṣōrt Aḏ-ḏāt wmfhōm alāẖir) (1973)
- Zionism: A Racist Ideology (original: Aṣ-ṣohiōnīā: āīdoyoloǧiya ʿnṣorīa) (1977)
- Contemporary Criminal Policy: An Analytical Study of Social Defense Theory (original: al-Siyāsah al-jināʼīyah al-muʻāṣirah: dirāsah taḥlīlīyah li-naẓarīyat al-difāʻ al-ijtimāʻī) (1977)
- Studies in Criminal Behavior (original: Dirāsāt fī as-solōk al-iǧtimāʿī)
- Egypt Between Crisis and Advancement (original: Misr baina 'l-azma wa-'n-nahḍa)
- Analysis of the Concept of National Thought (original: th-līl mafhōm al-Fkr al-qawmī) (1987)
- Global Transformations and World Future (original: tḥawlāt al-omam wal-mstaqbl al-ʿālamī) (2010)
- Horizons of Knowledge in the Age of Globalization (2011)
- People on the Platform of History (original: al-shaʻb ʻalá minaṣṣat al-tārīkh) (2013)
- The Rise and Fall of Political Islam Movements (original: ṣoʿōd wṣoqōṭ ḥarakāt al-islām as-siyāsī)
- Post-Revolution: Developmental Time and Civilizational Modernization (original: mā bʿd aṯ-ṯawrā: az-zmn at-tanmwī wt-tḥdīṯ alḥḍārī)

== Awards ==
- First Class of the Order of Merit (Jordan, 1992)
- Award for best book in human sciences for his book (Cairo International Book Fair, 1995)
- Medal of Sciences and Arts (Egypt, 1995)
- State Merit Award in Social Sciences (Supreme Council of Culture, Egypt, 1996)
- Sultan Bin Ali Al Owais Cultural Award (United Arab Emirates, 2013)

== Death ==
El Sayed Yassin died at Sheikh Zayed Specialized Hospital in 6 October City in the early morning hours of 19 March 2017.
