= Hasab al-Shaikh Ja'far =

Iraqi poet (1942–2022)

- حسب الشيخ جعفر
- Born: 1942; Amarah
- Died: April 11, 2022 (aged 79–80)
- Occupation: Poet

Hasab al-Sheikh Jaafar (1942 – April 11, 2022) was an Iraqi poet.

== Life ==
He was born in the city of Amarah. He graduated from the Gorky Institute of Literature in Moscow in 1966 with a master's degree in arts. He served as the head of the Cultural Department at Radio Baghdad between 1970 and 1974, worked as an editor at Al-Thawra newspaper, and was a member of the Union of Iraqi Writers. He contributed to Iraqi journalism and attended literary and poetry conferences in Iraq, other Arab countries, and the Soviet Union. His poetry collections include “Nakhlat Allah” (God’s Palm), “Al-Ta’ir Al-Khashabi” (The Wooden Bird), “Ziyarat Al-Sayyida Al-Sumariyya” (Visit from the Sumerian Lady), “A’bar Al-Ha'it fi Al-Mir’a” (Through the Wall in the Mirrord “Fi Mithl Hannou Al-Zawba’a” (As Gentle as the Whirlwind). He also wrote autobiographical works and translated poetry from several Russian poets. In recognition of his poetic contributions, he received the Soviet Peace Prize in 1983 and the Sultan bin Ali Al Owais Cultural Award for Poetry in its eighth session (2002–2003). He died in a hospital in Baghdad on April 11, 2022.
