= Thomas Pavel =

Thomas Pavel (born Toma Pavel, April 4, 1941 in Bucharest, Romania) is a literary theorist, critic, and novelist, who currently is Emeritus professor at the University of Chicago.

== Biography ==
Thomas Pavel received an MA in Linguistics from the University of Bucharest in 1962 and a Doctorat 3e cycle from the École des Hautes Études en Sciences Sociales (EHESS) in Paris, in 1971. He taught at the University of Ottawa from 1971 to 1981, the University of Québec at Montréal from 1981 to 1986, the University of California Santa Cruz from 1986 to 1990, and Princeton University from 1990 to 1998. He was a visiting professor at the University of Amsterdam, Harvard University, University of California, Berkeley, and the École des Hautes Études en Sciences Sociales. From 1998 to 2021, he taught at the University of Chicago, where he was the Gordon J. Laing Distinguished Service Professor in the Committee on Social Thought and the Departments of Romance Languages and Comparative Literature. In 2021 he retired, becoming Emeritus Professor at the University of Chicago.

In 1999, he was elected to the American Academy of Arts and Sciences. He was named Chevalier des Arts et des Lettres in France in 2004 and received the Romanian Order of Cultural Merit in 2011. He held the International Chair at the Collège de France, Paris in 2005-2006 and was a fellow at the Institute of Advanced Studies (Wissenschaftskolleg) in Berlin in 2010–2011. In 2023 he received "Grand prix de la francophonie" (The Prize of Francophony) granted by the Académie Française. In 2025 he was elected to the Romanian Academy.

He received the Quantrell Award in 2007.

== Career ==
=== Studies in narratology ===
Pavel began his scholarly career as a contributor to structuralism and semiotics, two movements that experimented with linguistic techniques in the study of literature. His books La Syntaxe narrative des tragédies de Corneille (1976) and The Poetics of Plot (1985), sketched out a transformational grammar of literary plots inspired by Noam Chomsky's linguistics. A story or a play, he argued, is not a mere succession of pre-established moves, but involves the passage from an initial problem (a transgression or a lack) to a series of successful or unsuccessful solutions. Pavel's model used tree-like structures to represent the links between the challenges faced by the characters and the actions they take. To explain these actions, Pavel's plot-grammar included "maxims" expressing the right or wrong ideals that guide the characters. The plot of Shakespeare's historical tragedies, for instance, wouldn't make sense if the main characters didn't follow the maxim according to which "an earthly crown is the highest good". Pavel also criticized period-style notions, e.g. baroque, showing that they do not always account for the way in which narrative and dramatic plots are structured.

=== An assessment of structuralism ===
While interested in the experimental use of linguistic models in literature, Pavel was opposed to the dogmatic use of structuralism as a universal method for the study of culture. In Le Mirage linguistique (1988), translated and expanded as The Spell of Language (2001), he argued that several major French thinkers (Claude Lévi-Strauss, Jacques Derrida, and Michel Foucault) used linguistic notions in a metaphorical rather than rigorous fashion. In the same vein, in Inflexions de voix (Voice Inflexions) (1976), Pavel describes language as the privileged site of ideals and, at the same time, as the existential proof that humans can rarely fulfill them.

=== Fictional Worlds and literary history ===
Seeking to account, beyond narrative syntax, for the content of literary works, Pavel became interested in the logic of possible worlds, as well as in the philosophy of art and literature. In Fictional Worlds (1986), Pavel pointed out that the general truth of a literary text is not dependent upon the truth of the individual propositions belonging to that text. Reflection on literary fiction doesn't need to identify and eliminate false propositions – as it is necessary to do in history or in science. Literary works are salient structures in which a secondary, fictional world includes entities and states of affairs that lack a correspondent in the basic, primary world. By dividing the universe into sacred and profane areas, the religious mind posits such salient structures; similarly, a work of fiction in which London includes Sherlock Holmes among its inhabitants is fictionally salient with respect to the actual city. Literary texts, Fictional Worlds argues, do not depend on one and only one salient fictional world: they may as well refer to alternative fictional worlds, to the actual world, to active religions or to discarded mythologies. Since literature involves cultural habits and traditions, and obeys specific genre and style constraints, Pavel recommended that fictionality be examined from three points of view: the semantics of salient structures, the pragmatics of cultural traditions, and the stylistics of textual constraints.

Like The Poetics of Plot, Fictional Worlds is critical of historicist generalizations. Discussing the notion of mimetic modes (high, low, ironic) which, according to Northrop Frye, replaced one another during the history of European fiction, Pavel argued that these three modes – and perhaps other modes as well – can be found in virtually all cultures and historical periods.

In L'Art de l'éloignement (The Art of Distance) (1996), his position became more nuanced. The book explores the multiple imaginary worlds put forth by French 17th-century literature, thus rejecting the idea of a homogeneous period-style, sometimes called Zeitgeist or episteme. Pavel claimed, however, that by emphasizing the distance between its fictional worlds and the actual world, 17th-century literature is historically different from the later, 19th -and 20th- century literature, which most often tries to stay as close as possible to its public's experience.

De Barthes à Balzac (From Barthes to Balzac) (1998), co-authored with Claude Bremond, includes a study of Balzac's short story Sarrasine which brings together close reading, structural analysis, and historicist considerations.

=== The appeal of literature: The Lives of the Novel ===
Later, in his Comment écouter la littérature (How to Listen to Literature), Pavel turned his attention to the direct, unproblematic appeal of literary works. The exploration of what makes literary works appealing continued in The Lives of the Novel: A History (2013), a substantially revised version of La Pensée du Roman (2003).

Readers, he now argued, can just listen to literature, instead of studying and over-interpreting it, because literary works, independently of the region and historical period in which they were created, bring out ideals and norms that are accessible to all. The Lives of the Novel narrates the history of the novel from its Ancient Greek origins to the present, based on the assumption that older as well as more recent narratives are all about human beings, their values, their passions, and their actions, thus being comprehensible across the borders of time and cultures. Pavel points out that the genre has always involved a strong debate between the idealization of human action and the critique of its imperfection. 21st-century readers do not live in the Middle Ages, the Renaissance, or the 18th-century, yet, because of this debate, the sublime story of Tristan, the comic one of Don Quixote, and the problematic one of Moll Flanders are still immediately accessible to them. History, Pavel concludes, must be sensitive to the layer of permanence that underlies cultural change.

== Other activities ==
Pavel published two works of fiction: Le Miroir persan (The Persian Mirror), a cycle of stories playing with fictional worlds, and La sixième branche (The Sixth Branch), a novel of love, betrayal, and forgiveness.

He co-founded and co-edited with Mark Lilla the series New French Thought, Princeton University Press (1994 – 2010), dedicated to bringing innovative French intellectual debates to the English-speaking audience. The series issued translations of books by Jacques Bouveresse, Monique Canto-Sperber, Antoine Compagnon, Jean-Pierre Dupuy, Marcel Gauchet, Blandine Kriegel, Gilles Lipovetsky, Pierre Manent, Alain Renaut, Pierre Rosanvallon, and Jean-Marie Schaeffer.

Pavel's works have been published in English, French, Italian, Spanish, Portuguese, Romanian, Russian, Czech, and Japanese.

== Bibliography ==
- Fragmente despre cuvinte.(Essay). Bucharest: Editura pentru literatură, 1968.
- La Syntaxe narrative des tragédies de Corneille: Recherches et propositions. Paris: Klincksieck, 1976.
- Inflexions de voix. (Essay). Montréal: Presses de l'Université de Montréal, 1976.
- Le Miroir persan. (Stories). Paris: Denoël & Montréal: Quinze, 1978.
- The Poetics of Plot: The Case of English Renaissance Drama. Minneapolis: University of Minnesota Press, 1985.
- Fictional Worlds. Cambridge, MA: Harvard University Press, 1986.
- Le Mirage Linguistique, Paris: Minuit, 1988.
- The Feud of Language: A History of Structuralist Thought. Blackwell, 1992, English version of Le Mirage linguistique.
- L'Art de l'éloignement: Essai sur l'imagination classique. Paris: Gallimard, 1996.
- De Barthes à Balzac: Fictions d'un critique et critiques d'une fiction. (With Claude Bremond.) Paris: Albin Michel, 1998.
- The Spell of Language: Poststructuralism and Speculation. Chicago: University of Chicago Press, 2001, revised, expanded version of The Feud of Language.
- La sixième branche. (Novel). Paris: Fayard, 2003.
- La Pensée du roman. Paris: Gallimard, 2003.
- Comment écouter la littérature. Paris: Fayard, 2006.
- The Lives of the Novel: A History. Princeton, NJ: Princeton University Press, 2013, revised, expanded version of La Pensée du roman.
