= Gunnar von Proschwitz =

Swedish Romance philologist (1922–2005)

Gunnar von Proschwitz (29 July 1922 – 5 March 2005) was a Swedish Romance philologist.

von Proschwitz was born in Tölö in Halland. He was a son of Adolf von Proschwitz, a school principal, and Märta Löndén. He grew up in Gothenburg, where he graduated from high school in 1941. He began his studies at the Göteborg University College in the same year, earning his bachelor's degree in 1944, his master's degree in 1946, his licentiate degree in 1946 and finally his PhD in 1958. He then worked as lecturer of French at the university college until 1968, when he was appointed professor of Romance languages, especially French, at Uppsala University, a post he held until 1971. He then returned to Göteborg and served from 1977 to 1988 as professor of Romance languages at the University of Göteborg. In 1987 he served as guest professor at the University of Paris.

von Proschwitz's research interests included 18th century France and its relations with Sweden. He published the correspondence of Carl Gustaf Tessin and a monography on king Gustav III of Sweden, and participated in the Voltaire Foundation's project to publish the complete works of Voltaire.

von Proschwitz was elected member of the Royal Society of Arts and Sciences in Gothenburg in 1964 and became its chairman in 1988. He received the Grand prix de la francophonie in 1999 and the Legion of Honour, and was bestowed an honorary doctorate by Stendhal University.

He died on 5 March 2005 in Göteborg and was buried at Kviberg Cemetery.
