= Salah Fadl =

Egyptian writer and translator (1938–2022)

- Born: 21 March 1938; Shabbas Martyrs, Kafr Elsheikh, Egypt
- Died: 10 December 2022 (aged 84)
- Education: Doctorate of Arts (1972) Mother School. Al-Azhari Institute. Faculty of Science House, Cairo University. Central University of Madrid.
- Title: Occupation Writer, Rector, Dean of Institute, University Professor, Honorary Professor, Visiting Professor, Editor, Consultant. Employee at: Ein Shams University.

Mohamed Salahuddin Abdel-Sameeh Fadl (Arabic:صلاح فضل) (21 March 1938 – 10 December 2022) was an Egyptian academic, writer, and translator from Kafr el Sheikh. He has held many educational and non-educational positions in Egypt and abroad. He worked as a medic at the Cairo University, the Al-Azhar University, the Ain Shams University in Egypt, the National Autonomous University of Mexico, and the College of Mexico in Spain, as well as the University of Sana'a in Yemen and Bahrain. Other non-educational positions held by Dr. Fadl include editing the Journal of the Egyptian Institute of Islamic Studies in Madrid, heading the Department of Arabic at Ain Shams University, other contributions to the Campus Council, and other academic contributions.

== Personal life ==
Fadl was born on 21 March 1938 in the village of Shabbas al-Shouhadaa in Desouk Markaz, Kafr el-Sheikh Governorate.

== Education ==
Fadl completed his primary and secondary education at the Azhariyah seminary. In 1962, he received a degree from the Faculty of the House of Sciences of Cairo University. He undertook a post-graduate mission in Spain and in 1972 he obtained a State Doctor of Arts from the Central University of Madrid.

== Biography ==
Fadl held many teaching positions during his career. From his graduation in 1962, until 1965, he worked as a rector at the Faculty of the House of Sciences. During his time in Spain, he held various positions at the National Autonomous University of Mexico, serving as a teacher of Arabic literature and translation at the Faculty of Philosophy and Literature from 1968 until 1972, establishing the Department of Arabic Language and Literature in 1975, and being nominated as an honorary professor of the University's Department of Higher Studies. Furthermore, he was a visiting professor at the Mexican Graduate School from 1974 to 1977. Salah Fadl held two positions at the Egyptian Institute of Islamic Studies in Madrid, Spain, from 1980 to 1985, serving as its first director, and heading the editorial of the second journal of the institute. After returning from Spain, he served as Professor of Literature and Criticism at the Faculty of Arabic and Girls at Al-Azhar University, and Professor of Literary Criticism and Comparative Literature at the Faculty of Arts at Ain Shams University. He also worked as a visiting professor outside Egypt, at Sana'a University in Yemen and Bahrain until 1994.

Fadl also held non-educational positions. During his tenure as a teacher at the National Autonomous University of Mexico, from 1968 to 1972, he contracted with the Supreme Council for Scientific Research of Spain to contribute to the revival and dissemination of Ibn Rashid's philosophical heritage. When he returned to Egypt, he headed the Department of Arabic at Ain Shams University, from 1979 to the present day. He was appointed the Dean of the Higher Institute of Art Criticism of the Academy of Arts of Egypt from 1985 to 1988, and the Cultural Advisor to Egypt. Salah also has a notable collective activity; he was a member of the Economics Committee, a rapporteur of the Literature Committee, a major entrepreneur working to develop the work of the complex, expand its activity and disseminate his message, and has submitted this project to the Campus Council for approval.

Fadl helped enrich the Arab Library by producing various literature in various fields, including literature, literary criticism, and comparative literature.

Fadl died on 10 December 2022, at the age of 84.

== Opinions ==
"The critic and Dr. Salah Fadl are well–versed in the arts of Arabic literature and his graceful language, which is particularly prominent in his weekly articles published in Al–Ahram. It has also worked hard to follow up on the poetry, story, and play produced by the literature, and to live with all the world's literary trends and critical literary trends," says faculty member, Dr. Mohamed Hassan Abdulaziz.

== Awards ==
- Abdulaziz Saud Al-Babtain Prize for Poetic Criticism – Fifth Session (Ahmed Meshari Al-Adwani Session), Abu Dhabi, October 28–31, 1996.
- State Appreciation Award in Literature, 1999, shared with: Edward Al-Kharrat and Mahmoud Mohamed Fahmy Hegazy.
- Sultan Bin Ali Al Owais Award – Fourteenth Session: 2014–2015, for: Literary and Critical Studies.\

== Works ==
Among the literature published by Salah Fadl are the following:

=== Books ===
- "From the Spanish Romanth: Study and Models, "Egyptian Book General, Cairo, 1974.
- "The Approach to Realism in Literary Creation," Knowledge House, Cairo, 1978.
- "The Theory of Constructivism in Literary Criticism," Sunrise Publishing and Distribution House, Cairo, 1978.
- "The Influence of Islamic Culture in Dante's Divine Comedy," Sunrise Publishing and Distribution House, Cairo, 1980.
- "Science of Style: its Principles and Procedures," Al-Shawab Publishing and Distribution House, Cairo, 1984.
- "Production of literary significance," Moctar Publishing and Distribution, Cairo, 1987.
- "The Moorish Mystic Epic," Spring Publications, Cairo, 1988.
- "Text codes: A Semiotic Study in Poetry, "Batana Publishing and Distribution, Cairo, 1989.
- "Phenomena of Spanish Theatre," Egyptian Writers General, Cairo, 1992.
- "Narrative Methods in Arabic Novel," Range House of Culture and Publishing, Baghdad, 1993.
- "Rhetoric and Text Science," National Council for Culture, Arts and Literature, Kuwait City, 1993.
- "Contemporary Poetic Styles," Literature Publishing and Distribution House, Beirut, 1995.
- "Imaginative Forms of Life and Literature," Egyptian World Publishing Company, Giza, 1995.
- "Methods of Contemporary Criticism," Atlas Publishing and Media Production House, Cairo, 1996.
- "Reading Image and Reading Images," Sunrise Publishing and Distribution House, Cairo, 1996.
- "Ein Moneymoon," Sunrise Publishing and Distribution House, Cairo, 1997.
- "Epics of Poetic Discourse," Family Library, 1998.
- "Critical compositions against the death of the author," Egyptian-Lebanese House, Cairo, 2000.
- "Poetry of the Narrative," Egyptian-Lebanese House, Cairo, 2002.
- "Arab Poetic Transformations," Egyptian Book General, Cairo, 2002.
- "Creativity is a civilizational partnership," General Authority for Culture Palaces, Cairo, 2003.
- "The Rose of the Sea and the Freedom of Female Imagination: A Journey in Haq Sa'ad Al-Sabah, "Jamil Publishing, Distribution and Information House, Cairo, 2004.
- "Events in Literary Thought," Horizon Publishing and Distribution, Cairo, 2004.
- "The Aesthetics of Freedom in Poetry," Atlas Publishing and Media Production, Cairo, 2005.
- "Experience Novella," Atlas Publishing and Media Production, Cairo, 2005.
- Al – Azhar documents. What Appeared and What Belly, "Alternative Publishing and Distribution House, Giza, 2017.

=== Translations ===
Spanish plays translated by Salah Fadl:

- "Life is a dream" by Pedro Calderón de la Barca (original title: Life's a Dream, 1978.
- "Star of Seville" by Lope de Vega, Ministry of Information, Kuwait City, 1979.
- "The Double Story of Dr. Palmi" by Antonio Boero Baiejo (original title: La doble historia del doctor Valmy), Ministry of Information, Kuwait City, 1974.
- "Dream of the Mind: History of Philosophy from the Greek Age to the Renaissance" by Antonio Boero Baiejo, Indaoui Foundation for Education and Culture, Cairo, 1975.
- "The Legend of Don Quechot" by Antonio Boero Baiejo, Ministry of Information, Kuwait City, 1979.
- "The Arrival of the Gods" by Antonio Boero Baiejo, Egyptian Book General, Cairo, 1977.

== Other academic activities ==
- Participation in the Supreme Executive Committee of the Congress of Revelers held in Mexico, 1975.
- Co-founder of the "Chapters" literary critique magazine and served as deputy editor at various intervals, 1980–1990.
- Selected honorary member of the Spanish Historical Academic Society.
- Co-founder and president of the Egyptian Society for Literary Criticism since 1989.
- Member of the Higher Council for Culture and Information of the specialized national councils.
- Member of the Culture and Literature Divisions.
- He served as a member of the Higher Scientific Committee for the Promotion of Professors at Egyptian Universities.
- Served as Chairman of the Scientific Committee of the Encyclopedia of Information of Arab and Muslim Scholars and Scholars of the Arab Educational, Cultural and Scientific Organization.
- Consultant, Alexandria Library, 2003.
- Election to the Egyptian Scientific Complex, 2005.
- His election as a member of the Arabic Language Complex at the location other than the death of Dr. Badawi Tabana, 2003.
- Supervision of a group of chains in the Egyptian General Authority for Writers, such as: Literature studies, literature critics.
- Contribution to and management of a number of scientific and critical conferences in Egypt, Spain and Bahrain.
- Participation in Arab scientific meetings.
