= Abdelfattah Kilito =

Moroccan writer (born 1945)

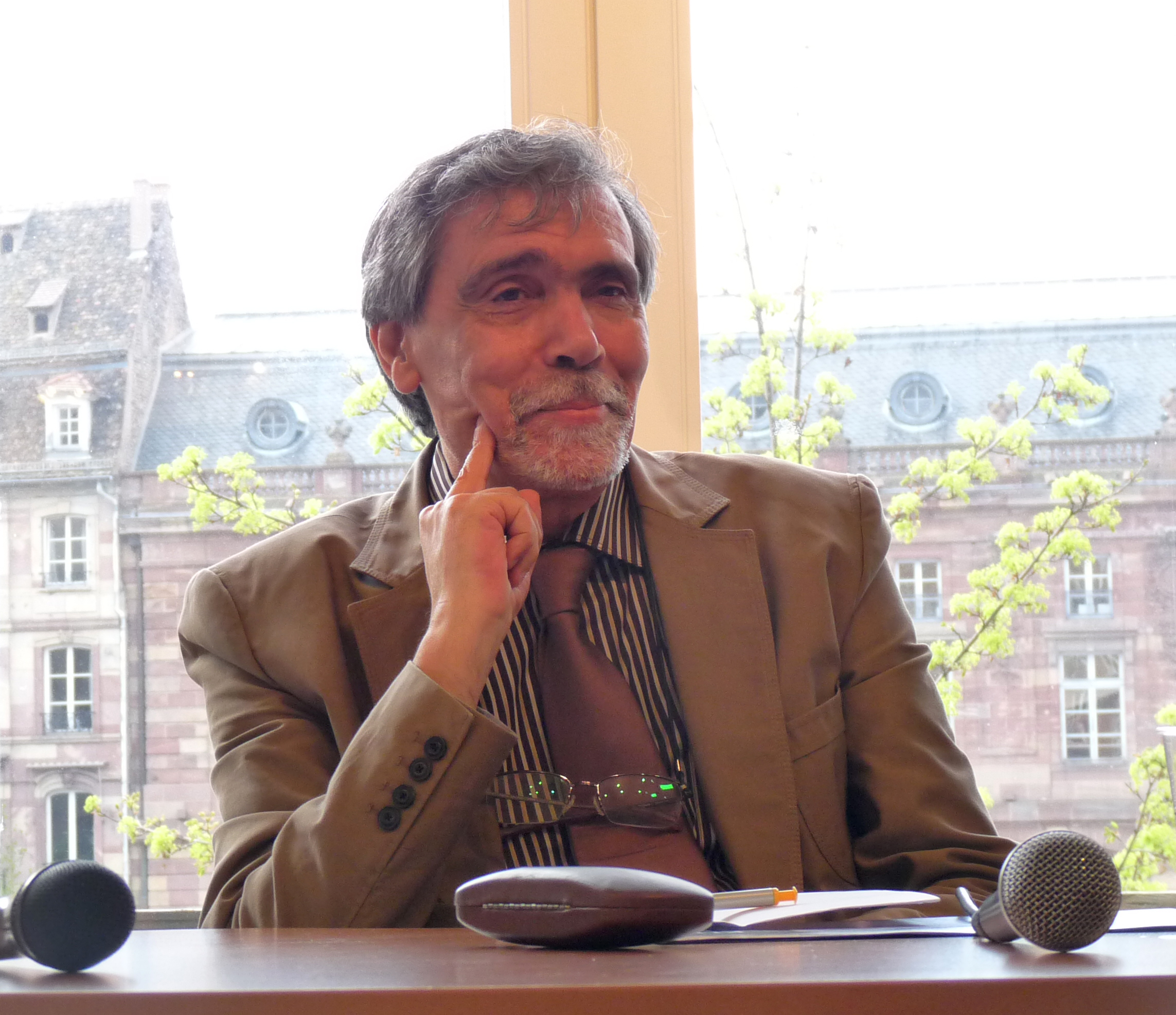
- Native name: عبد الفتاح كيليطو
- Born: 10 April 1945 (age 81) Rabat, Morocco
- Occupation: Writer
- Notable works: Thou Shalt Not Speak My Language; The Author and His Doubles: Essays on Classical Arabic Culture)
- Notable awards: Al Owais Award 2006–2007

Abdelfattah Kilito (Arabic: عبد الفتاح كيليطو, romanized: ʿAbd al-Fattāḥ Kīlīṭū; born 10 April 1945, in Rabat) is a Moroccan literary scholar and writer. He is the author of several books in Arabic and in French. He has also written articles for magazines such as Poétique and Studia Islamica. Some of the awards Kilito has won are the Great Moroccan Award (1989), the Atlas Award (1996), the French Academy Award (le prix du Rayonnement de la langue française) (1996), Sultan Al Owais Prize for Criticism and Literature Studies (2006) and Grand prix de la francophonie (2024).

== Life ==
Kilito was born in 1945 in Rabat, Morocco. He was raised in the medina of Rabat. Apart from his native Moroccan Arabic, Kilito learned French from the age of six. He also studied German and was trained as a scholar of classical Arabic literature in the Faculty of Literature at the Mohammed V University, where he later became professor.

== Bibliography ==
=== By Kilito ===
- al-Adab wa-l-gharāba [Literature and Wonder] (in Arabic). Beirut: Dār al-Ṭalīʿa. 1982.
- Les séances: récits et codes culturels chez Hamadhânî et Harîrî (in French). Sindbad. 1983. ISBN 978-2-7274-0086-8.
- L'Auteur et ses doubles: Essai sur la culture arabe classique (in French). Éditions du Seuil. 1985. ISBN 9782020069656.
  - The Author and His Doubles: Essays on Classical Arabic Culture. Translated by Michael Cooperson. Syracuse University Press. 2001. ISBN 978-0-8156-2936-8.
- La querelle des images: roman (in French). Eddif. 1995. ISBN 978-2-908801-77-4.
  - The Clash of Images. Translated by Robyn Creswell. New Directions Publishing. 2010. ISBN 978-0-8112-1886-3.
- al-Ghāʾib: Dirāsa fī maqāmāt al-Ḥarīrī [The absent: A study in Al-Harīrī's Maqāmāt] (in Arabic). Casablanca: Dār Tūbqāl. 1987.
- al-Ḥikāya wa-l-ta‌ʾwīl: dirāsāt fī al-sard al-ʻArabī [The Story and the Interpretation: Studies in Arab Narrative] (in Arabic). Casablanca: Dār Tūbuqāl. 1988.
- L'oeil et l'aiguille: essai sur Les milles et une nuits [The Eye and the Needle, a Study on One Thousand and One Nights] (in French). Paris: La découverte. 1992.
- La langue d'Adam: et autres essais (in French). Casablanca: Toubkal. 1995.
  - The Tongue of Adam. Translated by Robyn Creswell. New Directions Publishing. 2016. ISBN 978-0811224932
- Lan tatakallama lughatī (in Arabic). Beirut: Dār al-Ṭalīʻah. 2002.
  - Thou Shalt Not Speak My Language. Translated by Wail S. Hassan. Syracuse University Press. 2008. ISBN 978-0-8156-3191-0.
- Le Cheval de Nietzsche: récits [Nietzsche’s Horse] (in French). Casablanca: Editions le Fennec. 2007. ISBN 978-9954-415-62-7.
- Al-Adab wa al Irtiyab. Casablanca. 2007.
- Dites-moi le songe [Tell Me of the Vision] (in French). Paris: Sindbad/Actes Sud. 2010.
- Les Arabes et l'art du récit: une étrange familiarité (in French). Paris: Sindbad/Actes Sud. 2009. ISBN 978-2-7427-8110-2.
  - Arabs and the Art of Storytelling: A Strange Familiarity. translated by Mbarek Sryfi and Eric Sellin. New York: Syracuse University Press. 2014. ISBN 978-0-8156-5286-1.
- Je parle toutes les langues, mais en arabe [I Speak All Languages, but in Arabic] (in French). Sindbad-Actes Sud. 2013. ISBN 978-2-330-01634-0.
- Bi Hibr Khafiyy [With Invisible Ink]. Toubkal. 2018. ISBN 9789954659489.
- Fi Jaw mina al-Nadam Al-Fikri [In an environment of Intellectual remorse] (in Arabic). Almutawassit Books. 2020. ISBN 9788832201789.
- Wallah Ina Hazihi al-Hikaya Lahikayati [By God, This Story Is My Story] (in Arabic). Almutawassit Books. 2021. ISBN 9788832201994.
- Attakhali 'an al 'Adab [Abandoning Literature] (in Arabic). Almutawassit Books. 2022. ISBN 979-12-80738-59-2.

=== On Kilito ===
- Abdelhaq Anoun, Abdelfattah Kilito: les origines culturelles d'un roman maghrébin, Harmattan, Collection Critiques Littéraires, 2004, ISBN 2-7475-6841-5

== Awards and honors ==
Year	Award	For	Reference
2024	Grand prix de la francophonie		
2023	King Faisal Prize for Arabic Language and Literature	classical Arabic narrative and modern theories	
2006-7	Al Owais Award	Criticism & Literature Studies	
1996	French Academy Award		
1989	Great Moroccan Award		
