= Grand prix de la francophonie =

French language award

The Grand Prix de la francophonie is presented annually by the Académie française at the initiative of the Canadian Government to a personality who contributes to the development of the French language throughout the world.

== Laureates ==
- 1986: Georges Schehadé
- 1987: Yoichi Maeda
- 1988: Jacques Rabemananjara
- 1989: Hubert Reeves
- 1990: Albert Cossery
- 1991: Léon-Joseph Suenens
- 1992: Khac Vien Nguyen and Maurice Métral and Stig Strömholm
- 1993: Henri Lopes
- 1994: Mohammed Dib
- 1995: Salah Stétié
- 1996: Abdou Diouf
- 1997: Abdellatif Berbich
- 1998: Jean Starobinski
- 1999: Gunnar von Proschwitz
- 2000: Giovanni Macchia
- 2001: François Cheng
- 2002: Bronislaw Geremek
- 2003: Édouard J. Maunick
- 2004: Albert Memmi
- 2005: Jane Conroy
- 2006: Roland Mortier
- 2007: Élie Barnavi
- 2008: Lide Tan
- 2009: Thomas W. Gaehtgens
- 2010: Jean Métellus
- 2011: Abdellatif Laâbi and Dariush Shayegan
- 2012: Dariush Shayegan and Michèle Rakotoson
- 2013: Qiang Dong and Boualem Sansal
- 2014: Georges Banu and Fouad Laroui
- 2015: Gabriel Garran and Aminata Sow Fall
- 2016: Takeshi Matsumura and Stromae
- 2017: François Boustani and Tierno Monénembo
- 2018: Kamel Daoud and Michel Tremblay
- 2019: Petr Král and Abdeljalil Lahjomri and Jean Pruvost
- 2020: Lise Gauvin and Alexandre Najjar
- 2021: Frankétienne and Abdourahman Waberi
- 2022 Trinh Xuan Thuan and French-language daily newspaper “L’Orient-Le Jour”
- 2023 Thomas Pavel and Camille Limoges
- 2024 Abdelfattah Kilito and Edwin M. Duval
