= Nabil Suleiman =

Syrian writer and literary critic

- نبيل سليمان
- Born: 1945 (age 80–81); Safita, Syria
- Citizenship: Syria
- Education: Damascus University
- Occupation: Writer

Nabil Suleiman (Arabic: نبيل سليمان; born 1945 in Safita, Syria) is a Syrian writer and literary critic.

== Life ==
Suleiman graduated in Arabic language and literature from the University of Damascus in 1967 and later worked as a teacher from 1963 to 1979. Dar Al-hwar for Publishing and Distribution was founded by him in 1982 in Latakia, he has been writing since 1989 as member of the tale and Fiction Society. Some of his works have been translated into Russian, Spanish and English. and many studies have been written on his literature, most notably Muhammed Jamal barut “Novel and History”, Mohsen Yusif's "Towards an Arab Fiction Epic" and Muiven Mustafa's "Shaping Fiction Components". In 2001, the author was attacked, told of political objectives. The President of the Federation denied this and the author was attacked once more in 2011.

== Works ==
- The flood mourns, (original title: yndāḥ ālṭwfān),1970, Novel.
- The prison, (original title: ālsǧn),1972, Novel.
- The Summer Snow, (original title: ṯlǧ ālṣyf),1973, Novel.
- Literature and ideology in Syria (original title: ālādb w ālāydwlwǧyā fy swryā) (jointly with Bo Ali Yassin),1974.
- (original title: Ǧrmāty),1977, Novel.
- Feminism in Textbook, (original title: ālnswyā fy ālktāb ālmdrsy),1978, Study.
- Literary criticism in Syria, (original title: ālnqd ālādby fy swryā),1-1979.
- Cultural battles in Syria (original title: mʿārk ṯqāfyā fy swryā) (jointly with Bo Ali Yassin and Mohamed Kamel al-Khatib),1979.
- Marxism and Arab-Islamic Heritage (original title: ālmārksyā w āltrāṯ ālʿrby ālēslāmy),1980.
- Obelisk (original title: ālmslā),1981, Novel.
- Syrian Novel, (original title: ālrwāyā ālswryā),1983, Study.
- Contribution to criticism of literature, (original title: msāhmā fy ālnqd ālādby),1983, Study.
- Self-awareness and the world, (original title: wʿy ālḏāt w ālʿālm),1985, Study.
- Early defeats, (original title: hāzāēm mbkrā),1985, Study.
- Questions of realism and commitment, (original title: Āsēlā ālwāqʿyā w ālēltzām),1985, Study.
- Qais Weeping, (original title: qys ybky),1988, Story.
- In creativity and criticism, (original title: fy ālābdāʿ w ālnqd),1989, Study.
- Orbits of the East, (original title: mdārāt ālšrq),1993, Novel.
- Sedition of Narrative and Criticism, (original title: ftnāẗ ālsrd w ālnqd),1994.
- Thrones of the Throne, (original title: āṭyāf ālʿrš),1995, Novel
- Dialogues and testimonies (original title: ḥwārāt w šhādāt),1995.
- Culture between darkness and peace, (original title: ālṯqāfā byn ālẓlām w ālslām),1996.
- Reader's biography, (original title: syrāẗ ālqārēʾ),1996.
- As a narrative Statement, (original title: bmṯābẗ ālbyān ālrwāʾy),1998.
- The metaphor of love, (original title: mǧāz ālʿšq),1998, Novel.
- In her absence, (original title: fy ġyābhā), 2009.
- (original title: Dlʿwn), 2010, Novel.
- Bunk Stone, (original title: ḥǧr ālsrāʾr), 2010.
- (original title: Mdāḏn ālārǧwn), 2013.
- Al-Sham Murals (original title: ǧdāryāt ālšām) (Namnuma), 2014.
- History of Extinguished Eyes, (original title: tāryẖ ālʿywn ālmṭfʾā) 2019, Novel.

== Awards ==
Nabil Suleiman won the award for the story, novel and theatrical category on the Awards ceremony that was held in Dubai, On 02 March 2022, the 17th Sultan bin Ali Al Owais Cultural Foundation.

== See also ==
- Syrian literature
