= Muhammad Khudayyir =

Iraqi writer

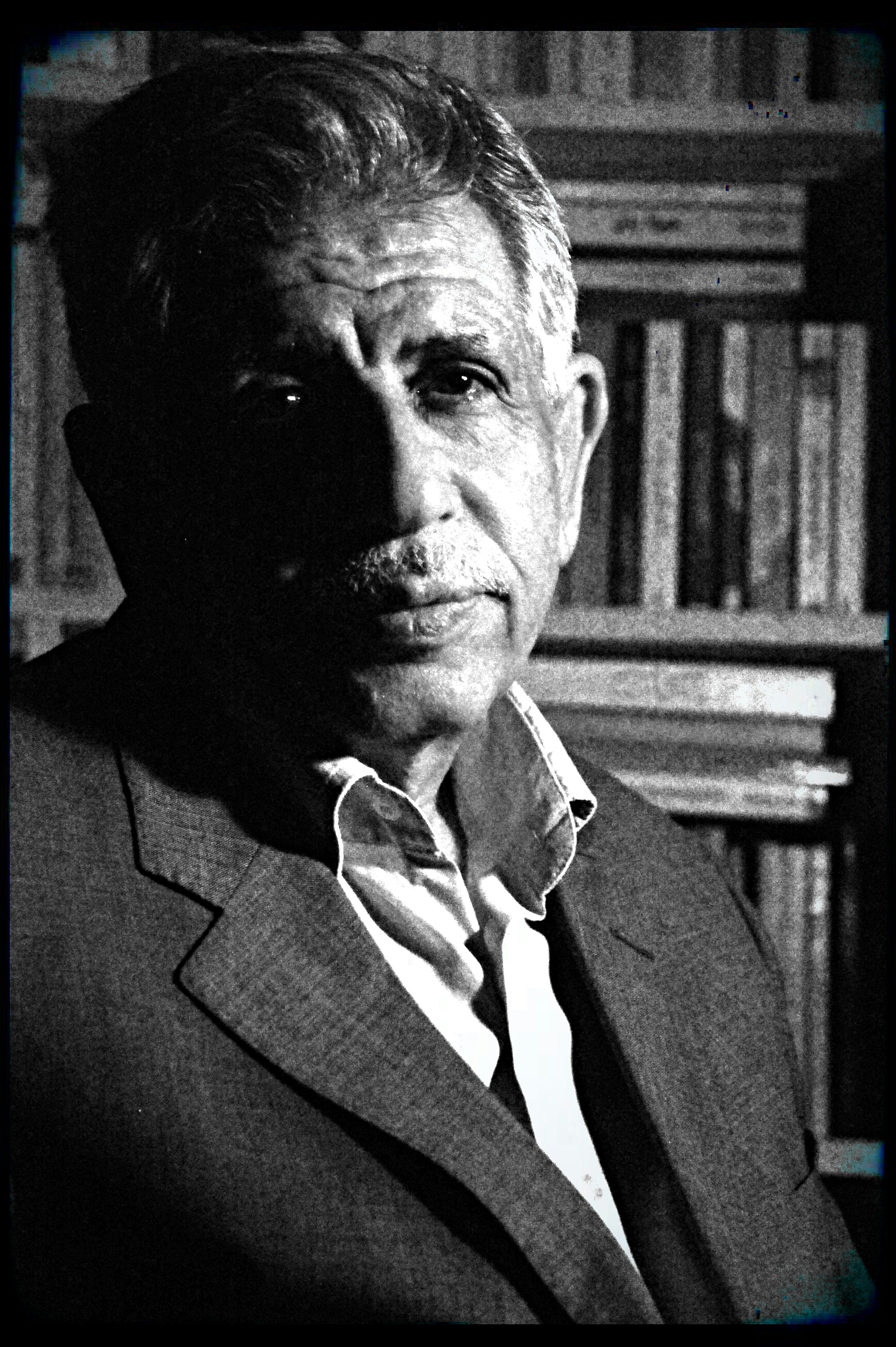
- Born: 1942 (age 83–84); Basra, Iraq
- Occupation: Author
- Awards: Sultan Bin Ali Al Owais Cultural Award

Muhammad Khudayyir (born 1942) is an Iraqi writer. He was born in Basra where he still lives. He is mainly known as a writer of short stories, having published several collections till date. These include Black Kingdom and Vision of Autumn. In 2004, Khudayyir won the Sultan Bin Ali Al Owais Cultural Award for his contribution to literature. Basrayatha, a fictional memoir of his native city, has been translated into English by William Hutchins.
