= Habib Al Sayegh =

Emirati writer and poet (1955–2019)

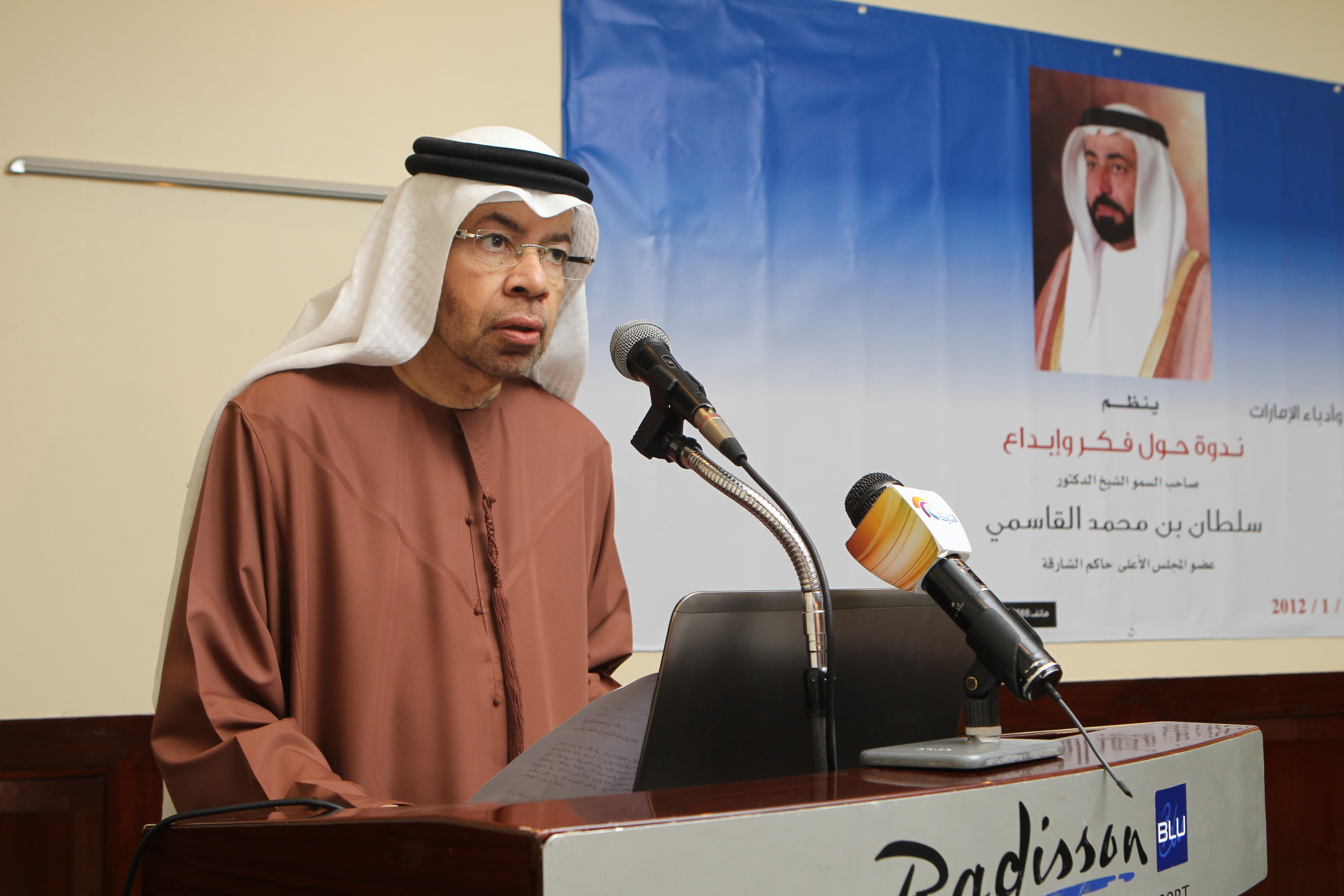
- Born: February 8, 1955; Abu Dhabi; United Arab Emirates
- Died: August 20, 2019 (aged 64)
- Education: University of London
- Occupations: Poet; writer; journalist
- Board member of: Emirates Writers Union

Habib Yousef Abdullah Al Sayegh (Arabic: حبيب الصايغ) (February 8, 1955 – August 20, 2019) was an Emirati poet and writer. He was born in Abu Dhabi and obtained his Bachelor’s degree in Philosophy in 1977, as well as a Master’s degree in Comparative Linguistics and Translation in 1998 from the University of London. He worked in the fields of media and culture, as he was the Editor-in-Chief of Al Khaleej Newspaper. He was the Chair of the Board of Directors of the Emirates Writers Union, and the first Khaliji to become Secretary-General of the Arab Writers Union.

Al Sayegh had had a daily column in Al Khaleej newspaper, and he published his works at an early age. He participated in many Arab and international conferences and seminars. He produced ten poetry collections, and his poems have been translated to English, French, German, Italian, Spanish and Chinese. Al Sayegh died on August 20, 2019, and at the age of 64.

In recognition of Al Sayegh’s role in journalism and literature, the Board of Directors of the UAE Association of Journalists named the Library of the Association’s headquarters in Dubai after him.

== Early life ==
Habib al-Sayegh was born in Abu Dhabi. He joined Al-Ittihad newspaper when he was 15 years old. In 1977, he obtained a Bachelor’s degree in Philosophy in 1977, as well as a Master’s degree in Comparative Linguistics and Translation in 1998 from the University of London.

== Poetry ==
He wrote classical Arabic poetry, such as “vertical poetry” (Arabic: الشعر العمودي) and “tafila” (Arabic: التفعيلة) as well as prose. In 1980, the first poetry collection of Al Sayegh's Here is the Bar of Bani Abs Tribe, Open House was published. In the following year, he published his second poetry collection, The Final Statement by the Official Spokesman for Himself. In 1982 he published Poems to Beirut and followed it with Mayari in 1983. Features was published in 1986 and Poems following the Rhythm of the Sea in 1993. Both The Rose of Old Age and Tomorrow were published in 1995. Broken Rhythm followed in 2011, and in 2012 he published A Graph for Towers of Giraffes and I Call Death “My Son”.

== Awards ==
- In 2004 he received the Taryam Omran Award (the pioneers of the press category).
- He was also honored by the Journalists Association in 2006 as the first to spend 35 years in the national press field.
- In 2007 he received the State Merit Prize in literature, and it was the first time to be awarded to a poet.
- He won Al Owais Cultural Award in the “poetry” category in 2014-2015.

== Previous positions ==
1. Editor-in-Chief of “Literary Affairs” published by the Emirates Writers Union, for the issues from 58 to 62 and 71 to 72.
2. Director of Internal Media at the Ministry of Information and Culture in 1977.
3. Deputy Editor-in-Chief of Al-Ittihad newspaper in 1978.
4. Founder and Editor-in-Chief of “Awraq” cultural magazine from 1982 to 1995.
5. Chairman of the National Committee for Ethical Journalism in the UAE.
6. Vice Chairman of the Committee for Emiratization and Human Resources Development in the State media sector.
7. General Director of the Sultan Bin Zayed Centre for Culture and Media.
8. Board Member of Emirates Heritage Club, Chairman of the Committee on Information and Public Relations at the Club, and General Supervisor of “Torath” (Heritage) monthly magazine, which is issued by the Centre.
9. Head of the Administrative Council of Abu Dhabi Theatre.
10. Head of the Administrative Council of “Bait Al Shi’r” (House of Poetry) magazine.
11. Head of the UAE delegation to the Civil Society Forum for the Future.
12. Journalist and columnist who contributed to journalism in the UAE from its early beginnings. His daily column, which was first published in February 1978, continued until his passing.
13. He edited the first page dedicated to promising journalistic talents in the UAE (Al-Ittihad newspaper – Pen Club – 1978) and established the first cultural supplement in the UAE (Al Fajr newspaper – 1980).
14. Advisor and Editor-in-Chief of Al Khaleej newspaper.
15. Secretary-General of the Arab Writers Union, and editor-in-chief of “The Arab Writer” magazine, issued by the Union since December 2015 and until his death.
16. Chairman of the Board of Directors of the Emirates Writers Union since 2009 and until his death.

== Works ==
- Here is the Bar of Bani Abs Tribe, Open House (1980)
- The Final Statement by the Official Spokesman for Himself (1981)
- Poems to Beirut (1982)
- Mayari (1983)
- Features (1986)
- Poems following the Rhythm of the Sea (1993)
- The Rose of Old Age (1995)
- Tomorrow (1995)
- A Graph for Towers of Giraffes (2011)
- Broken Rhythm (2011)
- Complete Poetical Works – Part One (2012)
- Complete Poetical Works – Part Two (2012)

== Death and subsequent allegations ==
In October 2026, investigative journalist Matthew Cole alleged in his book Princes and Thieves that Emirati security officers had detained, tortured and killed Al Sayegh in August 2019, shortly after he published a column criticizing the normalization of relations with Israel. On 29 October 2026, the human rights organization Democracy for the Arab World Now (DAWN) called on three United Nations special rapporteurs to investigate the circumstances of his death. DAWN stated that it had not independently verified Cole's allegations.
