= Hilmi Salim =

Egyptian poet and critic

- Born: 1951; Monufia, Egypt
- Died: 28 July 2012 (aged 60–61)
- Education: BA in Journalism
- Alma mater: Cairo University
- Occupations: Writer, critic, poet

Hilmi Salem (Arabic:حلمي سالم) was an Egyptian poet. He was born in 1951 (in Menofia Governorate in Egypt) and died on 28 July 2012.

== Education and career ==
He is considered one of the most prominent poets in Egypt in the 1970s. He completed a BA (Journalism) at Cairo University, and he worked as a journalist for Al-Ahali newspaper published in Cairo, and the editor-in-chief of the Egyptian Cultural Intellectual and Literature Magazine. And the Editor-in-chief of the Rainbow Cultural Magazine. He is the received the 2006 Excellence Award in Literature for his entire literary work. Hilmi Salem associated with the poetic group "Illumination", which was accompanied by "Aswat"/(voices), one of the most famous poetry factions in the seventies, and among its poets Hilmi Salem, Hassan Talab, Jamal Al-Qassas, Rifaat Salam, Amjad Rayan and Mahmoud Naseem.

== The Balcony of Laila Murad ==
In the winter of 2007, he published a poem entitled "Leila Murad's Balcony" that had previously been published in his poetry collection entitled "Praising of weakness" in the Cairo art magazine "Ibdaa" headed by the poet Ahmed Abdel Moati Hegazy. However, at that time, the head of the Egyptian General Book Authority issued a decision to withdraw copies of the issue from the market when he saw that some of the poem's contents "offends the divine self." As a result, the Islamic Research Academy (one of Al-Azhar institutions) accused him of "atheism and blasemphy" and he was to be subjected to a campaign calling for his "repentance", after a statement of the matter was signed by about a hundred Islamic personalities, only to be criticized by Egyptian intellectuals, describing it as "an apostasy campaign and the culture of terror". In April 2008, the Egyptian Administrative Court issued a court ruling demanding the Ministry of Culture not to award the Excellence Award to the poet Hilmi Salem, on the grounds that he insulted the divine self.

Then Sheikh Youssef Al-Badri, a member of the Islamic Research Academy of Al-Azhar, filed a lawsuit against the Egyptian Minister of Culture Farouk Hosni and the Secretary-General of the Supreme Council for Culture Ali Abu Shady, asking them to implement the decision to withdraw the award given to Hilmi Salem. However, as was mentioned in Al-Hayat newspaper, the implementation of the decision was "ruled out" on the grounds that none of Farouk Hosni and Ali Abu Shadi issued a decision granting Hilmi Salem the prize, since the decision came from a specialized committee in the Supreme Council of Culture and based on a voting process among the members of the Council. Later in the same month, the Supreme Council of Culture appealed the court's decision, and the Secretary-General of the Supreme Council of Culture described the appeal as a "call for enlightenment and the fight against obscurantism that stops all creative work."

From his side, Hilmi Salem said that he did not ask the Ministry of Culture to appeal the ruling or appeal, adding that he "believes that he has already won the award". In his response about the accusation that the poem offends the divine self, Salem denied the accusation, adding. In the poem, I criticized the Muslims ’dependence on God and their inactivity. This is a religious meaning mentioned in the Holy Qur’an, where the Almighty God said (God does not change the condition of a people until they change what they are themselves) .. The poem said this meaning in a simple poetic form, which is not used by all those who read literature a narrow literal reading ...".

== Books ==
- Culture under Siege (Beirut) 1984
- Chord and Players 1990
- Come to the Father: Essays on Discrimination and Receipt in Poetry, 1992
- Living the Right Way 1998
- Wisdom of the Egyptians (jointly) 2000
- Modernity is the Sister of Tolerance: Contemporary Arabic Poetry and Human Rights 2001
- Good Morning, Winged Falcon: A Study of Amal Dunqul's Poetry
- Silencer Culture 2003
- Lebanon's Flaming Summer 2007
- Aiming at the Brain: Words on Freedom and Repression.
- Leila Mourad's Balcony Trial

== Collection of his Diwan Poetry ==
Hilmi Salem has more than 18 poetry collections, including:

- My Love is Planted in the Earth's Blood 1974
- Alexandrian Is Pain 1981
- The Middeteranian1984
- Biography of Beirut 1986
- Biological and Neighboring 1988
- The Maze and the Brutal Summer 1990
- Jurisprudence of Pleasure 1992
- Endocardium and Maryamata, 1994
- Knitted Mirage 1996
- The One One 1997
- There are Blind People Here, 2001
- Holy Stone Greetings 2003
- Armed Love 2005
- Lady of the well’s Birthday 2005
- Brain stroke Pros, 2006
- Pigeon on Bint Jbeil 2007
- Praising Vulnerability 2007

== Some of his Poems ==
- Liver
- Last vision
- Alternative
- Presence
- Difficult
