= Yumna Tarif Khuli =

Egyptian writer and professor

- يمنى طريف الخولي
- Born: August 31, 1955 (age 70); Egypt
- Education: Bachelor degree in Philosophy of science Master in Philosophy Doctorate degree in Philosophy
- Alma mater: Cairo University
- Title: Professor
- Awards: Abdul Hameed Shoman Foundation Prize for Young Arab Scholars in the Field of Human Sciences

Yumna Tarif Khuli (Arabic: يمنى طريف الخولي) (born August 31, 1955) is Professor of Philosophy of Science and Head of the Philosophy Department at the Faculty of Arts, Cairo University. She has contributed the spread of scientific culture and the origins of scientific and rational thinking. She published several articles, TV programs and public lectures.

== Academic qualifications ==
- BA, with Honors, in the Department of Philosophy, Faculty of Arts, Cairo University, 1977.
- Master of Philosophy on the subject of Philosophy of Science for Karl Popper: A theory on distinguishing scientific knowledge, under the supervision of Prof. Dr. Amira Helmy Matar, Cairo University, 1981.
- PhD, with first class honors, on the subject of indeterminism in contemporary science and the problem of freedom, supervised by Prof. Amira Helmy Matar, Cairo University, 1985.

== Career ==
- Lecturer, Department of Philosophy, Faculty of Arts, Cairo University, in 1977.
- Philosophy Assistant teacher, Faculty of Arts, Cairo University, 1981.
- Philosophy teacher, Faculty of Arts, Cairo University, 1985.
- Assistant professor, since 23 October 1991.
- Professor, since July 30, 1999.

== Organizations ==
- Member of the History and Philosophy of Science Committee at the Academy of Scientific Research.
- Member of the Board of Directors of the Egyptian Philosophical Society.
- Member of the Egyptian Society for the History of Science.
- Member of the Board of Directors of the Nursing Research and Development Center.
- Member of the Philosophy Committee of the Supreme Council of Culture.

== Conferences ==
She participated in many conferences, including:

- The Third International Conference of Al-Andalus Civilization at Cairo University, 1992.
- The First International Philosophy Conference at Kuwait University, 2001.
- Arab Women and Creativity Conference in Cairo, the Supreme Council for Culture, 2002.

== Works ==
She has many books, translations, and studies that are published, including:

- "Human Freedom and Science: A Philosophical Problem", (original text: Alhuriyat Al'iinsania walelm: Mushkilat Falsafia) 1990.
- "Physics in Theology: From Past to Present", 1995, 2nd Edition (original text: altabieiat fi eilm alkilam: min almadi 'iilaa alhadir) 1998.
- "Research in the history of science among the Arabs", (original text: bihawth fi tarikh aleulum eind alarab) 1998.
- "Time in Philosophy and Science", (original text: alzaman fi alfalsafa walealam) 1999.
- "Amin ElKhouly and the Philosophical Dimensions of Renewal", (original text: 'amin alkhuli wal'abead alfalasafia liltajdid) Cairo, 2000.
- "Philosophy of Science in the Twentieth Century: Origins Harvest Future Prospects, World of Knowledge Series", (original text: falisifat aleilm fi alqarn aleshryn: al'usul alhsad alafaq almustaqbaliatu, silsilat ealam almaerifa) 2000.
- "Science, Alienation, and Freedom: An Essay on the Philosophy of Science from Determinism to Indeterminism", (original text: aleilm walaightirab walhurya: maqal fi falsifat aleilm min alhatmia 'iilaa alllahitamia) Cairo, 2000.
- "The Human Sciences Problem", (original text: mushkilat aleulum al'iinsania)1st Edition 1990, 5th Edition 2002.
- "The Scientific Revolution from a cognitive Perspective", (original text: althawra aleilmia min man'dur maerifii) Cairo, 2003.
- "The Philosophy of Karl Popper: The Methodology of Science, The Logic of Science", (original text: falisifat karl bwbr: munhaj alealm, mantiq aleilm) Cairo, 1st Edition 1989, 2nd Edition 2003.
- A translation of "The Frame Myth: In Defense of Science and Rationality, authored by: Karl Popper", Silsilat ealam almuerifa, (original text: 'usturat al'itar: fi difae ean aleilm waleaqlania) Kuwait, 2003.
- "The Femininity of Science: Science from the Perspective of Feminist Philosophy, authored by: Linda Jane Shepherd", Silsilat ealam almuerifa, (original text: anthawyat alelm: aleilm min man'dur alfalsifa alnaswia) Kuwait, 2004.
- "Religious Existentialism: A Study in the Philosophy of Paul Tillich", (original text: alwujudia aldiyny: dirasat fi filsifat Paul Tillich", Cairo, 1st Edition 1998, 3rd Edition 2007.
- "Pillars in Philosophy of Politics", (original text: rakayiz fi falsifat alsiyasa) 2008.

== Awards and honors ==
- Shaykh Mustafa Abd al-Rizq Prize from Cairo University, 1981
- Dr. Zaki Naguib Mahmoud Award for Academic Excellence for Master's and PhD dissertations in 1985-1981
- Abdul Hameed Shoman Foundation Prize for Young Arab Scholars in the Field of Human Sciences, 1990
- Certificate of Appreciation from the President of the Republic for the best book issued, 1999
- Medal of the College of Humanities and Social Sciences, United Arab Emirates University, 2002.
- Cairo University Appreciation Award in the field of Human Sciences, 2016.
