= Ali Ja'far al-Allaq =

Iraqi poet and literary critic

- علي جعفر العلاق
- Born: 1945 (age 80–81); Kut, Wasit, Kingdom of Iraq
- Education: Al-Mustansiriya University, University of Exeter
- Occupations: Poet; Literary critic; Academic
- Writing career
- Language: Arabic, English
- Website: alallak.com

Ali Ja'far al-Allaq (Arabic: علي جعفر العلاق, romanized: ʻAlī Jaʻfar al-ʻAllāq; born 1945) is an Iraqi poet, literary critic and academic. He graduated from the universities of Al-Mustansiriya in 1973, and Exeter in 1984. He held many administrative and academic positions, and wrote several collections of poetry and important critical studies, which had an important role in the modern Iraqi poetic movement.

== Biography ==
Ali Ja'far al-Allaq was born in Kut, Wasit in 1945. He completed his secondary education in Baghdad, received his BA in Arabic literature from Al-Mustansiriya University in 1973, and doctorate in criticism and modern literature from the University of Exeter in Britain, 1984.

During his academic career, he worked as a teacher at Al-Mustansiriya University and Baghdad University from 1985 to 1991, Sana'a University 1991-1997, and United Arab Emirates University 1997-2015. He worked in literary journalism as an editor in the Al-Aqdam al-Adabiyah magazine since 1970, then worked as a secretary for the magazine Al-Aqdam in 1978, and its editor-in-chief from 1984 to 1990. He has written many researches and critical articles in newspapers, in Arabic and English. He also served as Director of Theaters and Folklore for the Ministry of Culture in Iraq, 1976-1978. A member of The General Union of Arab Writers, the Union of Iraqi Writers and the Association of Literary Critics in Iraq, he has participated in many cultural and poetry festivals in Arab countries, Britain, the Soviet Union, Yugoslavia and Bulgaria.

== Works ==
A collection poetic works of Allaq were published in 1998 by Arab Institute for Research and Publishing in Beirut, then in 2014 in two volums by Dar Fada'at, Amman. Among his poetry collections, are:

- Arabic: لا شيء يحدث .. لا أحد يجيء, romanized: Lā shayʾ yaḥduth-- lā aḥad yajīʾ, 1973
- Arabic: وطن لطيور الماء, romanized: Waṭan li-ṭuyūr al-māʼ, 1975
- Arabic: شجرة العائلة, romanized: Shajar al-ʻāʾilah, 1979
- Arabic: فاكهة الماضي, 1987
- Arabic: أيام آدم, 1993
- Arabic: ممالك ضائعـة, romanized: Mamālik ḍāʾiʻah, 1999
- Arabic: سيد الوحشتين, romanized: Sayyid al-waḥshatayn, 2006
- Arabic: هكذا قلت للريح, romanized: Hākadhā qultu lil-rīḥ, 2008
- Arabic: عشبة الوهــــم: قصائد مختارة, 2010
- Arabic: ذاهـبٌ لاصطياد الندى, romanized: Dhāhib li-iṣṭiyād al-nadá, 2011
- Arabic: نـداء البـدايـات, romanized: Nidāʼ al-bidāyāt, 2013.
- Arabic: حتى يفيض الحصى بالكلام, romanized: Ḥattá yafīḍu al-ḥaṣá bi-al-kalām, lit. 'Till stones begin to talk', 2013
- Arabic: وطن يتهجى المطر, romanized: Waṭan yatahajjá al-maṭar, lit. 'A homeland spelling the rain', 2015
- Arabic: طائرٌ يتعثرُ بالضوء, 2018
- Arabic: فراشات لتبديد الوحشة, 2021

Literary criticism:

- Arabic: قصائد المختارة من شعراء الطليعة العربية, romanized: Qaṣāʾid mukhtārah min shuʻarāʾ al-ṭalīʻah al-ʻArabīyah, 1977
- Arabic: ممكلة الغجر, 1981
- Arabic: دماء القصيدة الحديثة, 1989
- Arabic: في حداثة النص الشعري, romanized: Fī ḥadāthat al-naṣṣ al-shiʻrī, 1990
- Arabic: الشعر والتلقي, romanized: al-Shiʻr wa-al-talaqqī, 1997
- Arabic: قبيلـة من الأنهـار: الذات، الآخـر، النص, 2008
- Arabic: هاهي الغابة فأين الأشجار؟, 2008
- Arabic: من نصّ الأسطورة الى أسطورة النصّ, romanized: Min naṣṣ al-usṭūrah ilá usṭūrat al-naṣṣ, 2010
- Arabic: في مديح النصوص: قراءات نقدية حميمة, romanized: Fī madīḥ al-nuṣūṣ : qirāʼāt naqdīyah ḥamīmīyah, 2013
- Arabic: الدلالة المرئية، قراءات في شعرية القصيدة الحديثة, romanized: al-Dalālah al-marʾīyah : qirāʾāt fī shiʻrīyat al-qaṣīdah al-ḥadīthah, 2013
- Arabic: الحلم والوعي والقصيدة : مقالات في الشعر وما يجاوره, romanized: al-Ḥulm wa-al-waʻy wa-al-qaṣīdah : maqālāt fī al-shiʻr wa-mā yujāwiruh, 2018
- Arabic: المعنى المراوغ : قراءات في شعرية النص, romanized: al-Maʻná al-murāwigh : qirāʼāt fī shiʻrīyat al-naṣṣ, 2020

Collaborative writings:

- Arabic: الشريف الرضي, 1985
- Arabic: أشكال القصيدة العربية, 1988
- Arabic: دراسات عن الشعر العربي, 1995
- Arabic: عالم غالب هلسا, 1996
- Arabic: الشعر العربي في نهاية القرن, 1997

in English

- Poems, 1988
- Tradition and Modernity in Arabic Language and Literature, 1996

Others books:

- Arabic: إلى أين أيتها القصيدة, autobiography, 2022
