= Saadi Youssef =

Iraqi poet (1934–2021)

Saadi Yousef
- سعدي يوسف
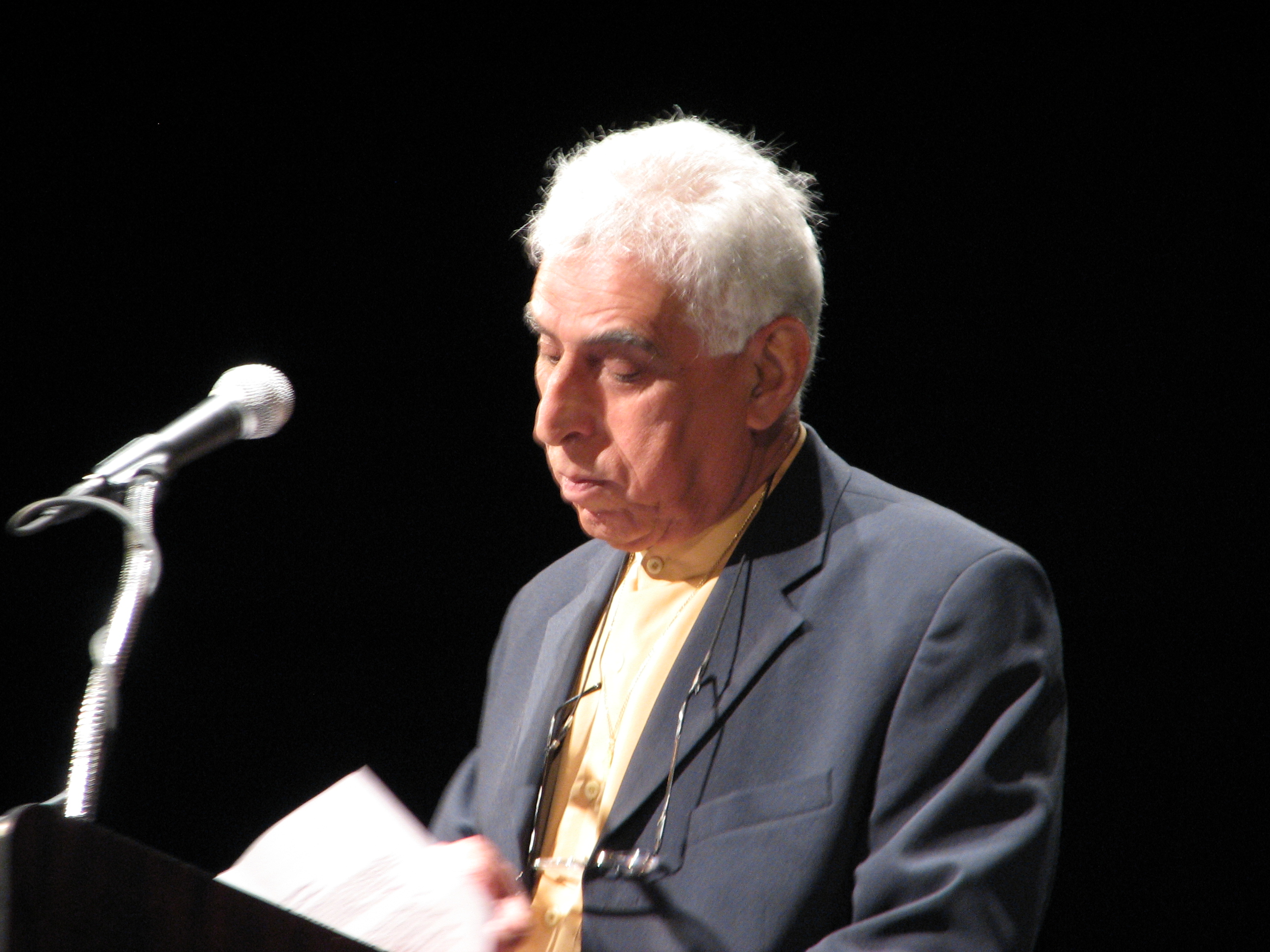
- at PEN World Voices, 2007
- Born: 1934; Abu Al-Khaseeb, Iraq
- Died: 13 June 2021 (aged 86–87); London, England
- Resting place: Highgate Cemetery
- Writing career
- Language: Arabic
- Genre: Poetry
- Notable awards: Al Owais Prize
- Literary movement: Badr Shakir al-Sayyab, Shathel Taqa, Abd al-Wahhab Al-Bayyati
- Website: www.saadiyousif.com/new

Saadi Youssef (Arabic: سعدي يوسف) (1934 – 13 June 2021) was an Iraqi author, poet, journalist, publisher, and political activist. He published thirty volumes of poetry in addition to seven books of prose.

== Life ==
Saadi Youssef studied Arabic literature in Baghdad. He was influenced by the free verse of Shathel Taqa and Abd al-Wahhab Al-Bayyati and was also involved in politics from an early age. At that time, his work was heavily influenced by his socialist and pan-Arab sympathies but has since also taken a more introspective, lyrical turn. He has also translated many well-known writers into Arabic, including Oktay Rifat, Melih Cevdet Anday, Garcia Lorca, Yiannis Ritsos, Walt Whitman and Constantine Cavafy. Following his exile from Iraq, Youssef has lived in many countries, including Algeria, Lebanon, France, Greece, Cyprus, and resided in London until his death.

In 2004, the Al Owais Prize for poetry was given to Youssef. In 2007, Youssef participated in the PEN World Voices festival where he was interviewed by the Wild River Review. In 2014, Youssef's poems were forbidden from being included in the Kurdish school curriculum by the Kurdistan Regional Government over a certain poem in which he referred to Kurdistan as "Qardistan," which loosely translates to "Monkey-istan."

He is buried on the eastern side of Highgate Cemetery.

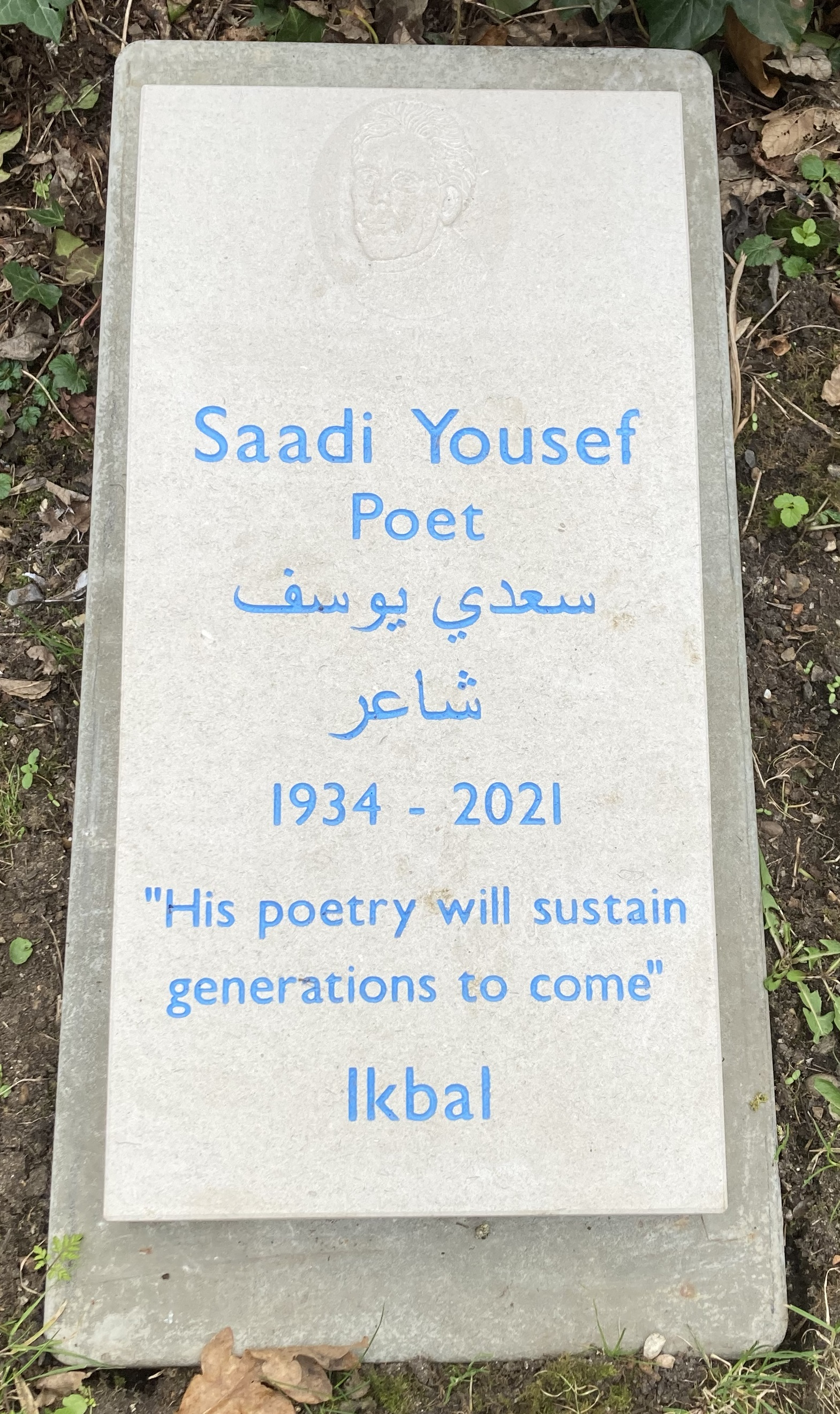
Grave of Saadi Youssef in Highgate Cemetery

== English bibliography ==
Published volumes

- Without an Alphabet, Without a Face: Selected Poems, translated by Khaled Mattawa (Graywolf, 2002). ISBN 1-55597-371-X.
- Nostalgia, My Enemy, translated by Sinan Antoon and Peter Money (Graywolf, 2012). ISBN 978-1-55597-629-3.

In anthology

- Literature from the "Axis of Evil": Writing from Iran, Iraq, North Korea and Other Enemy Nations, edited by Words without Borders (The New Press, 2006). ISBN 978-1-59558-205-8.
- Tablet and Pen, edited by Reza Aslan (Norton, 2010). ISBN 978-0-39306-585-5.
- Ghost Fishing: An Eco-Justice Poetry Anthology, edited by Melissa Tuckey (University of Georgia Press, 2018). ISBN 978-0820353159.

== See also ==
- Iraqi art
- List of Iraqi artists
