= Chawki Bazih =

Lebanese poet

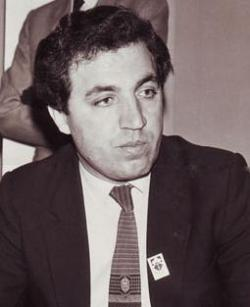
- Born: 1951 (age 74–75); South Lebanon
- Title: Poet and writer

Chawki Bazih (Arabic:شوقي بزيغ) is a Lebanese contemporary poet born in southern Lebanon in 1951. He has dozens of books in poetry and prose, as well as critical, literary, cultural and intellectual articles. He won the Poet of the Year Award in 2010, and the Alowis Cultural Award in 2015. He was awarded the Order of Jumblatt in 2010, the Order of Palestine in 2017, and the Special Honor in the Mahmoud Darwish Award for Culture and Creativity on 13 March 2020.

== Beginnings ==
He was born on 20 January 1951 in Zabaqin. He completed primary school at the free village school of the Charitable Purpose Society and taught English, with primary, middle and secondary education in Tyre. In early 1968, he taught two months at the Alma al-Sha'b Frontier School, then went to the Faculty of Education of the Lebanese University, and obtained a certificate of proficiency in Arabic language and literature in 1973, for a critical study entitled: The Palestinian resistance felt in contemporary Arab criticism, and received the rank of First Honor. In his third year at the Faculty of Education (1970), he was awarded first prize in poetry.

About this period, he says:

"In these five years between 1968 and 1973, Beirut was experiencing its Golden Age, and Lebanon was boiling and blossoming with life, with the will to live and seek a better homeland, far from sectarian, sectarian, feudal, etc., under the roof of Marxism. We were looking for an alternative homeland, and we didn't know going out to the protests in the hundreds of thousands that we were establishing the civil war that was coming. When I came down from the village, I felt like I was exposing myself to dress and damage, just as the tree was being uprooted. "

Adds:

"I loved Beirut so much, I wrote it, and I felt it was a sanctuary after it was a deaf cement castle. But the root of the writing and its fountain for me is the countryside. "

== Works and Cultural activity ==
Chawki was affiliated with the Communist Labor Organization between 1968 and 1972, leaving it for reasons he says are "creative, the result of the Stalinist chauvinistic dimension of some Marxist organizations, and parties. Their model of poetry was Ahmed Fouad Najm and they only saw him. I was influenced by the poets of hadith Badonis, Badr Shakir al – Siab, Khalil Hawi, and Nazar Qabani... And they were shaking at what I was writing, and they just wanted slogans from me. Of course, I was writing slogans during protests like the famous slogan: Oh, freedom. " He taught at Tyre High School until 1982, and at Musaydoua High School in Beirut until 1988, and joined the Ministry of Information in 1988. He worked in the cultural press, headed the cultural section of Ambassador 1992 's newspaper. Prepared various radio programmes in a number of official and private Lebanese radio stations, such as Radio Voice of Arab Lebanon, through which he accompanied the Israeli invasion of Lebanon in 1982 and contributed his poems to the resilience of the Israeli blockade of the Lebanese capital Beirut for almost three months.

He recently announced his position in favour of the 17 December revolution in Lebanon:

"In the Square of Martyrs/where the Lebanese rise to their dignity and, after 19 years of liberation of the land, fight their harshest and most important battle to free man from humiliation and want, to break the unjust circle of the united system of malaise and to write for themselves the most beautiful poem that the poets have been unable to write."

He also produced cultural television programmes on Lebanon's official television. He has contributions to numerous newspapers and magazines, most notably: Ambassador, Al-Na'ar, Lebanese Literature Magazine, Qatari Banner, Al-Dabiyan Federation and Saudi Akkaz.

== Poetries ==
Bazih began publishing his poems in the early 1970s, in "Situations" with the group "Poets of the South." His book "Fast Titles of a Murdered Homeland" was published in 1978, and he opened his first published poems with death:

"I now open my death and enter the season of fire."

He wrote poetry in vernacular and ephemeral, but he was much more proficient in vernacular. His poems have also been characterized by the use of Islamic and Christian heritage with a whiff of mysticism, and have been blended into his poetry, meaning, lyricism, poetry and adoration.

Participated in many poetry festivals in Jarrah, Carthage, Latakia, France, Egypt, etc.

In conversation, he says:

Most of Boakery's poetry has been deleted. I started writing in 1971 when I was a student at the University of Lebanon, and I was writing a poem in both parts by a group of adult critics and poets like Adonis, Yimni Al-Eid and Khalil Hawi, but most of the first writings I deleted from my collection, "First Titles of a Dead Country," and my experience has ranged from the limit of writing about hometown, resistance and homeland to writing about women."

He explains that his poem was "fed from a place related to major issues. But I suddenly felt like I was at a crossroads, and I was silent for five whole years between 1985 and 1990, and when I went back to writing I wrote a poem that was detailed to me, "Dust Hereditary," which was later published together with other poems in an independent Diwan and was later awarded a Crutch Prize for Arabic poetry. "

Some of his other collections have also formed basic stops in his poetry, such as: Yusuf Shirts and Mirab Al Muthani.

Several studies, research and academic works have been written in his poetry, and his poetry has been misplaced, and poems have been translated into several languages, including: English, French, German, Persian. Some of his poems also turned into songs.

== Poets of the South ==
Chawki Bazih says about the experience of the "Poets of the South":

"The poet has only a script. He's the one who stays and he's the one who's gonna face time later. The experience of friendly poet Habib Sadiq has contributed to the nickname "Poets of the South" through the "Cultural Council of Southern Lebanon," launching the "Festival of Southern Poetry" since the early 1970s in some southern cities such as Nabatiyah and Tyre, and sometimes in Beirut. That may have contributed to the nomenclature crystallization, but it didn't last long. What's left in the end is the poet, so now you see that every Southern poet distinguishes, singles and takes an independent line. "

== Darwish Prize ==
Chawki Bazih has won numerous awards. including, most recently, the late Palestinian Poet Mahmoud Darwish Foundation's "Special Honor Award," and in detail. The Foundation awarded its 2020 Prize for Culture and Creativity to American Thinker Noam Chomsky, Moroccan poet and translator Abdullatif Al-Tabi, and Palestinian poet and scholar Zachariah Mohamed. The executive board of the Foundation awarded the Special Honor Award to Lebanese poet Chawki Bazih.The award is awarded on the anniversary of Darwish's birth on 13 March, National Culture Day.

The Arbitration Commission's statement stated that it had awarded the Lebanese Poet Chawki Bazih Special Honor Award," whose experience offers a unique and profound creative model, in which the solid lyric structure based on a pure rhythmic structure, the modernist structure of the image and the open-ended martyrdom of the present, the courageous bias of his people in Lebanon and their aspirations.

In turn, he commented on his Facebook account on the award:

"The Mahmoud Darwish Prize for Culture and Creativity (Special Rank of Honour) is the most prestigious necklace in which Palestine has decorated my chest, burdened with poison loads and torments."

== It's said ==
The critic Zahida Darwish Jabbour wrote in the first volume of Chawki Bazih poetic work:

"If we wanted to describe chawki Bazih creative experience in one word, we wouldn't find it better than the river, it's ever-regenerating and its water is one that doesn't change."

== Literature ==
He published his complete poetry in two parts on the Arab Foundation for Studies and Publication in Beirut in 2005.

1. Quick headlines for a murdered homeland 1978.
2. Departure to Sunbathing 1981.
3. Love songs on the Litani River 1985.
4. Remorse 1990.
5. Dust Hereditary 1992.
6. I was a stranger among women 1994.
7. Yusuf shirts 1996.
8. Early appetites 1998.
9. Fredis the Beast 1999.
10. Baroque Mountain 2002.
11. Mirab al-Muthanna 2003.
12. Remorse 2005.
13. The Kingdom of Solitude 2006.
14. Screaming Trees 2007.
15. None of this 2007.
16. It's all my fault I tried 2007.
17. Butterflies for the Buddha smile 2013.
18. Where are you taking me, poetry 2015.

== Prose Books ==
- Rear doors 2005.
- Word Migration 2008.
- Beirut in Poets 2010.
