= Abdel Khaliq al-Rikabi =

Iraqi author

Abdel Khaliq al-Rikabi is an Iraqi author. He is one of the few major Iraqi authors to have resisted emigration. He is best known for his novel Seventh Day of Creation.
