= Mohammad Ibrahim Abu Senna =

Egyptian poet (1937–2024)

Mohammad Ibrahim Abu Senna (Arabic: محمد إبراهيم أبو سنّة; 1937 – 10 November 2024) was an Egyptian poet in the 1960s. His writings are known for their smoothness, and his love poems are considered unique.

Abu Senna was an Al-Azhar University, Faculty of Arabic Studies graduate in 1964. For ten years (1965–1975) he worked as a political editor with the State Information Service, a radio host in 1976 as well as a director-general of the Cultural Program in 1995.

Abu Senna died on 10 November 2024, at the age of 87.
