= Shathel Taqa =

71st Iraqi Minister of Foreign Affairs

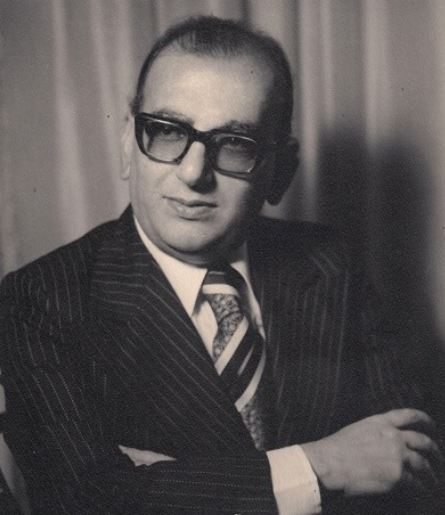

Shathel Taqa, (in Arabic:شاذل طاقة 28 April 1929 – 20 October 1974), or Shadhil Taqa, is an Iraqi poet, diplomat, and politician. He is one of the founders, together with Badr Shakir al-Sayyab, Nazik al-Malaika and others, of the free verse movement in modern Arabic poetry, which emerged in Iraq in the late 1940s and early 1950s.

== Early years ==
Taqa was born in the Iraqi city of Mosul, Nineveh, where he completed his school studies. In 1947, he pursued his studies in Baghdad to major in Arabic literature. In 1950 he graduated from the Higher Teachers College (later on called college of education) Baghdad University. While working as a high school teacher after graduation, he actively wrote articles in the local press, most of which were political that caused him troubles with the authorities. Taqa started composing poems early while he was just a high school student. His poems used to appear in the local press of Mosul in late 1940s.

== Political career ==
- In 1958, Taqa was transferred to the Ministry of Culture as advisor.
- In 1962, he joined the American University in Beirut to proceed with his higher education. Within one year he was recalled to take up the post of Director General of Iraqi News Agency. Because of his liberal and pan-Arab thinking, he was jailed more than once.
- In 1968, he was appointed under-secretary of the Ministry of Information, and one year later transferred as Ambassador of Iraq to the Soviet Union for the years 1969–1971.
- In 1972, he was appointed under-secretary of the Ministry of Foreign Affairs.
- In 1974, when Iraq was under the rule of President Ahmed Hassan al-Bakr, Taqa was appointed Minister of the Iraqi Foreign Affairs. In the same year he died at the age of 45, in Rabat (Morocco), where he was attending a Summit of Arab Foreign Ministers.

== Literary works ==
- In 1950, at the age of 21, he issued his first collection of poems "The Last evening" ( المساء الأخير)
- In 1956, he shared his second collection "Poems Banned from publication" ( قصائد غير صالحة للنشر) with three Iraqi prominent poets.
- Later, he issued two more collections: "…Then Died the Night" (ثم مات الليل) and "One-eyed Antichrist & the Strangers" (الأعور الدجال والغرباء) 1963 and 1969 respectively.

== Other works ==
- History of the Abbasid Literature, ( تاريخ الأدب العباسي) 1953, a study of poetry within the First Abbasid Era, soon adopted as a curriculum for high school.
- About Media &the Battle, (في الإعلام والمعركة) 1969, published by the Iraqi Ministry of Information

== About his poetry ==
Iraqi and Arab scholars, who studied his poetry, noticed that the volume of his poetical works was relatively limited to a certain extent. This explains why his poetry maintained certain standards that prevented him from being redundant. Therefore, his poems are characterized by diversity. His poems are known to be close to one’s heart simply because of the spontaneous language along with its beautiful rhythm. In his poems, one can easily detect the historic events that reflect a realistic image of livelihood. Readers can also feel the rich heritage of different sources expressed in sincere and deep emotional way.

Concerning modern Arabic poetry, Taqa said in his introduction to his first collection of poems "The Last Evening" in 1950 that: “this sort of poetry modern poetry is not a free verse neither it is free of all restraints, but it commits itself by certain limits. It should be noted, however, for the sake of art, that this type of poetry is not innovative for its origins that are deeply rooted in the Andalusian poetry..”. On the poet's role in life, he also said: “poetry at this age, maintains its serious role. The poet, has been, as he was for ages, a prophet amongst people to guide them and rectify their distorted tastes; That is enough for the poet because he does not have to be a mouthpiece for social reform who aims at serving the country directly. If so, there would be no real poetry, and we would not have the right to describe poetry as a fine art”.
