= Ahmed Etman =

Egyptian professor of classics (1945–2013)

Ahmed Etman (Arabic: أحمد عتمان; 1945 – August 15, 2013) was an Egyptian academic and translator. He obtained his bachelor's degree in Arts from the Department of Greek and Latin Studies at the Faculty of Arts, Cairo University. He translated numerous Greek books, and in recognition of his efforts, the Greek government honored him and chose him as an Ambassador for Greek Civilization. He founded and presided over the Egyptian Society for Greek and Roman Studies and became its official representative to the International Federation of Societies.

== Life ==
Ahmed Etman was born in the town of Beni Etman, Beni Suef, Egypt. He attended El Nil Secondary School in his hometown, where he ranked tenth nationally in the Egyptian Republic in 1961. He earned his bachelor's degree in Classics from Cairo University at the age of twenty, and later obtained his Ph.D. from the University of Athens in 1974.

His academic career at Cairo University began in 1965 as an assistant lecturer. He went on to become a professor at the same college in 1986 and served as the head of his department from 1989-1994 and again from 1997-2000. He was also a professor of Comparative Literature, the head of the Egyptian Society of Comparative Literature, and an honorary member of the Literary society in Greece (Parnassos). From 1989 to 1992, he served as an advisor to the Minister of Education on matters concerning the Library of Alexandria.

== Works ==
Over six years, Etman, along with collaborators, translated Homer's epic poem the Iliad, marking the first time the work was translated directly into Arabic from the original Greek text. He also translated other major Greek works by authors like Sophocles and Euripides.

Beyond Greek literature, he contributed to the translation of the meanings of the Quran and translated several Arabic literary works into Greek, including Naguib Mahfouz's novel Bidaya wa Nihaya (Beginning and End).

Etman's research and writings challenged many conventional literary concepts, exploring the relationship between literature and history. Notable works include his book on Latin literature's civilizational role and his study on the character of Cleopatra as portrayed by Plutarch, Shakespeare, and Ahmed Shawqi. A great lover of theater, he also participated in translating Virgil's Aeneid and Aristophanes' play The Clouds. Among his most prominent works is The Mask of Brecht and Communism: A Study in Epic Theater.

== Awards and honors ==
- State Incentive Award for Translation (1973) for his translation of Virgil's epic poem, the Aeneid, into Arabic from Latin (in collaboration with others).
- Cavafy International Prize (1991) for his translation of Naguib Mahfouz's novel Bidaya wa Nihaya (Beginning and End) into modern Greek.
- Best Translated Book Award (1998) for Black Athena.
- Supreme Council of Culture Shield (2004) for his translation of Homer's Iliad.
- Naguib Mahfouz Award for Literary Creativity at the university's appreciation awards (2005).
- Cairo University Award for Excellence in Humanities (2010).
- Certificate of Appreciation and selection as an Ambassador of Hellenism (2010).

In February 2013, he was honored by Classical Papers as the "undisputed pioneer of classics in the Arab world."
