= Yumna Al-Eid =

Lebanese writer and literary critic

- Born: 1935 (age 90–91); Sidon, Lebanon
- Education: Lebanese University; Sorbonne Université
- Occupations: Writer & literary critic
- Political party: Lebanese Communist Party
- Spouse: Nazih El-Khatib

Yumna Al-Eid (Arabic: يُمنى العيد) (born 1935) is a Lebanese writer and literary critic. She is considered a professor in Arabic criticism in more than one university in both the Orient and the Occident. Her original name, according to her identity, is Hikmat Al-Majthoob Al-Sabbagh, and she is also known as Hikmat Al-Khatib. She has tens of publications in both literature and criticism. She received many Arabic honorary certificates and awards, amongst which is Al-Owais Award. She was also chosen as the Cultural Personality of the Year in Sharjah International Book Fair.

== Early life ==
Yumna Al-Eid was born in Sidon (south of Lebanon) in 1935. She received her MA from Lebanese University and her PhD in literature from Sorbonne Université in 1977. She then dedicated herself to higher education in the college of Arts and Humanities Sciences in Lebanese University until her resignation in 1999. She was also a visiting professor in Sorbonne Université in Paris, Sana’a university in Yemen, and Applied Research and Feminist Studies Centre in Sana’a.

== Cultural activity ==
Yumna participated in several symposiums and conferences. In the early days of her cultural and intellectual life, she became a member of the Lebanese Communist Party. She dissociated herself from the political environment in 1988. She is also a member in Arab Writers Union, Cultural Council for South Lebanon, Cultural Center for Research and Documentation in Sidon, Writer and Book Association in Beirut, Mahdi Amel Cultural Centre, and in an editorial board in a literary non-Arabic magazine. She was also a head of several arbitration committees, the last of which was the International Prize for Arabic Fiction. In addition, she was a member of the consultative body for the project ‘A Book in a Newspaper’.

Yumna Al-Eid received Al-Owais Award for literary criticism in 1993. The committee announced the decision of her winning as follows:

The oeuvre of Dr. Yumna Al-Eid in its entirety reveals an excellent consciousness over the novel methods of criticism and a clear scrupulous care that the theory and the Arabic text are in accordance and the term used for that is adhered to economically. These characteristics, therefore, allow her criticism to include many personal observations and attention to the integrated elements of the literary text, in addition to the frugal symbols which present the theoretical fundamentals to the Arab reader. With this method which combines both the theory and conscious criticism, and pays attention to many creative texts in the Arab World, Dr. Yumna achieves an exemplary distinction in the field of criticism.

Sharjah Book Authority chose Yumna Al-Eid as the Cultural Personality of the Year at the 38th edition of Sharjah International Book Fair, which was held under the slogan ‘Open Books. Open Minds,’ to celebrate the choosing of the emirate of Sharjah the World Book Capital. Yumna of the ‘open text’ was chosen in appreciation for her cognitive efforts which extend over four decades of writing and composition in Arabic literary texts, for she submitted tens of studies and specialized research in literary criticism, comparative criticism, literary documentation, historical approaches and other writings. On choosing Yumna Al-Eid, Ahmed Al-Ameri, Chairman of Sharjah Book Authority (SBA), said:

Dr. Yumna Al-Eid is a literary pillar which -for over forty years- has enriched the Arabic library with literary and critical works, and succeeded through her epistemic undertaking to be one of the active influentials in studying Arabic literature. Therefore, through guesting her to the fair as the cultural personality of the year, we renew our commitment and obligation to the Arab intellectuals and those which represent Arabic literature, and we confer honour upon them and pay them tribute for all what they extended and continue to extend for the Arabic civilization.

== Works ==
Yumna Al-Eid published in several Arabic magazines, some of which are: Mawaqif, AlKarmel, Kalimat, Adab wa Naqd, Shu’oon Adabia, Qadhaya wa Shahadat, Al-Adab, and Al-Tarik. In addition, she started publishing literary articles and books in the 60s, some of which are:

- Ameen Rihani: Arabs’ Wanderer (original title: Rahalat Al-Arab) – 1970
- Qasim Amin: Amending Woman Tutelage (original title: Islah Qawamat Al-Mar’a) – 1970
- Practices in Literary Criticism (Original title: Mumarasat fi Al-Naqd Al-Adabi) – 1975
- Social Significance of Romantic Literature Movement in Lebanon (original title: Al-Dalala Al-Idgtima’ia li Harakat Al-Adab Al-Romantiki fi Lubnan) – 1979 and 1989
- Issues on Culture and Democracy (original title: Qadhaia fi Al-Thaqafa wa Al-Dimuqratiya) – 1980
- In Knowing the Text (original title: Fi ma’rifat Al-Nas) – 1983
- The Narrator: Locale and Style (original title: Al-Rawi: Al-Mawqi’ wa Al-Shakl) – 1986
- In Poetic Speech (original title: Fi Al-Qawl Al-Shi’ri) – 1987–2008
- Narration Techniques in Light of Structural Approach (original title: Tiqniat Al-Sard Al-Riwa’i fi Dhaw’ Al-Manhadj Al-Bunyawi) – 1990
- Writing is Transformation within the Transformation: An Approach to Literary Writing in the Time of Lebanese Civil War (original title: Al-Kitaba Tahawul fi Al-Tahawul: Muqaraba Lilkitaba Al-Adabia fi Zaman Al-Harb Al-Lubnania) – 1993
- The Arabic Novel Art: Between Particularity of the Tale and Distinction of the Discourse (original title: Fan Al-Riwaya Al-Arabiya: Bain Khususiyat Al-Hikaya wa Tamayuz Al-Khitab) – 1998
- In Zionist Hypocrisy: A Reading in Scene and Discourse (original title: Fi Al-Nifaq Al-Israeli: Qira’a fi Al-Mash’had wa Al-Khitab) – 2003
- In Concepts of Criticism and Arabic Cultural Movement (original title: Fi Mafaheem Al-Naqd wa Harakat Al-Thaqafa Al-Arabiya) - 2005
- Insomnia of the Soul (original title: Araq Al-Rooh) – 2013
- Time of the Labyrinth (original title: Zaman Al-Mataha) – 2015
- In the History of Criticism and the Question of the Arabic Culture (original title: Fi Tariekh Al-Naqd wa Su’al Al-Thaqafa Al-Arabiya) – 2017

== Her translations ==
Marxism and the Philosophy of Language by Mikhail Bachtin, co-translated with Muhammed Al-Bakri, Les Edition Toubkal, Morocco, 1983.

== Works translated into French ==
Yumná al-ʻĪd, Hors les voiles, trad. par Leila Khatib Touma (Paris: L’Harmattan, 2016).

== Awards ==
- Al Owais Cultural Foundation Award in the Literary Studies and Criticism category in 1992–1993.
