= Kamal Abu-Deeb =

Chair of Arabic at the University of London

Kamal Abu-Deeb in Arabic (كمال أبو ديب) (born 1942 in Safita, Syria) is Chair of Arabic at the University of London. He was a Leverhulme Trust Fellow.

== Life ==
He graduated from Damascus University, Trinity College, Oxford, and St John's College, Oxford.

He edited the journal Mawakif with poet Adunis.

Prof. Hisham Sharabi described him as "a leading Syrian structuralist critic."

== Works ==
- Issa J. Boullata; Kamal Abdel-Malek; Wael B. Hallaq, eds. (2000). "The Collapse of Totalizing Discourse and the Rise of Marginalized/Minority Discourses". Tradition, Modernity, and Postmodernity in Arabic Literature: Essays in Honor of Professor Issa J. Boullata. BRILL. pp. 335–. ISBN 90-04-11763-6.
- Adhabat al-Mutanabbi fi Suhbat Kamal Abu-Deeb wa al-'Aks bi al-'Aks, Al-Saqi Books, London & Beirut, 1996
