= Abd al-Wahhab Al-Bayati =

Iraqi poet (1926–1999)

Abdul-Wahab Al-Bayati عبد الوهاب البياتي
- Al-Bayati, 1999
- Born: December 19, 1926; Baghdad, Iraq
- Died: August 3, 1999 (aged 72); Damascus, Syria
- Occupation: Poet

Abd al-Wahhab al-Bayati (Arabic: عبد الوهاب البياتي) (December 19, 1926 – August 3, 1999) was an Iraqi poet.

== Biography ==
Al-Bayati was born in Baghdad. One of his friends, Ahmed Abdel-Moeti Hegazi, said urban centers of "hotels and institutions, cafés and airports" were actually his temporary residences. He attended Baghdad University, and became a teacher after graduating from Dar al-Mu'allimin (the Teacher's College) in 1950, the same year that he released his first collection of poems, Mala'ika wa Shayatin (Angels and Devils).

In 1996, he published a poem "The Dragon". The translation by Farouk Abdel Wahab, Najat Rahman, and Carolina Hotchandani is from the volume Iraqi Poetry Today (ISBN 0-9533824-6-X) (c) 2003, edited by Saadi Simawe. "The Dragon" is an example of al-Bayyati's frequent incorporation of mythological figures into his poetry. Critics have interpreted the poem as addressed to Saddam Hussein.

=== Sufism ===
Al-Bayati was influenced by the Middle Eastern Sufi figures. One example is a poem by al-Bayati entitled "A’isha's Mad Lover" in his book, Love Poems on the Seven Gates of the World (1971): "In this context Al-Bayati's poetry becomes Sufi in default, since he assumes the position as a modernist whose aspirations for an earthy paradise have not materialized."

== Works ==
=== Original volumes ===
- Mala'ika wa shayatin (Angels and Devils), 1950
- Abariq muhashshama, 1954
- Risala ila Hazim Hikmet wa quas'aid ukhra, 1956
- Al-Majd li al-atfal wa al-zaytun, 1956
- Ash'ar fi al-manfa, 1957
- Ishrun qasida min Berlin, 1959
- Kalimat la tamut, 1960
- Muhakama fi Nisabur, 1963
- Al-Nar wa al-kalimat, 1964
- Sifr al-faqr wa al-thawra, 1965
- Alladhi ya'ti wa laya'ti, 1966
- Al Mawt fi al Hayat, 1968
- Tajribati al-shi'riyya, 1968
- 'Ulyun al-kilab al-mayyita, 1969
- Buka'iyya ila shams haziran wa al-murtaziqa, 1969
- Al Kitaba al Teen, 1970
- Yawmiyyat siyasi muhtarif, 1970
- Qasaid hubb 'ala bawwabat al-'alam al-sab, 1971
- Sira dhatiyya li sariq al-nar, 1974
- Kitab al-bahr, 1974
- Qamar Shiraz, 1976
- Mamlakat al-sunbula, 1979
- Sawt al-sanawat al-daw'iyya, 1979
- Bustan 'A'isha, 1989
- Al-Bahr Ba'id, Asma'uh Yatanahhud (The Sea is Distant, I Hear It Sighing), 1998

=== Translated volumes ===
- Lilies and Death, 1972 (trans. Mohammed B. Alwan)
- The Singer and the Moon, 1976 (trans. Abdullah al-Udhari)
- Eye of the Sun, 1978
- Love Under Rain (Al-hubb tahta al-matar), 1985 (transl. Desmond Stewart and George Masri)
- Love, Death, and Exile, 1990 (trans. Bassam K. Frangieh)

=== Anthologies with only works by Abd al-Wahhab Al-Bayati ===
- Poet of Iraq: Abdul Wahab al-Bayati. An introductory essay with translations by Desmond Stewart, 1976
- Abdul Wahab al-Bayati, 1979 (a short introduction and four poems, trans. Desmond Stewart and George Masri)

=== Anthologies with works by Abd al-Wahhab Al-Bayati and other poets ===
- Abdullah al-Udhari, ed. and trans. Modern Poetry of the Arab World. Harmondsworth, UK: Penguin, 1986.
  - An Apology for a Short Speech
  - The Arab Refugee
  - The Fugitive
  - Hamlet
  - Profile of the Lover of the Great Bear
  - To Ernest Hemingway
- Salma Khadra Jayyusi, ed. Modern Arabic Poetry: An Anthology. New York: Columbia University Press, 1987
  - The Birth of Aisha and Her Death
  - Eligy for Aisha
  - The Impossible
  - Luzumiyya
- Simawe, Saadi ed. Iraqi Poetry Today, ISBN 0-9533824-6-X London: King's College, London, 2003
  - The Dragon
  - An Elegy to Aisha
  - I am Born and I Burn in My Love
  - Love Under The Rain
  - The Nightmare
  - Nine Ruba'iyat
  - Shiraz Moon
  - Three Ruba'iyat
  - To Naguib Mahfouz [Amman, 15 April 1997]
  - To TS Eliot
  - Transformations of Aisha: Aisha's Birth and Death in the Magical Rituals Inscribed in Cuneiform on the Nineveh Tablets
  - Two Poems for my son, Ali
  - Who Owns the Homeland?
- Writing on Aisha's Tomb
