= Bahraini literature =

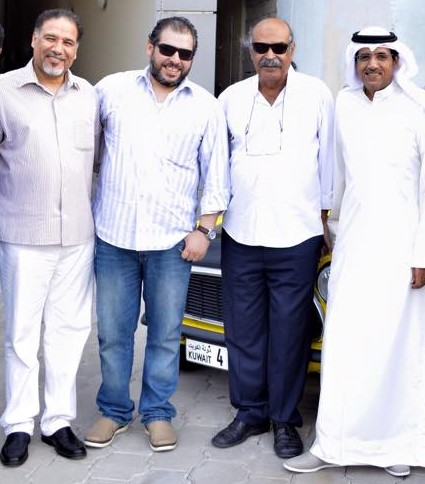
From the right: the poet Eid Al-Duwaikh, the poet Qasim Haddad, the poet Saad Al-Yasri, and the poet Dakhil Al-Khalifa

Bahrain has a strong literary tradition. Most traditional writers and poets write in the classical Arabic style, contemporary poets that write in this style include Ali al-Sharqawi, Qassim Haddad, Ebrahim Al-Arrayedh, and Ahmad Muhammed Al Khalifa. In recent years, the number of younger poets influenced by western literature are rising, most writing in free verse or prose poetry, and often including political or personal content. Almost all publications of poetry in the country are in Arabic, with poetry rarely published in English without requiring prior translation. Ali al-Sharqawi, a decorated longtime poet, is considered by many to be the literary icon of Bahrain. The country's local writing society, the Bahrain Writers Association, was founded in 1969.

== History ==
In August 2004, the supernatural thriller book QuixotiQ, by former Bahraini journalist Ali Al-Saeed, was published, marking the first time ever a Bahraini author has published a novel directly in English without requiring a translation. In February 2011, Bahraini writers, artists and intellectuals signed a statement declaring their solidarity with the Egyptian revolutionary movement.

=== Female writers ===
Bahrain Writers Association headquarters.

Poetry was the principal form of literature Bahraini women engaged in during the 20th century. In fact, it was estimated that one-sixth of all Bahraini poets between 1925 and 1985 were women. Prominent female writers at the time included the likes of Iman Asiri, Fatima al-Taytun, Fathiya 'Ajlan, Hamda Khamis and Fawziyya al-Sindi.

In the second half of the 20th century, prose as well as free verse poetry gained popularity in the country, especially amongst women. However, it was only until 1969 did women finally emerge on the free verse and prose scene, with the publication of Shazaya (Arabic: شظايا, meaning "shrapnel") by Hamda Khamis, which was coincidentally Khamis' first experience in poetry. Iman Asiri was the first recorded poet to write and publish a prose poem in the country in the late 1960s.

== Bahrain in literature ==
Bahrain was the site of the ancient land of Dilmun, which was mentioned in ancient text, Epic of Gilgamesh. Legend also states that it was the location of the Garden of Eden. Bahrain has a setting in James Joyce's Finnegans Wake. Lucy Caldwell's award-winning novel, The Meeting Point, is also set in Bahrain.

== Writers ==
- Ali Abdullah Khalifa – a founding member of the Union of Bahraini Writers and has released 3 collections of poetry.
- Ali Al Jallawi – political poet and writer.
- Ali al-Saeed – author of 3 national best-selling, critically acclaimed books and the recipient of the Bahraini Outstanding Book of the Year Award.
- Ali Al Shargawi – veteran poet and author, with his poetry translated into several languages.
- Ahmad Muhammed Al Khalifa – born in 1930, he has written poetry about nationalism and romance, with a total of five collections of poetry published.
- Attiya al-Jamri - Famous for his religious poetry about Imam Hussain during Muharram.
- Ebrahim Al-Arrayedh – Dubbed as one of Bahrain's greatest poets, with his poetry being popular throughout the Arab world.
- Ebrahim bin Mohammed Al Khalifa – born in the middle of the 19th century, he was a well-known poet in early 20th century Bahrain and was commended by Charles Belgrave during his tenure in the country. His majlis in Muharraq is currently used as a centre for culture and research.
- Hamda Khamis - Widely recognised as the first female Bahraini poet, having published her first collection in 1969.
- Qassim Haddad – he is the head of the Union of Bahraini Writers and one of the most famous poets of Bahrain. He rose to prominence for his revolutionary poetry.
- M.G. Darwish - An award nominated novelist who writes fantasy pulp novels and series.

== See also ==
- Bahrain Writers Association
- Bahraini art
- Theatre of Bahrain
- Cinema of Bahrain
- Culture of Bahrain
