= 1948 in poetry =

Nationality words link to articles with information on the nation's poetry or literature (for instance, Irish or France).

== Events ==
- January 6 – Pablo Neruda speaks out in the Senate of Chile against political repression and is forced into hiding.
- Summer – Composer Richard Strauss sets three short poems by Hermann Hesse to music; they become part of his valedictory Four Last Songs, his final works before his death in 1949.
- September 17 – The remains of Irish poet W. B. Yeats (who died at Menton, France in 1939) are re-buried at Drumcliffe, County Sligo, "Under bare Ben Bulben's head", having been moved from the original burial place, Roquebrune-Cap-Martin, on Irish Naval Service corvette LÉ Macha. His grave at Drumcliffe, with an epitaph from "Under Ben Bulben", one of his final poems ("Cast a cold Eye / On Life, on Death. / Horseman, pass by"), becomes a place of literary pilgrimage
- Sometime this year, Jack Kerouac introduces the phrase Beat Generation to describe his friends and as a general term describing the underground, anti-conformist youth gathering in New York at this time to the novelist John Clellon Holmes
- Di Goldene Keyt, an Israeli literary quarterly, is founded
- The Bollingen Prize is established by Paul Mellon, funded by a $10,000 grant from the Bollingen Foundation to the Library of Congress.

== Works published in English ==
Listed by nation where the work was first published and again by the poet's native land, if different; substantially revised works listed separately:

=== Canada ===
- Earle Birney, The Strait of Anian. Toronto: Ryerson Press.
- Roy Daniels, Deeper into the Forest
- Robert Finch, The Strength of the Hills
- A. M. Klein, The Rocking Chair and Other Poems. Governor General's Award 1948.
- Irving Layton, Now Is The Place: Stories and Poems. Montreal: First Statement Press.
- Douglas Le Pan, The Wounded Prince
- L. A. MacKay, The Ill-Tempered Lover
- A. J. M. Smith, editor, The Book of Canadian Poetry, anthology (see also editions of 1943, 1957)
- Arthur Stringer, New York Nocturnes. Toronto: Ryerson.

=== India, in English ===
- Bimal Chandra Bose, Gandhi-Gita ( Poetry in English ), Calcutta: Thacker, Spink and Co.
- Gurdial Mallik, Hound of the Heart ( Poetry in English ), Bombay: Naranda Publications
- Dilip Kumar Roy, Eyes of Light ( Poetry in English ), Bombay: Nalanda Publications
- Nanikram Vasanmal Thadani, He Walked Alone ( Poetry in English ), Delhi: Bharat Publishing House

=== United Kingdom ===
- Richard Aldington, Complete Poems
- Edward Andrade, He Likens Her to a Soldier
- John Betjeman, Selected Poems
- Lilian Bowes Lyon, Collected Poems
- Lawrence Durrell, On Seeming to Presume
- T. S. Eliot, Notes Towards the Definition of Culture
- D. J. Enright, Season Ticket
- Robert Farren, The Course of Irish Verse in English, Irish criticism
- W. S. Graham, The Voyages of Alfred Wallis
- Robert Graves, The White Goddess, a "historical grammar" of poetic myth and inspiration
- Jacquetta Hawkes, Symbols and Speculations
- John Heath-Stubbs, The Swarming of the Bees
- Hamish Henderson, Elegies for the Dead in Cyrenaica
- A. Norman Jeffares, W. B. Yeats: Man And Poet, United Kingdom, biography, revised in 1978
- Louis MacNeice, Holes in the Sky
- Norman Nicholson, Rock Face
- Vernon Scannell, Graves and Resurrections
- Sydney Goodsir Smith, Under the Eildon Tree: a poem in XXIV elegies
- Vernon Watkins, The Lady with the Unicorn

=== United States ===
- W. H. Auden, "In Praise of Limestone", a poem published in Horizon in July (written in May), later published in a collection in 1951 (native English poet living in the United States)
- John Berryman, The Dispossessed
- Richard Ellmann, Yeats, The Man And The Mask, United States, biography
- William Everson, The Residual Years, New Directions
- Langston Hughes, One-Way Ticket, Alfred A. Knopf
- Randall Jarrell, Losses
- Robinson Jeffers, The Double Axe and Other Poems, largely critical of U.S. policy, the book came with an extremely unconventional note from Random House that the views expressed by Jeffers were not those of the publisher; several influential literary critics disapproved of the book, with particularly scathing pieces penned by Yvor Winters and Kenneth Rexroth, who had previously commented favorably on Jeffers' work
- Archibald MacLeish, Actfive and Other Poems
- William Meredith, Ships and Other Figures
- Ezra Pound:
  - The Pisan Cantos
  - The Cantos of Ezra Pound
- Theodore Roethke, The Lost Son and Other Poems
- Muriel Rukeyser, The Green Wave
- May Sarton, The Lion and the Rose
- Wallace Stevens, A Primitive Like an Orb, Publisher: Gotham Book Mart
- Winfield Townley Scott, Mr. Whittier
- Mark Van Doren, New Poems
- Peter Viereck, Terror and Decorum
- William Carlos Williams:
  - Paterson, Book II
  - Clouds, Aigeltinger, Russia

=== Other in English ===
- James K. Baxter, Blow, Wind of Fruitfulness, New Zealand
- V. N. Bhusan, The Far Ascent, Bombay: Padma Pub.; India, Indian poetry in English
- Charles Brasch: Disputed Ground: Poems 1939-45, Christchurch: Caxton Press, New Zealand
- Robert Farren, The Course of Irish Verse in English, Irish criticism published in the United Kingdom
- Derek Walcott, 25 Poems

== Works published in other languages ==
Listed by nation where the work was first published and again by the poet's native land, if different; substantially revised works listed separately:

=== France ===
- Louis Aragon, Le Nouveau Creve-Coeur
- André Breton, Poemes
- Aimé Césaire, Soleil cou coupé; Paris: K
- René Char, Fureur et mystere
- Paul Éluard, Corps mémorable
- Henri Michaux, La Vie dans les plis ("Life in the Folds")
- Saint-John Perse, Anabase, revised edition (first edition 1924)
- Jacques Prévert, Histoires
- Francis Ponge, Proêmes
- Raymond Queneau:
  - L'Instant fatal
  - Saint-Glinglin
- Georges Schéhadé, Hosties noires

=== India ===
In each section, listed in alphabetical order by first name:

==== Bengali ====
- Sukanta Bhattacharya, Chharpatra, posthumous
- Jibanananda Das, Satti Tarar Timur
- Mangalacharan Chattopadhyay, Telangana-O-Anyanya Kabita
- Premendra Mitra, Pherari Phauj
- Subhas Mukhopadhyay, Agnikon

==== Kannada ====
- Gangadhara Chittala, Kalada Kare, lyrics on the theme of "time"
- M. Gopalakrishna Adiga, Kattuvevu, his first collection of lyrics
- S. G. Kulakarni, editor, Kannada kavya Bhandara, anthology of navodaya poets, including B. M. Shreekantayya, K. V. Puttappa, D. R. Bendre and D. V. Gundappa

==== Other languages on the Indian subcontinent ====
- Amrita Pritan, Lamian Vatan, Punjabi language
- Ananta Patnaik, Tarpana Kare Aji, poems on Gandhi, Oriya
- Asi, pen name of Abdul Bari, Rubaiyati Asi, Urdu
- Buddhidhari Singha, Amar Bapu, Maithili
- Harivans Rai Bacchan, Sut Ki Mala, 111 eleven poems on Gandhi and his ideology, Hindi
- Khumanthem Ibohal Singh, Nacome Lei ("Bouquet"), Manipuri
- Maheswar Neog, Sri Sri Sankaradeva, Assamese
- Mahjoor, Vava Subahuki, a political poem on the indignation of Kashmiris at delays in the United Nations Security Council concerning pleas to counter Pakistan's actions regarding that area; Kashmiri
- N. V. Krishna Varier, Ninta Kavitakal, long poems in Malayalam
- Nayaya vijaya Muni, Visva Vibhuti Svargaroha, a poem on Gandhi's death, Sanskrit
- Sumitranandan Pant, Visva Vibhuti Svargaroha, Hindi-language poems written in homage to Gandhi, Rabindranath Tagore and Sri Aurobindo
- Upendranath Jha, Sannyasi, a Kanda Kavya in blank verse, Maithili

=== Other languages ===
- García Baena, Mientras cantan los pájaros ("While Birds Sing"), Spain
- Aimé Césaire, Soleil cou coupé, Martinique author published in France
- Peter Huchel, Gedichte (Poems), East Germany
- Bohumil Hrabal, Ztracená ulička ("A Lost Alley"), Czechoslovakia
- Henryk Jasiczek, Rozmowy z ciszą ("Conversations with Silence"), Poland
- Olga Kirsch, Mure van die Hart, Afrikaans, South Africa
- Paul la Cour, Fragmenter af en Dagbog ("Fragments of a Diary"), Denmark
- Alexander Mezhirov, Kommunisty, vpered!, "Communists, Ahead!" poem reprinted in his second collection, New Encounters, and in many volumes, anthologies and samplers; Russia, Soviet Union
- Eugenio Montale, La fiera letteraria poetry criticism; Italy
- Nizar Qabbani, Childhood of a Breast, Syrian poet writing in Arabic
- Ole Wivel, I Fiskens Tegn ("In the Sign of the Fish"), Denmark

== Awards and honors ==
- Nobel Prize in Literature: T. S. Eliot
- Consultant in Poetry to the Library of Congress (later the post would be called "Poet Laureate Consultant in Poetry to the Library of Congress"): Léonie Adams appointed this year.
- Pulitzer Prize for Poetry: W. H. Auden, The Age of Anxiety
- Fellowship of the Academy of American Poets: Percy MacKaye
- Canada: Governor General's Award, poetry or drama: The Rocking Chair and Other Poems, A. M. Klein
- North Carolina Poet Laureate: Arthur Talmage Abernethy (the first one to hold the office)

== Births ==
Years link to the corresponding "[year] in poetry" article:

- January 14 – Nasrollah Mardani (died 2003), Iranian poet
- January 22 – Timothy Steele, American poet and academic
- January 31 – Albert Goldbarth, American poet
- February 16 – Jeff Guess, Australian poet
- March 5 – Leslie Marmon Silko, Laguna Pueblo descent American writer, a figure in the "Native American Renaissance"
- March 28 – Iman Budhi Santosa, Indonesian writer
- April 6 – Anna Couani, Australian poet and teacher
- May 13 – R. S. Gwynn, American poet and anthologist associated with New Formalism
- May 16 – Manglesh Dabral (died 2020), Indian Hindi poet and journalist
- May 24 – Lorna Crozier, Canadian poet
- May 29 – David Waltner-Toews, Canadian poet, writer and veterinary epidemiologist
- June 11 – David Lehman, American poet and series editor for The Best American Poetry book series
- June 29 – John Ash, English-born poet and writer
- July 7 – Stephen Ratcliffe, American poet and publisher
- August 1 – Frank Stanford (died 1978), American poet
- August 20 – Heather McHugh, American poet
- September 9 – Sherod Santos, American poet and academic
- October 3 – Barrett Watten, American poet
- October 6 – Zakes Mda (Zanemvula Kizito Gatyeni Mda), South African novelist, poet and playwright
- October 7 – Diane Ackerman, American author, poet and naturalist
- October 9 – Ciaran Carson, Northern Irish poet and novelist
- October 18 – Ntozake Shange (pronounced En-toe-ZAHK-kay SHONG-gay) née Paulette Williams (died 2018), African-American playwright, performance artist, writer and poet
- November 14 – Kristina Lugn (died 2020), Swedish poet and dramatist
- November 29 – George Szirtes, Hungarian-born English poet and translator
- Also:
  - Ali Al Shargawi (علي الشرقاوي), Bahraini poet
  - Aung Cheint (died 2021), Burmese poet
  - Qassim Haddad, Bahraini free verse political poet
  - Umar Bin Hassan, American poet
  - Brian Henderson, Canadian poet and writer
  - Bob Holman, American poet
  - Lawrence Joseph, American poet, writer, essayist, critic, lawyer and law professor
  - Yitzhak Laor (יצחק לאור), Israeli poet, author and journalist
  - Denise Riley, English poet

== Deaths ==
Years link to the corresponding "[year] in poetry" article:

- January 2 – Vicente Huidobro (born 1893), Chilean poet
- February 1 – Jatindramohan Bagchi (born 1878), Bengali poet
- May 22 – Claude McKay (born 1889), Jamaican-born American writer, humanist, Communist and part of the Harlem Renaissance
- March 14 – Senge Motomaro 千家元麿 (born 1888), Taishō and Shōwa period Japanese poet (surname: Senge)
- June 17 – Changampuzha Krishna Pillai (born 1911), Indian, Malayalam-language poet and translator
- August 25 – Gordon Bottomley (born 1874), English poet, known for his verse dramas
- August 31 – Andrei Zhdanov, 52 (born 1896), Soviet government official and persecutor of poets, writers and artists; until the late 1950s, Zhdanovism, defined cultural production in the Soviet Union; reducing permissible culture to a straightforward, scientific chart, where a given symbol corresponded to a simple moral value; Zhdanov and his associates further sought to eliminate foreign influence from Soviet art, proclaiming that "incorrect art" was an ideological diversion
- December 13 – Michael Roberts, 46 (born 1902), English poet, writer, critic and broadcaster and teacher

== See also ==
- Poetry
- List of poetry awards
- List of years in poetry
