= Amin Saleh =

Bahraini screenwriter, poet, and translator

- Born: 1950 (age 75–76); Manama
- Occupations: Author, scriptwriter, poet, journalist, translator
- Writing career
- Language: Arabic, English
- Subject: Cinema
- Notable works: TV Series: Sea of Tales (1997). Film: The Barrier (1990). Books: Al-Gwashen (1989) and Less Engineering .. Less Maps (2000).
- Notable awards: Bahraini Medal First Degree from the King of Bahrain, 2007.

Amin Saleh (1950) (Arabic:أمين صالح) is a Bahraini author, scriptwriter, poet, journalist, and translator. He translated many global literary and cinematic works to Arabic. He wrote about 20 screenplays for TV series and seven scripts for film dramas. His 1990 movie, Al Hajez or "The Barrier" was the first long film in Bahrain. In 2007, Saleh was honored with Bahraini Medal First Degree from the King of Bahrain.

== Biography ==
Saleh was born in Manama, in 1950. He received his high school education from a local school in Bahrain in 1967, then got a Bachelor's degree in English literature. He worked in the finance department of various travel agencies. He traveled to France to study at the cinema academy but could not finish his studies.

== Cultural activities ==
Saleh began his literary journey in 1973, when he published his short stories collection "Hona al warda, hona narqos" or (Here is the Rose, Here we Dance). He is considered one of the first translator in the Kingdom of Bahrain. He translated many global literary and cinematic works to Arabic, such as "Film as a Subversive Art" by Amos Vogel and "Sculpting in Film" by Andrei Tarkovsky. In addition, some of his books have also been translated to other languages.

Saleh wrote about 20 screenplays for TV series and seven scripts for film dramas. In 1990, his movie Al Hajez or "The Barrier" was the first long Bahraini film. In 2008, he was chosen as the head of the judging committee for the film competition for the Saudi Film Festival. He is also a member of Bahrain Writers Circle, the "Owal Theater" in Bahrain, and Bahrain Cinema Club.

== Works ==
=== Books ===
- Here is the Rose, Here We Dance, 1973.
- Butterflies, 1977.
- Royal Hunting, 1982.
- Oghnyat Alf Saad Alola, 1982.
- Game, 1983.
- The Port's Regrets, The Wind's Regrets, 1987.
- The Elements, 1989.
- Al-Gwashen, 1989.
- Hymn to the Cosmic Chamber, 1994.
- Praises, 1997.
- Less Engineering .. Less Maps, 2000.
- A Slight Death, 2001.
- Face and Shadow in Film Acting, 2003.
- Al-Ghaib Hostages, 2004.
- And The Houses That Also Sailed, 2006.
- Writing with Light: In Cinema, Trends and Issues, 2008.
- Thirteen Doors Open to a Cloud Fence, 2010.
- In the north ... to a House Missing the South, 2013.
- My Pockets are Full of The Seasons, Water Springs, 2018.
- Water and Its Shade, 2019.
- Poetry of Cinema, 2020.

=== Translations ===
- Film as a Subversive Art, 1995.
- Sculpting in Film, 2006.
- Interview with Federico Fellini, 2007.
- Surrealism in the Eyes of Mirrors, 2008
- Theo Angelopoulos's Film World: The Innocence of the First Gaze, 2009
- Abbas Kiarostami: A Cinema Embroidered with Innocence, 2011
- Conquest of the Useless: Reflections from the Making of Fitzcarraldo, 2013.
- Oedipus Rex, 2019.

=== Television series ===
Some of his television series include:

- Ahl Eldar, 2014.
- Hanin Elsahara, 2014.
- Ay Damaa Hozn La, 2013.
- Hadeel Allayl, 2009.
- Quyud alzaman, 2006.
- The Nebula, 2002.
- Niran, 2000.
- Ghanawi Almortaheen, 1999.
- Doors, 1998.
- Sea of Tales, 1997.
- Saneou Altarikh, 1996.
- Black and White, 1995.
- Alharib, 1995.
- Coloured Television, 1994.
- Halat, 1993.
- Salt and Gold, 1992.
- Beth gher mubashar, 1991

=== Films ===
Some of his films include:

- The Barrier, 1990.
- The Cage, 2009.

=== Plays ===
- Alatash, 1983.
- Alarabah, 1988.
- Unis and the Others, 1989.
- Rumiyu al-Farij (Romeo the Unparalleled), 1992.
- Majnoun Layla and other plays, 2006.

== Awards and honors ==
- He was honored by the Bahrain Writers Circle in 2006.
- In 2007, Saleh was honored with Bahraini Medal First Degree from the King of Bahrain.
- He was also honored by the Awal Theatre in 2008.

== See also ==
- Abdullah bin Ali bin Jabber Al Zayed
- Fareed Ramadan
- Ali Almossawi
