= Rama and the Dragon =

1980 novel by Edwar Al-Kharrat

- Author: Edwar Al-Kharrat
- Language: Arabic
- Publisher: Arab Institute for Research & Publishing
- Publication date: 1980
- Publication place: Lebanon
- Media type: Novel
- Pages: 329

Rama and the dragon is a 1980 novel by Egyptian writer Edwar al-Kharrat. 16 years after its initial publication, the novel was followed by two sequels, The Other Time and The Certainty of Thirst which formed a trilogy. It was voted one of the best 100 Arabic novels by the Arab Writers Union. The novel was awarded the Naguib Mahfouz Medal for Literature.

== Plot and themes ==
The novel is told as a dialogue between Mikhail, who is Coptic, and Rama, who is Muslim. The majority of novel is set in Egypt during the 1960s and 1970s, and includes flashbacks to the 1940s.

Rama and the Dragon incorporates mythological, Pharaonic, Greek and Islamic elements. The novel is a great example of Edwar al-Kharrat's literature in talking about the experimental novel with its own investigations and in-depth research into the aesthetics of the languages, in addition to the writer's reliance on the torrent of awareness technique that permeates the text's fabric through the character of "Rama", which in turn is also deeply rooted with the stream of conciseness technique "Mikhail" and his own thoughts and inner monologues that uncovers many memories.

== Publication ==
Rama and the Dragon was first published in 1980 Beirut. An English translation of the novel by Ferial Ghazoul and John Verlenden was published by American University in Cairo Press in 2002.

== Critical reception ==
Rama and the dragon was well received by critics, who praised the novel's experimental structure. Novelists including Badr al-Deeb, Sami Khashaba, Sabry Hafez, and Maher Shafik have expressed their admiration for the novel.

Sami Khashabah says in his study about how "Rama and the Dragon is an Egyptian tragedy" and specifically about the importance of "Rama and the Dragon" novel, and the significance of expressing it through this style of writing: “When Edwar Al-Kharrat wrote this novel, he wrote it in a clear way, expressing the experience of lost love that the Egyptian Coptic scholar lives, whose culture was built around the fact that he is Coptic looking through things in that way, and to his community and language and from his own understanding of his history".

Rama and the dragon was awarded the Naguib Mahfouz Medal for Literature.
