= Bahrain Writers Association =

Professional association based in Bahrain

- Bahrain Writers Association headquarters in Zinj
- Formation: 1969-09-29
- Founded at: Manama, Bahrain
- Members: General Union
- Official language: Arabic
- Affiliations: Arab Writers Union, the Afro-Asian Writers Association

The Bahrain Writers Association (Arabic: أسرة الأدباء والكتاب في البحرين) is a Bahraini professional association for writers. It was established in 1969 and is headquartered in the Zinj neighborhood of Manama. Committed to social mobility, their motto is “Words for Humanity.” The organization is an associate member of the Arab Writers Union and the Afro-Asian Writers Association. The Bahrain Writers Association seeks the following:

To stimulate quality production in literature, culture, and general thought, to encourage literary and intellectual research and interest in Arab history at the local and national levels, and to move literature in a direction that serves society and develops social awareness, in addition to sponsoring the intellectual movement and working toward its prosperity.

== History ==
The Association was founded on September 29, 1969, by 16 charter members among Bahrain's writers, including Mohammed Jaber Al-Ansari, Hussain Rashid Al-Sabbagh, Hamda Khamis, Munira bint Faris Al Khalifa, Muhammad Al-Majid, Khalifa al-Arifi, Yusef Hassan, Ahmed Al-Mannai, Rashid Najem Mansour Hashem, Muhammad Abd al-Malik, Khamis al-Qallaf, Khalaf Ahmad Khalaf, Alawi al-Hashimi, Qassim Haddad, and Ali Abdullah Khalifa. Al-Ansari was appointed its first president.

== See also ==
- Bahraini literature
- Culture of Bahrain
