= Ahlaam Muhammed =

Bahraini actress

- أحلام محمد
- Born: August 18, 1955 (age 70)
- Occupation: actress
- Years active: 1972—Present
- Spouse: Abdullah Youssef

Ahlaam Muhammed (Arabic: أحلام محمد, August 18, 1955), is a Bahraini actress and broadcaster. She is married to fellow actor Abdullah Youssef.

== Acting career ==
Partial theatre career
Year	Title	Playwright	Director
1975	1-1=1, an interpretation of The Sultan’s Dilemma	Tawfiq al-Hakim	Khalifa al-Arifi
1978	The Actors Throw Stones at Each Other	Farhan Bulbul	Abdullah Youssef
1986	The Nukhidha’s Daughter	Aqueel Swab	Abdullah Youssef
1995	Khor Al-Madai	Ali Al Shargawi	Jamaan Alrowaiei
2008	A Land That Does Not Grow Flowers	Mahmoud Diab	Abdullah Youssef

Television filmography
Year	Title	Role
1978	Al-Aqdar	Aisha
1984	Fayez Al-Toush	
1990	Bin Aql	
1992	Salt and Gold	
1997	Al-Qarar Al-Akheer	
1999	Suspicion Paths	
2001	Lail Al Banader	
2002	Sahem Al-Ghader	
2003	Aweisha	
2003	One Face Is Not Enough	
2015	Iftah Ya Simsim, Fatima	Fatima
2018	Mahtet Entzar	

== Journalism ==
She served as a radio anchor at Bahrain Radio and Television Corporation, reading news bulletins and emceeing live variety and cultural programs.

== Awards ==
- 1997, Best Actress in a Supporting Role, وجوه (“Faces”), Fifth Gulf Cooperation Council Theatre Festival, Kuwait
- 2000, Best Actress, ازهار مريم (“Maryam’s Flowers,” a radio series), 26th Cairo Radio and Television Festival
- 2001, Certificate of Appreciation, Suspicion Paths, 7th Gulf Radio and Television Festival
- 2003, Best Actress, Aweisha, 30th Cairo Radio and Television Festival
- Muharraq Pioneer, Al-Muharraq SC
