= Zinj =

Zinj may refer to:

- Paranthropus boisei, nicknamed "Zinj" for its former name Zinjanthropus boisei
- Zinj, Bahrain, a suburb of Manama, Bahrain
- Zinj, alternate spelling of Zanj, a medieval area of the East African coast
- Zinj - name of the fictional lost city in Michael Crichton's 1980 novel Congo, and its 1995 film adaptation
