= Al Jazira Supermarket =

Retail chain in Bahrain

- Industry: Retail
- Founded: 1965; 61 years ago
- Founder: Khalil Murtaza Dawani
- Headquarters: Manama, Bahrain
- Number of locations: 15 stores
- Area served: Bahrain
- Key people: Abdul Hussein Khalil Dawani (chairman), Ujjal Kumar Mukherjee (CEO)
- Products: Groceries
- Website: aljazirasupermarkets.com

Al Jazira Supermarket is a Bahraini chain of supermarkets. It was founded by Khalil Murtaza Dawani in 1965 and is headquartered in Zinj, Bahrain. The supermarket chain is owned and operated by Al Jazira Group. It presently houses 15 stores across the country.

== History ==
Al Jazira's informal inception took place in the early 1950s when Khalil Murtaza Dawani started trading foreign food products at the Manama Souq. Soon, he went on to establish a formal foodstuff trading company on Qassim Al Mehza Road in Manama. Products imported from the UK, Holland, Denmark, and India were sold and distributed throughout Bahrain.

In 1965, Al Jazira as it is known today was founded with its first store in Adliya.

In 2020, Al Jazira introduced the concept of express stores, which is a mini supermarket mostly located in gas stations and provides grab and go type products. The first express store of such kind was opened in Sehla. Al Jazira operates a food service division as an independent business unit with its own warehouse and logistics facility. Over the years, the company has diversified its activities to retail, clothing and fast food stores in various shopping centers around Bahrain.

In June 2004, the company was restructured to be known as Al Jazira Group.

As of April 2024, Al Jazira operates fifteen retail outlets and five express stores across Bahrain.
