= Edwar al-Kharrat =

Egyptian novelist, writer and critic

Edwar al-Kharrat إدوار الخراط
- Born: 16 March 1926; Alexandria, Kingdom of Egypt
- Died: 1 December 2015 (aged 89)

Edwar al-Kharrat (Arabic: إدوار الخراط; 16 March 1926 – 1 December 2015) was an Egyptian novelist, writer and critic.

== Early life ==
He was born in Alexandria to a Coptic Christian family. He studied law at Alexandria University and worked briefly in banking and insurance. He was also actively engaged in left-wing politics and spent two years in jail from 1948 to 1950. He moved to Cairo in the mid-1950s where he worked for a time as a translator at the Romanian embassy.

== Writing ==
Al-Kharrat has been described as "one of Egypt's most influential fiction writers" and "one of the most important writers in the Arab world". He was a leading figure among the group of Egyptian writers known as the Sixties Generation, and founded and edited the literary journal Galerie 68, considered to be the mouthpiece of that generation. In this role, al-Kharrat promoted and disseminated the works of such writers as Sonallah Ibrahim, Bahaa Taher, Ibrahim Aslan, Yahya Taher Abdullah, and Gamal al-Ghitani. He also had a lengthy association with the Afro-Asian Peoples' Solidarity Organisation (AAPSO) and the Afro-Asian Writers' Association, and edited Lotus, a journal of African and Arabic literature.

As a writer, his first book was a collection of short stories called High Walls, published in 1958/59. Two more volumes of stories came out in the 1970s. Also in 1979, his first novel Rama and the Dragon was published to widespread critical acclaim. A "daringly experimental" work, Rama has been called "a breakthrough for the Arab novel". Al-Kharrat himself described the novel as "untranslatable", although an English translation was completed by Ferial Ghazoul and John Verlenden and published by the AUC Press in 2002 after winning the 1999 Naguib Mahfouz Medal for Literature. The Arab Writers Union ranked Rama at 8th in its list of the 100 best Arabic novels.

Al-Kharrat has also translated a number of foreign literary works into Arabic, including Tolstoy's War and Peace. He has won several prestigious literary awards including the Sultan al-Owais Prize and the Naguib Mahfouz Medal. He was invited to St Antony's College, Oxford in 1979 as a visiting scholar and has participated in numerous cultural festivals, including the London Literature Festival in 1999. He died on 1 December 2015, aged 89.

== Works ==
- Rama and the Dragon, translated by Ferial Ghazoul and John Verlenden
- City of Saffron, translated by Frances Liardet
- Girls of Alexandria, translated by Frances Liardet
- Stones of Bobello, translated by Paul Starkey

== See also ==
- List of Egyptian writers
