= Ali Al Shargawi =

Bahraini poet and playwright (born 1948)

- علي الشرقاوي
- Born: Ali bin Ahmed bin Jassim Al Shargawi; 1948 (age 76–77); Manama, Bahrain
- Occupation(s): poet, playwright, lyricist
- Spouse: Fathiya Ajlan

Ali Al Shargawi (Arabic: علي الشرقاوي) is a leading Bahraini poet, lyricist and playwright whose work has been translated into English, German, Bulgarian, Russian, Kurdish, and French. Born in Manama in 1948, he started publishing his poetry in 1968, and quickly gained prominence in Arab newspapers and magazines.

His involvement in the theatre began when he joined the Awal Theatre Company, the oldest theatre group in Bahrain. In 2002, he was awarded Best Play in Bahrain's Theatrical Authorship Competition and was a recipient of the Sheikh Isa bin Salman Al Khalifa Medal in 2001 and the Competence Medal in 2002. x (Arabic: x) is a Bahraini.

== Biography ==
Ali bin Ahmed bin Jassim Al Shargawi was born in 1948 in the capital of Manama. He obtained his high school diploma in 1967 and an undergraduate degree from the Institute of the Humanities in Iraq in 1971 before attending further schooling in the United Kingdom in 1981. In the early 1970s, he joined the Bahrain Writers Association, for which he often published and administrated, including several sessions as president beginning in 1980. A member of the Awal Theatre Company, he has participated in literary festivals and conferences such as the Mirbad Poetry Festival, Jerash Festival, Jenadriyah, and the Cairo International Book Fair. He is a member of the Arab Writers Union.

== Work ==
Kamil Salman Al-Juburi writes that “in his poetry, there is a mystical flow through important experiences of homeland, prison, sea, and imprisonment, and he is rich in material and generous in phrase.” First publishing his poetry in 1968, he has seen his work featured in local and Arab newspapers and magazines and translated into other languages (including English, German, Bulgarian, Russian, Kurdish, and French). He has also translated British, Canadian, and Hindi poetry in addition to writing plays for children and adults.

== Personal life ==
He is married to fellow poet Fathiya Ajlan, with whom he has two sons. In April 2016, he was hospitalized for coronary artery disease.

== Publications ==
Poetry collections in Modern Standard Arabic:

- الرعد في مواسم القحط البحرين (“Thunder in the Seasons of Bahrain’s Drought”, 1975)
- نخلة القلب (“Heart of Palm”, 1981)
- تقاسيم ضاحي بن وليد الجديدة البحرين (“Taqsim for the Birth of a New Bahrain”, 1982)
- هي الهجس والاحتمال (“Obsession and Possibility”, 1983)
- رؤيا الفتوح البحرين (“Vision of the Conquest of Bahrain”, 1983)
- المزمور 23 (لرحيق المغنّين شين) (“Psalm 23: For the Nectar of Shin Singers”, 1983)
- للعناصر شهادتها أيضا أو المذبحة البحرين (“The Elements Also Testified, or the Bahrain Massacre”, 1986)
- مشاغل النورس الصغير البحرين (“Bahrain’s Small Seagull Concerns”, 1987)
- ذاكرة المواقد البحرين (“Memory of Bahrain’s Hearths”, 1988)
- مخطوطات غيث بن اليراعة البحرين (“The Manuscripts of Ghaith bin Al-Yara’a”, 1990)
- واعربـاه البحرين (“Bahrain Expresses”, 1991)
- مائدة القرمز البحرين (“The Crimson Table of Bahrain”, 1994)
- الوعله بيروت (“Alwaa Beirut”, 1998)
- كتاب الشين البحرين (“The Shin Book of Bahrain”, 1998)
- من اوراق ابن الحوبة بيروت (“From the papers of Ibn Al-Hobah, Beirut”, 2001)

Poetry collections in Bahraini Arabic:

- أفا يا فــلان (“Ava, So-and-so”, co-written with Fathiya Ajlan 1983)
- أصداف البحرين (“Bahraini Shells”, 1994)
- بر وبحر، مواويل (“Land and Sea”, mawwal, 1997)
- لولو ومحار، الجزء الأول (“Lulu and Oysters”, Part 1, 1998)
- سواحل صيف (“Summer Shores”, 2000)
- برايح عشق (“Great Love”, 2001)
- حوار شمس الروح (“Sun-Soul Dialogue”, 2001)
- لولو ومحار (“Lulu and Oysters”, Part 2, 2001)
- البحر لا يعتذر للسفن (“The Sea Does Not Apologize to the Ships”, 2011)

Plays:

- مفتاح الخير (“The Key to Virtue”, children’s, 1984)
- الفــخ (“The Trap”, children’s, 1989)
- الأرانب الطيبة (“Kind Rabbits”, children’s, 1990)
- بطوط (“Donald”, 1990)
- الســمؤال (“The Question”, 1991)
- ثلاثية عذاري (“Triple Excuse”, 1994)
- خور المدعي (“Khor Al-Madai” or “The Prosecutor’s Creek,” Bahraini Arabic, 1995)
- البرهامة (“Brahma”, 2000)
- تراجيديا المحرق (“The Tragedy of Muharraq”, 2012)

Poetry collections for children:

- أغاني العصافير البحرين (“Bird Songs of Bahrain”, 1983)
- شجرة الأطفال (“A Child’s Tree”, 1983)
- قصائد الربيع (“Spring Poems”, 1989)
- الاصابع (“Fingers”, 1991)
- الأرجوحة (“Swing”, 1994)
- اغاني الحكمة (“Songs of Wisdom”, 1996)
- العائلة (“The Family”, 2000)
- اوبريت يد الغضب (“Operetta Hand Fury”, 2000)
- الأمنيات (“Wishes”, 2002)

== See also ==
- Theatre of Bahrain
- Literature of Bahrain
- Culture of Bahrain
- National Theatre of Bahrain
