= Arab Socialist Ba'ath Party – Egypt Region =

Arab Socialist Ba'ath Party – Egypt Region حزب البعث العربي الاشتراكي- مصر
- Ideology: Ba'athism; Saddamism
- Regional affiliation: Iraq-based Ba'ath Party
- Colors: Black; Red; White; Green (Pan-Arab colors)
- Slogan: "Unity, liberty, socialism"
- House of Representatives: 0 / 568

Party flag

The Arab Socialist Ba'ath Party – Egypt Region (Arabic: حزب البعث العربي الاشتراكي- مصر Hizb Al-Ba'ath Al-Arabi Al-Ishtiraki – Misr) is an Egyptian Ba'athist political party. It is the Egyptian regional branch of the Iraqi-led Ba'ath Party.

The party supports the removal of Bashar al-Assad as President of Syria while opposing any foreign intervention in the conflict, whether by Israel, Turkey or Iran, as the party believes all such countries have ulterior motives and seek to undermine Syria.

The party was outlawed in the early 1990s and two Iraqi Intelligence Officials were detained on 14 April 1991 with $38,000 in their possession, money which the Egyptian authorities claimed was to be used to fund sabotage operations in Egypt.

Several other Egyptian Ba'athists, including the poet Muhammad Afifi Matar, were also detained in April 1991 on suspicion of involvement in an Iraqi terrorist plot.
