= Ali Al Jallawi =

Bahraini poet, researcher and writer

- Born: 1975 (age 50–51); Manama, Bahrain
- Occupations: Poet, researcher, writer.

Ali Al Jallawi (in Arabic علي الجلاوي born in 1975) is a Bahraini poet, researcher and writer. After two periods of imprisonment for writing poetry critical of the political regime in Bahrain, Al Jallawi has gone on to publish seven volumes of his work, most recently Tashta’il karazat nahd, 2008. He has written books on the Baháʼí and Jewish communities in Bahrain, and presented his poetry at dozens of literary festivals both in the Arab world and elsewhere. In Manama, he ran a research center dedicated to raising awareness of Bahrain's minority communities. However, during the Bahraini uprising, he fled the country to avoid further imprisonment. The PEN committee organized a literary fellowship in Weimar for him to save him a lengthy application for political asylum in Germany. By May 2012, he was still living in Germany, now as a fellow of the Akademie der Künste in Berlin. He is currently working on a novel titled Yadallah's Shoes.

== Description ==
He began writing as a teenager. In those early years, his poetry was characterized by a focus on revolutionary and political ideals. The expression of these beliefs ultimately led to his imprisonment in the mid-1990s. His incarceration, which provided an abundance of time for reflection, brought about a shift in his poetry. His work has shifted from explicitly radical politics to more philosophical explorations of the human condition. His contemporary writing style contrasts from the traditional poetry of Bahrain.

== Appearances ==
Ali Al Jallawi has attended many international and pan-Arab poetry festivals and gatherings to represent Bahrain, including:

- Bait Al-Hikmah, United Kingdom, 1998
- Damascus University, Damascus, Syria
- 29th International Exhibition Book, Kuwait
- Bahrain Cultural Week in Amman, Jordan
- Arab Cultural Capital Festival, Sanaa, Yemen, 2004
- Aseela Festival, Hawar Islands, Bahrain
- 6th GCC Poetry Festival, Riyadh, Saudi Arabia
- Arab Cultural Capital Festival, Khartoum, Sudan, 2005
- Poetry Tent, Zagora, Morocco, 2006
- International Poetry Forum, Marrakesh, Morocco, 2006
- International Poetry Festival of Medellín, Medellín, Colombia, 2014

== Publications ==
- Wajhan li-mra’atin wahida, Dar Al Kunooz, Beirut.
- Al ‘Isyan, Dar Al Mada, Syria.
- Al Madina Al Akhira, Arab Foundation for Studies and Publication, Beirut.
- Dilmuniyat I, Dar Aalia, Kuwait.
- Dilmuniyat II, Dar Kan’aan, Syria.
- Dilmuniyat (both parts, new edition), Ministry of Culture, Yemen, 2004.
- Tashta’il karazat nahd, Al Intishar Al Arabi, Beirut, 2008.

== Poetry ==
The wisdom of Hallaj

Whenever the heart strives
It commits errors
We know

But
That which is not said by the poem
The prophets understand.

Mansur al-Hallaj: born around 858 in Persia, mystic, writer and teacher of Sufism.
