= Muhammad Afifi Matar =

Egyptian poet

Muhammad Afifi Matar (Arabic: محمد عفيفي مطر; 1935 – 28 June 2010), was an Egyptian poet. He was born in the village of Ramalat al-Anjab in the Menoufia region of the Nile Delta. He went to school in Menouf and afterwards moved to Cairo where he studied philosophy at Ain Shams University.

== Early life ==
During the reign of Anwar Sadat, Matar left Egypt for Iraq and lived there for several years due to his difficulties with the military regime. During this period of self-imposed exile, he kept up his work as a poet and edited a literary journal called al-Aqlam. He was also a member of the Egyptian Ba'ath Party and was one of six people arrested in April 1991 on accusations of involvement in an anti-government plot.

== Career ==
Matar is recognised as one of the more difficult of modern Arab poets. The scholar and translator Ferial Ghazoul has written: "Muhammad 'Afifi Matar [...] is known for the sophistication of his poetics, and the multiple allusions in his poetry. He is a poets' poet who has kept his trajectory apart from other literary schools and cliques. His voice is passionate and singular." The poet and translator Desmond O'Grady called him "one of the most difficult poets in contemporary Arabic."

== Awards and honours ==
Matar received numerous cultural prizes in the Middle East including the prestigious Al Owais Prize. He published more than a dozen volumes of poetry during his lifetime. A book of his poems Quartet of Joy was translated by Ferial Ghazoul and John Verlenden and won the Arkansas Arabic Translation Award. He also contributed the text to an art book called, Twilight Visions in Egypt’s Nile Delta with photographs by Ann Parker. He was honored also in Kfrazayat city with the poet Abdelghani Mustafa Abdelghani in 1986.

== Death ==
Afifi Matar died in Cairo of liver complications.
