= Architecture-Studio =

French architecture firm

Architecture-Studio is a French architecture firm known for the Seat of the European Parliament in Strasbourg, the Arab World Institute in Paris (together with Jean Nouvel), and the Notre-Dame-de-l'Arche-d'Alliance Church in Paris. Architecture-Studio has been developing over the years and has established an office in Shanghai, and CA'ASI in Venice, Italy.

== History ==
Architecture-Studio was created in 1973 in Paris.

After the 2001 Shanghai world exposition, Architecture-Studio began to grow in China.

== Philosophy ==
Architecture-Studio defines architecture as "an art that is socially committed and engaged in the construction of mankind's living environment". Architecture-Studio's work is based on group culture, developing a real team work through a collective conception of Architecture; a will to go beyond individual interests in favour of dialogue and debate, thereby transforming all individual knowledge into collective creative potential.

Architecture-Studio believes that this also involves being open to encounters that can alter the way of thinking or, at least, inflect it (a book, a film, a man, a mistake on a building site…). This approach is a key to the conception process; a process which is not linear but iterative, not static but dynamic, not only intellectual and abstract but organic and concrete.

== Associates ==
Carried by this open-minded attitude, Architecture-Studio's team has progressively grown. Martin Robain, the founder, has been joined by:

- Rodo Tisnado (since 1976);
- Jean-François Bonne (since 1979);
- René-Henri Arnaud (since 1989);
- Alain Bretagnolle (since 1989);
- Laurent-Marc Fisher (since 1993);
- Marc Lehmann (since 1998);
- Roueida Ayache (since 2001);
- Gaspard Joly (since 2009);
- Marica Piot (since 2009);
- Mariano Efron (since 2009);
- Amar Sabeh El Leil (since 2009);
- Romain Boursier (since 2018);
- Widson Monteiro (since 2018) .

== Office and subsidiaries ==
- France, Paris :

10 rue Lacuée, 12e Arrondissement (main office);

- China, Shanghai :

Building 20# TongLeFang, No.555 HaiFang Road, Shanghai (subsidiary);

- Italy, Venice :

Campiello Santa Maria Nova, Cannaregio (CA'ASI, exhibition space).

== Main projects ==
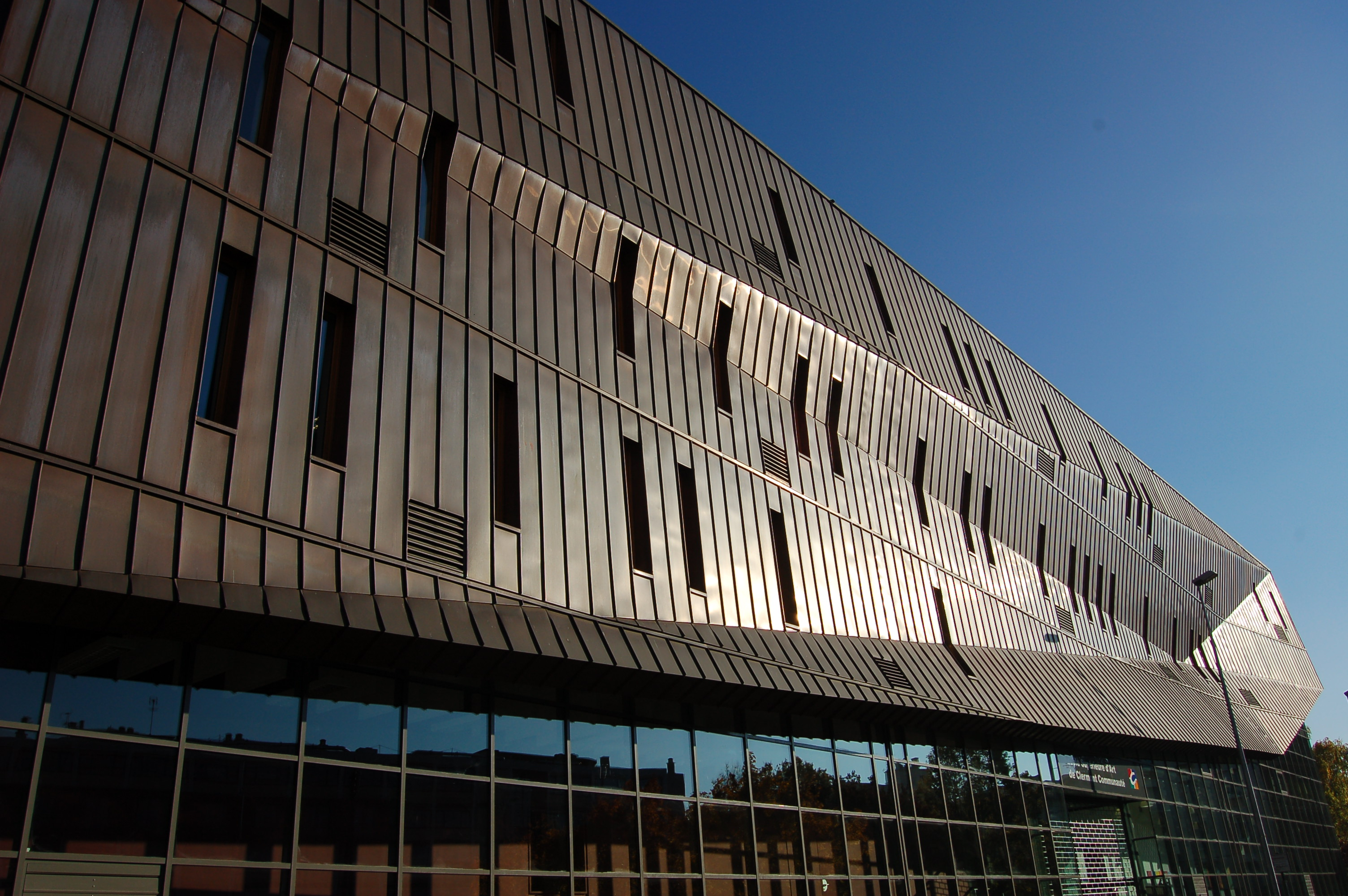
Arts High School in Clermont-Ferrand, 2006.

- 1987: Arab World Institute, Paris, together with Jean Nouvel,
- 1987: Futuroscope's Lycée Pilote Innovant, near Poitiers, France,
- 1990: University of the Citadelle, Dunkirk, France,
- 1991: Lycée des Arènes, Toulouse, France,
- 1994: Forum des Arènes, Toulouse, France,
- 1994: École des mines Engineering school, Albi, France,
- 1996: Courthouse, Caen, France,
- 1998: Notre-Dame-de-l'Arche-d'Alliance Church, Paris, France,
- 1999: Seat of the European Parliament in Strasbourg, France,
- 2002: Danone Vitapole Research Center, Palaiseau, France,
- 2003: Wison Group Headquarters in Shanghai, China,
- 2005: Avicenne Hospital complex, Bobigny, France,
- 2006: Fine-Arts School of Clermont-Ferrand, France,
- 2007: Company Headquarters for French supermarket company Casino, Saint-Étienne, France,
- 2011: Advancia Business School, Paris, France,
- 2011: Onassis Foundation Cultural Center, Athens, Greece.
- 2012: National Theatre of Bahrain, Manama, Bahrain.
