= National Theatre of Bahrain =

Building complex in Manama, Bahrain

- مسرح البحرين الوطني
- Side view of the Bahrain National Theatre
- Interactive map of National Theatre of Bahrain
- Address: Block 322; Manama; Kingdom of Bahrain
- Owner: Ministry of Works
- Capacity: 1,001 – Main auditorium 150 – Studio theatre
- Type: National

Construction
- Opened: 12 November 2012
- Architect: Architecture-Studio

Website
- Official website

The National Theatre of Bahrain (Arabic: مسرح البحرين الوطني, also known as the Bahrain National Amphitheatre) is a waterfront building complex situated in Manama next to the Bahrain National Museum, and consists of a main 1001-seat auditorium and a smaller 150-seat flexible studio theatre. Opened on 12 November 2012 and costing $50 million, the theatre encompasses an area of 11,869 square metres (127,760 sq ft) making it the third largest theatre in the Middle East.

== Construction ==
Plans for the construction of a new theatre originated in 2003 but had been delayed for unknown reasons. The establishment of a new and larger theatre would alleviate pressure on the aging 670-seat Cultural Hall theatre, which had struggled with hosting theatrical events during the Spring of Culture programs. In December 2007, the Works and Housing Ministry officially launched the project, having unveiled a conceptual design and scheduled construction to begin in June 2008 and to be completed by June 2010. Unknown reasons caused the delay of the project's construction until 2011.

The theatre itself was constructed on the demolished site of the Bahrain Heritage Village, which itself was a constructed in the 1980s and meant to be a replica of a typical Bahraini village. The Heritage Village was relocated to Arad in the neighbouring island of Muharraq in December 2009 to save costs.

Construction officially began June–July 2011 and carried on until November 2012. In July 2012, it was feared that the theatre's construction would not be completed in time to coincide with the country's already-scheduled culture programs. As a result, the Works ministry drafted a total of 700 people to work on the site, 625 of which worked during daylight and the rest during the night to ensure that no delays occurred. The main entrance's steel poles were fixed in July 2012 as well as the cladding walls of the main auditorium. Air conditioning units, leather and glass materials were put in place in the last months of construction.

== Design ==
National Theatre of Bahrain at night

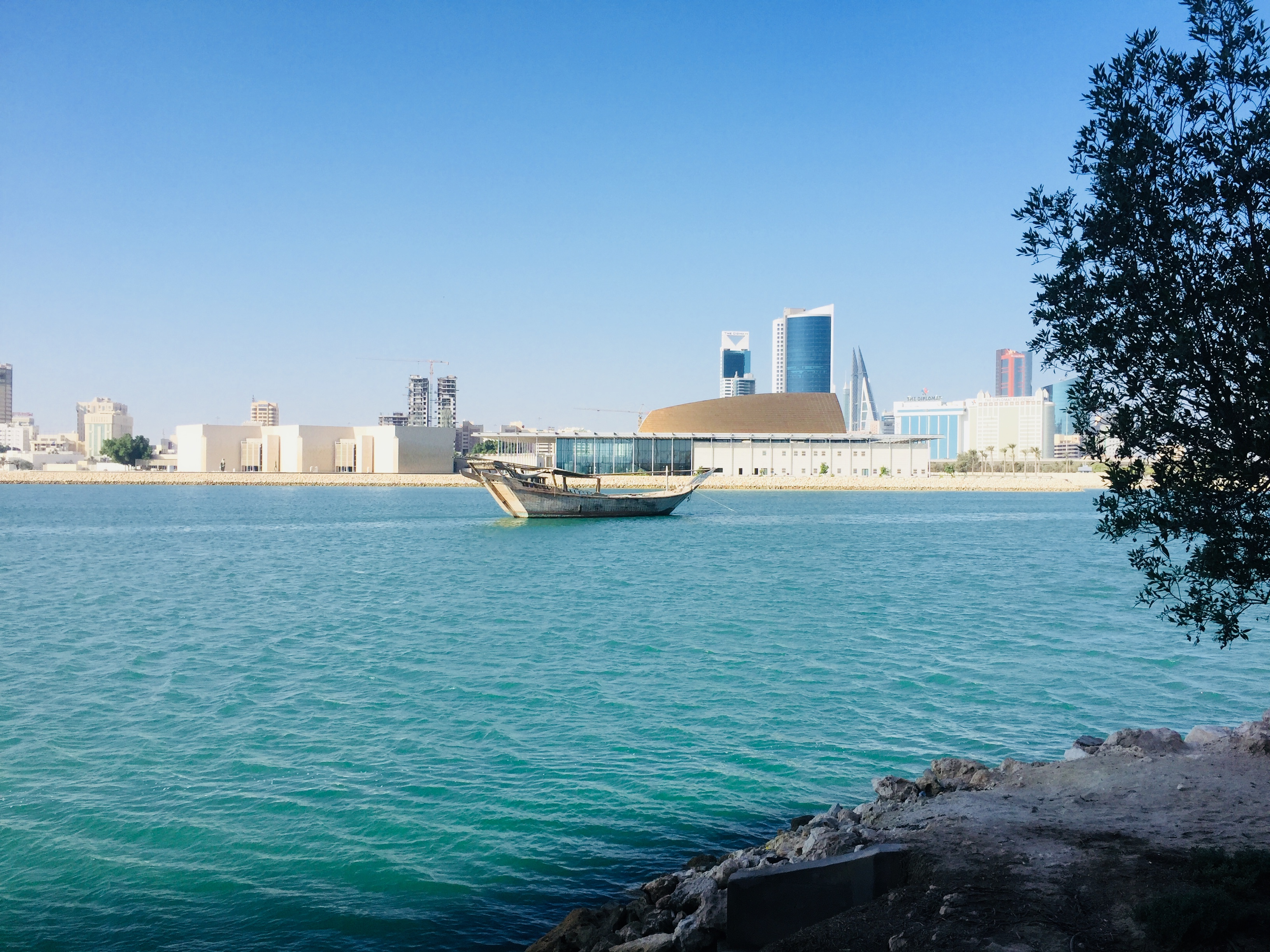
View of the theatre and a dhow from Muharraq island.

The theatre was designed by the French company Architecture-Studio, with Atkins serving as the local consultant. Other consultants were Theatre Projects Consultants, SETEC Bâtiment, XU Acoustique and L'Observatoire. The theatre's structure was built as a cubic glass shaped building, alongside an artificial lake which was meant to provide a promenade for visitors, with the roof coated in gold colouring- some commentators have dubbed the theatre as having an "Arabian Nights theme". The architects wanted the roof to create a "shimmering gold jewel" effect and as a result, the stainless steel cladding panels were measured down and sent to a British company Rimex to add an unidentified compound to produce this effect. The foyer's floor is made of Paloma stone from Italy, with the walls being made of glass which allows visitors to obtain an unblocked view of the lagoon outside. The glass relied on a unique glazing system that involved using 54mm thick glass panels that acted as the main structural component in holding the main glass in place. These main glass pieces were 11 metres (36 ft) high and were bonded with the glass fins of the structure using a special type of silicone with an Aluminium extrusion. Each glass fin weighed up to 800 kg.

The vertical columns supporting the roof were kept relatively narrow by designing a thick steel tube filled with concrete to serve as the wall. This was achieved by setting the columns in place and then having a cement slurry poured inside to stiffen them. The building's air-conditioning units had to be out of view of visitors for aesthetic reasons and a vent system has been designed that encompasses the entire perimeter of the building which brings cool air through hidden grilles between the glass. The 1001-seat auditorium's interior is clad with acoustically deafened Canadian Elmwood, which was meant to give visitors the impression of being on a Dhow. In fact, the 1001 seats symbolically represent the Thousand and One Arabian Nights. The seats face an 18 metres (59 ft) long stage in a raked seating method that was designed to improve the viewpoint for the audience. The forestage and proscenium, which covers an area of 19,000m x 10,500m, of the stage were specially modified to present a variety of different methods of staging, with the orchestra pit lying on top of Serapid LinkLift Systems to alter the size of the stage and auditorium. The Orchestra Pit Lift is made up of two halves for versatility. A seating wagon can be moved manually to fill the orchestra pit to enlarge the auditoriums capacity. The 150-seat studio theatre has dual purposes and can be used to host conferences and rehearsals as well as serving as a small theatre, with different seating arrangements and staging configurations. These seats and configurations can be transported around using a retractable seating unit and a demountable platform system where configurations can be constructed from a ready-made kit.

== Opening ==
The theatre was opened as scheduled on 12 November 2012 in an opening ceremony attended by the King of Bahrain Hamad bin Isa al-Khalifa. In his opening speech, he praised Bahraini members of the literary world and also praised Shaikha Mai bin Mohammed Al Khalifa, the culture minister who first suggested the construction of the theatre.

In November 2012, the theatre hosted its debut performance with Plácido Domingo performing at a waterfront concert, just days after the theatre opened. The second performance was Russian ballet gala organized by the Bolshoi Ballet Company in December 2012.

== See also ==
- Theatre in Bahrain
- Bahraini art
- Bahraini literature
- Culture of Bahrain
