= École supérieure d'art de Clermont Métropole =

Art school in Clermont-Ferrand, France

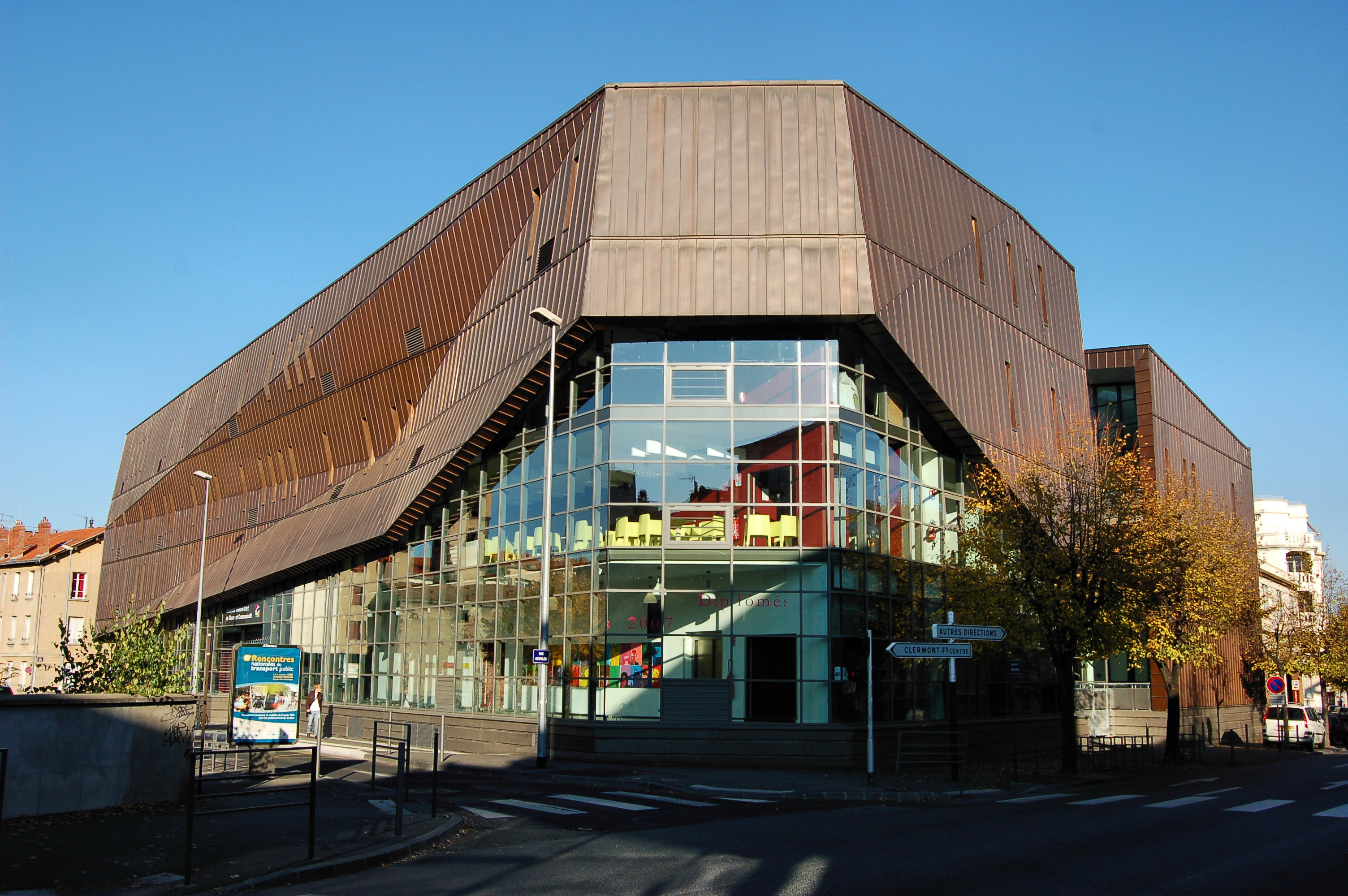
- Type: Public
- Director: Muriel Lepage
- Undergraduates: BA
- Postgraduates: Master
- Location: Clermont-Ferrand, France; 45.7684°N 3.0875°E
- Website: Official Website

The École supérieure d'art de Clermont Métropole (ESACM) is a higher education institution in Clermont-Ferrand, France, devoted to the teaching of art.

The college is accredited by the Ministry of Culture and Communication to award the following state diplomas:

- The DNAP (National Diploma in Visual Arts) after three years of undergraduate study
- The DNSEP (National Higher Diploma in Visual Expression) after five years of undergraduate and graduate study

The courses are harmonised with the European degree structure in accord with the ECTS system (European Credit Transfer and Accumulation System), facilitating student mobility within Europe.

== Location ==
The college is located in Clermont-Ferrand town centre. Since 2006, ESACM has been housed in a new 5,000-square-metre (54,000 sq ft) building in the heart of the university quarter. The building has been especially designed by Architecture-Studio for its needs.
