= Wison Group =

Chinese technology and electrical company

Wison Group (惠生集团)
- Company type: Private/Public (Wison Engineering)
- Traded as: 2236 HKEx
- Industry: Engineering; Energy
- Founded: 1997
- Headquarters: Shanghai, China
- Area served: Worldwide
- Products: Engineering, Project Management, Industrial Gas, Onshore and Offshore Energy Projects
- Number of employees: ~3,000
- Subsidiaries: Wison Engineering Ltd., Wison Offshore & Marine, Ltd., Horton Wison Deepwater Inc, and Genor BioPharma Co. Ltd.

Wison Group (Chinese: 惠生集团) is an engineering, procurement, and construction company, or EPC firm which focuses on the industries of energy and high-technology. The company attracted significant international coverage in the first half of 2012 by winning a contract to “engineer, procure, construct, install, and commission” (EPCIC) the world's first “floating LNG liquefaction, regasification, and storage unit” off the coast of Colombia. Wison also formed a consortium with Hyundai Engineering & Construction Co. to sign a contract with PDVSA, Venezuela's state-owned oil company, to expand PDVSA's Puerto La Cruz refinery.

== History ==
- 1997 Wison Chemical Engineering Co., Ltd. was established. The company focused on domestic petrochemical projects.
- 2003 Wison Group was established. Following this expansion, Wison Group moved into its current location at Zhangjiang Hi-tech Park in Pudong New Area, Shanghai.
- 2006 Wison Offshore & Marine was founded.
- 2008 Wison signed an EPC contract with CNOOC Shell for an Ethylene Cracking Furnace Debottlenecking Project, providing Wison with its first foreign-funded project. The company focused on producing CO and other gases.
- 2011 Wison Group Clean Energy Co., was established in Nanjing, China. Wison Engineering, together with Daelim of South Korea, signed a MDI project contract with BASF.
- 2012 Wison Engineering was officially listed on the Main Board of The Stock Exchange of Hong Kong Limited (“HKEx”) on December 28, 2012, and stock code is 2236

In 2014, the Wison Engineering Services and its chairman and majority owner Hua Bangsong were charged with bribery in China. Wison denied the charge.

== Operations ==
The Group is composed of four different business sectors: Engineering Services, Offshore & Marine, Clean Energy, and Emerging Business.

=== Engineering Services ===
Wison Engineering Ltd. provides engineering, construction and technical services for engineering projects in petrochemical industries. The Group works with foreign and domestic clients as a provider of design, procurement, construction management, and project planning consultation work. Partners and long-term clients include Shell and BASF.

As the largest private sector chemical engineering, procurement and construction management ("EPC") service provider in China in terms of revenue for 2011, as estimated by CMAI (Shanghai) Limited (CMAI), an independent industry consultant. The company specializes in the provision of construction and technical services for engineering installations in the petrochemical, coal-to-chemical and refining industries. Aside from the provision of EPC service, the Company manufactures integrated piping systems comprising heat-resistant alloy tubes and fittings through its wholly owned subsidiary, Wison (Yangzhou) Chemical Machinery Co., Ltd.

The company has developed various proprietary technologies, including HS-I, HS-II and HS-III cracking furnace proprietary technologies, certain MTO light olefins separation technologies and WMTO process technologies.

=== Offshore and Marine ===
Wison Offshore & Marine is a division of the Wison Group in the upstream oil and gas industry. This subsidiary focuses on design, project management, construction and operations of offshore oil projects. These include fixed platforms and modules, offshore lifting equipment mooring systems, and other types of oil and gas developments. Wison Offshore & Marine operates two fabrication yards that are dedicated to the construction of offshore oil and gas facilities.

=== Clean Energy ===
Wison (Nanjing) Clean Energy Co., Ltd. is a company within the Wison Group that utilizes coal as feedstock and uses production technologies to provide customers with a supply of chemicals, including hydrogen, carbon monoxide, sulfur, methanol and butyl-octyl alcohol in an eco-friendly manner. Wison Clean energy holds long-term contracts will domestic and international chemical corporations, including Celanese, BASF-YPC, DMAC, and Bluestar.

=== Emerging Business ===
In 2007, Gener BioPharma Co., Ltd., a company with a focus on creating novel human vaccines through antibody research, development, manufacturing, and commercialization, was introduced under the Wison Group name.

== Facilities ==
Wison Group Headquarters are in Shanghai, China, at the Zhangjiang Hi-Tech Park. The building was designed by Architecture-Studio, based in Paris, France. The firm also has a shipbuilding yard in Nantong, China, on the banks of the Yangtze River and is building a second fabrication facility in Zhoushan, China, that will be focused on the construction of onshore and offshore modules, large floating production hulls, topsides and jackets.

== Corporate social responsibility ==
In 2011, the Wison Group introduced the “Wison Shinai Prize in Literature.” The prize was introduced to encourage and promote innovation in Chinese schools. The first place prize is 100,000 yuan.

In 2005, Wison Group founded the Wison Art center at their headquarters in Shanghai to support local and international art. The center has shown works from famous painters including Chen Danqung and Chinese contemporary sculptor Wu Weishan.

== Major projects ==
In March, 2011, Wison Engineering, a subsidiary of Wison Group, finished construction on the world's largest single production capacity of an ethylene cracking furnace. The plant, with a production capacity is up to 192,000 tons/year, was handed over to BASF-YPC. The old record of 150,000 tons/year was also held by a cracking plant that Wison Group constructed.

In June, 2012, Wison Offshore & Marine, a subsidiary to Wison Group, was awarded the contract to build the 'world's first floating LNG Liquefaction, Regasification, and Storage unit.' Referred to as a FLRSU, the production unit will be delivered to Exmar under a contract with Pacific Rubiales Energy Corp. to start operation in Q4 2014 off the coast of Colombia. It will be a non-propelled barge, and will have a capacity of converting 69.5 million cubic feet (1.97 million cubic metres) per day of natural gas into LNG. It will be built in the Wison Offshore & Marine fabrication facility in Nantong, China. Additional assistance will be provided by the Houston, Texas branch of Wison Offshore & Marine. Black & Veatch will provide engineering and procurement of the topside liquefaction equipment.

== See also ==
- Zhangjiang Hi-tech Park
- List of Chinese companies
- Architecture-Studio
- Shanghai
