= Qassim Haddad =

Nadintahoon

- قاسم حداد
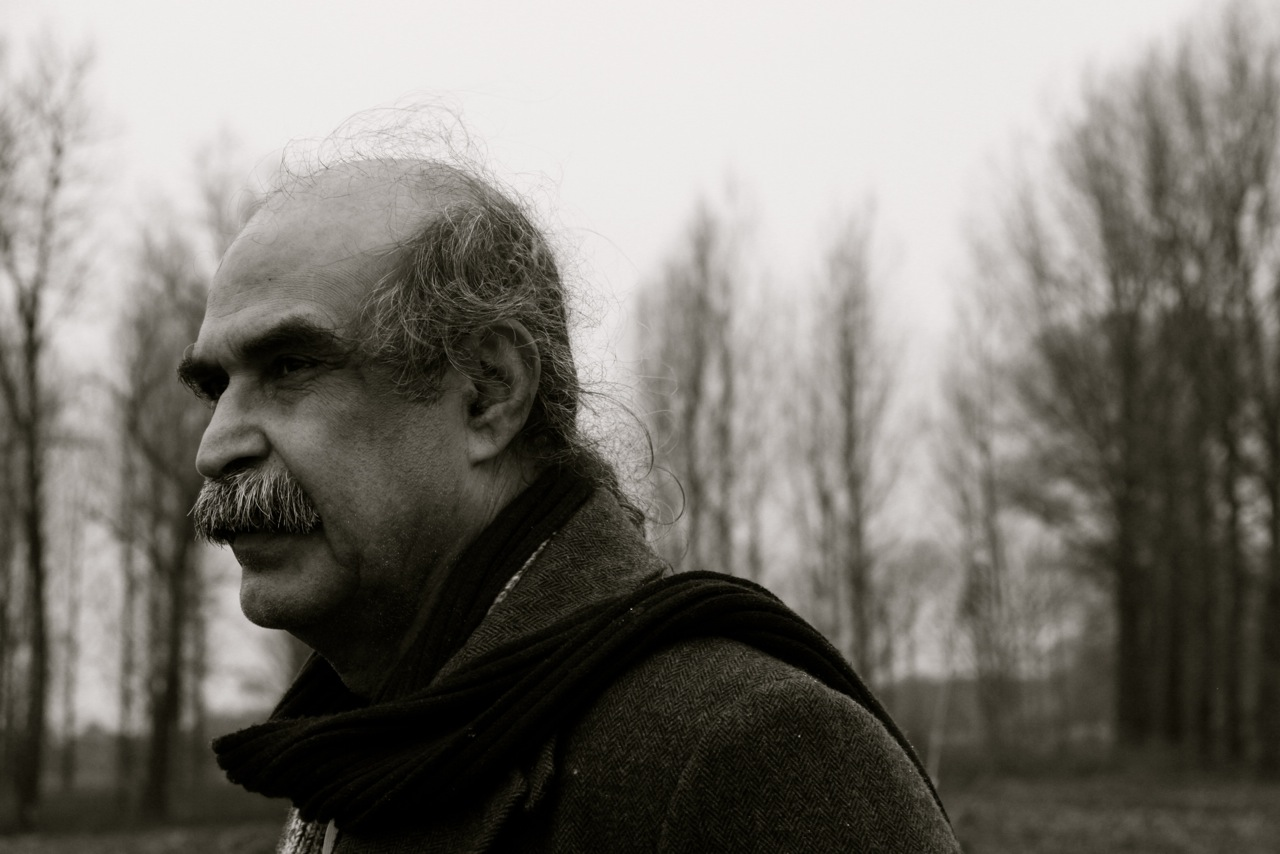
- Born: 1948 (age 77–78); Muharraq, Bahrain
- Occupation: poet
- Years active: 1970–present

Qassim Haddad (born 1948) is a Bahraini poet, particularly notable within the Arab world for his free verse poetry. His poems have been translated in several languages including German, English and French.

== Biography ==
Qassim Haddad was born in Bahrain in 1948 and did not complete his secondary education, having educated himself over the years. Haddad first rose to prominence with his poetry that contained revolutionary and political themes such as freedom. He published his first poetic collection titled Good Omen in 1970 and has since published more than 16 books, including Majnun Laila, a book of poetry and paintings, and a book of poetry in collaboration with Saudi photographer Saleh al-Azzaz. In 2007, Haddad created controversy when he reworked the Arabic classic Layla and Majnun, with Marcel Khalife which fundamentalists believed undermined Islamic morals.

He worked in the public library from 1968 to 1975, but was in and out of political incarceration for five years’ total between 1973 and 1980. In 1980, he joined the Culture and Arts Department at the Ministry of Information. His column, "وقت للكتابة" (“Time to Write”), has been syndicated weekly in a number of Arab publications since the early 1980s as well. His poems have been extensively translated, and he retired from the Ministry at the end of 1997.

Haddad is also the co-founder and chairman of the Bahraini Writers' Union.

== Personal life ==
He is married and has three children, including his son the noted composer Mohammed Haddad (born 1975) and his daughters Mehyar and noted photographer Tufool. He has three granddaughters (Amina, Ramz, and Lamar).

== Translations ==
Among the most prominent translations of Haddad's work are the collection علاج المسافة (“Distance Therapy”), rendered as Rimedio per la distanza in a translation to Italian by Fawzi Al Delmi by San Marco dei Giustiniani in Genoa, Italy. The American University in Cairo also launched a translation project spearheaded by John Verlenden (Professor of Rhetoric and Authorship) and Ferial Ghazoul (Professor of English Language and Comparative Literature, funding it through a $100,000 grant from the United States National Endowment for the Humanities.

Haddad's website جهة الشعر (“Jehat”) was launched in 1996 and posted Modern Standard Arabic poetry in its original form and translated into seven languages. In March 2018, however, new additions to the site were suspended due to lack of funds.

Haddad was awarded the “Arab Creativity Award” from the Lebanese Cultural Forum in Paris in 2000 and won the Al Owais Award in the poetry category in the 2000-2001 cycle. In 2017, he won the Aboul-Qacem Echebbi Award on its 2017 return to Tunisia after a hiatus since the Tunisian Revolution of 2011, along with the third Poet Mohammed Al-Thubaiti Prize in Saudi Arabia. In 2020, he was regaled at the Fifth Cairo International Forum for Arab Poetry.

Between 2008 and 2015, Haddad received four scholarships for literary residencies in Germany. He completed the book طرفة بن الوردة (“The Rose of Tarafa”) during a 2008-2011 residency at the German Commission for Cultural Exchange in Berlin, followed by a 2012 Jean-Jacques Rousseau Fellowship from the Akademie Schloss Solitude in Stuttgart, a 2013 grant from the Heinrich Böll Foundation in Cologne, and a 2014 PEN Centre Germany in Munich. These allowed him to complete the following freelance projects, besides the aforementioned طرفة بن الوردة:

- تجربتيّ (“My Experience”)
- أيها الفحم يا سيدي (“Oh, Sir Charcoal”)
- لستِ جرحاً ولا خنجراً (“You Are Neither a Wound Nor a Dagger”)
- نزهة الملاك (“Angel’s Outing”)
- فتنة السؤال (“The Sedition of Question”)
- النهايات تنأى (“Endings Disperse”)
- سماء عليلة (“An Ailing Sky”)
- تعديل في موسيقى الحجرة (“Revisions to Chamber Music”)
- مكابدات الأمل (“The Struggles of Hope”)
- يوميات بيت هاينريش بول (“Diary from the Heinrich Böll Foundation”)
- ثلاثون بحراً للغرق (“Thirty Seas of Drowning”)
- مثل وردةٍ تقلّد عطراً (“Like a Rose Imitating Perfume”)

== Work ==
Three phases can be distinguished in Haddad's poetic career. The first consists of his first three collections: البشارة (“Portents,” 1970), خروج رأس الحسين من المدن الخائنة (“The Exodus of Ras Al-Husayn from the Treacherous Cities,” 1972), and الدم الثاني (“The Second Blood,” 1975). In these three collections, his rhetoric and lyricism rejects the status quo and calls for revolution. The allusions are often to mythic figures such as Sisyphus, Scheherezade, Penelope, and Antarah ibn Shaddad, as well as to modern colonial resistance symbols such as Che Guevara, Vietnam, and Palestine.

The second phase includes the collections قلب الحب (“Love’s Heart”) and القيامة (“Judgment Day”), both published in 1980. These more experimentally introspective works transform the subjective ego into an objective collective one and include richer, more transcendent language. Many collections through 1991 continued to build on this theme.

The third stage builds on his interest in aesthetics, including linguistic experimentation and the use of sound, symbols, and metaphor. His 1983 collection شظايا (“Splinters”) is a long poem applying shock and tension to the lyric approach of the era.

His fourth stage centers on collaborations with artists in other media. These works include الجواشن (“Armour”), a long-form work co-written by novelist Amin Saleh; the aforementioned أخبارمجنون ليلى (“Majnun Laila,” painted by Iraqi artist Dia Azzawi and set to music by Marcel Khalife); جوه مع (“Faces”) with Bahraini painter Ebrahim Busaad, singer-songwriter Khaled El Sheikh, the poet Adunis, and the playwright Abdullah Youssef. المستحيل الأزرق (“The Blue Impossible”) with photographer Saleh al-Azzaz is a recent highlight, as are طرفة بن الوردة and أيها الفحم يا سيدي, both among his residency works and featuring the work of his photographer daughter Tufool and his composer son Mohammed.

== Publications ==
Publication list
Title	Publication year	Location: Publisher	Number of pages	Cover artist
البشارة (“Portents”)	1970 (1st ed.), 1984 (2nd. ed.)	Manama/Beirut: al-Sharikah al-ʻArabīyah lil-Wikālāt wa-al-Tawzīʻ (1st), Kuwait City: Dar al-Rabian (2nd)	199 (1st ed.), 198 (2nd ed.)	Abdullah al-Muharraqi (1st ed.), none (2nd ed.)
خروج رأس الحسين من المدن الخائنة (“The Exodus of Ras Al-Husayn from the Treacherous Cities”)	1972	Beirut: Dar al-Awda	91	Abdullah Youssef
الدم الثاني (“The Second Blood”)	1975	Manama: Dar al-Ghad	112	Abdullah Youssef
قلب الحب (“Love’s Heart”)	1980	Beirut: Dar Ibn Khaldun	100	Abdullah Youssef
القيامة (“Judgment Day”)	1980	Beirut: Dar al-Kalima/Dar Ibn Rushd	114	Joan Miró
شظايا (“Splinters”)	1981	Beirut: Dar al-Farabi	175	Salvador Dalí
المسرح البحريني التجربة والافق (“The Past and Future of Bahraini Theatre”)	1981 (1st ed.), 2018 (2nd ed.)	Manama: Ministry of Information/Information Affairs Authority (1st and 2nd eds.)	140	Abdullah Youssef
انتماءات (“Inclinations”)	1982	Beirut: Dar al-Farabi	128	
موضوعات حول العامية والشعر العامي (“Essays on Nabati Poetry,” with Abdul Rahman Rafi and Abdulqader Aqeel)	1983	Manama: Special Editions	48	
النهروان (“Nahrawan,” illustrated by Jamal Hashem)	1988 (1st ed.), 1997 (2nd ed.)	Al Hidd, Bahrain: Oriental Press (1st ed.), Cairo: Arab Press Agency (2nd ed.)	104 (1st ed.), 109 (2nd ed.)	Jamal Hashem
الجواشن (“Al-Jawashen,” with novelist Amin Saleh)	1989 (1st ed.), 1998 (2nd ed.)	Casablanca: Toubkal Publishing (1st ed.), Baghdad: Dar al-Mada Publishing (2nd ed.)	177 (1st ed.), 227 (2nd ed.)	Rachid Koraïchi (1st ed.), Abdullah Youssef (2nd ed.)
يمشي مخفورا بالوعول (“Escorted with the Mountain Goats”)	1990	London: Riyāḍ Najīb Al-Rayyis	108	
عزلة الملكات (“The Isolation of Queens”)	1991 (1st ed.), 1992 (2nd ed.)	Manama: Bahrain Writers Association Kalimat Notebooks (1st ed.), Cairo: Dar al-Ghad (illustrated by Omar Jihan) (2nd ed.)	102 (1st ed.), 79 (2nd ed.)	Khalid al-Hashimi (1st ed.), none (2nd ed.)
البيانات (“Statements,” with Adunis, Amin Saleh, and Mohammed Bennis)	1993 (1st ed.), 1995 (2nd ed.)	Manama: Bahrain Writers Association Kalimat Notebooks (1st ed.), Tunis: Dār Sirās (2nd ed.)	106 (1st ed.), 135 (2nd ed.)	Khalid al-Hashimi (1st ed.), Dār Sirās staff (2nd ed.)
نقد الأمل (“Criticism of Hope”)	1995 (1st ed.), 1998 (2nd ed.)	Beirut: Dār al-Kunūz al-Adabīyah (1st and 2nd eds.)	147 (1st ed.), 208 (2nd ed.)	Talib al-Daoud (1st ed.), Abdullah Youssef (2nd ed.)
أخبار مجنون ليلى (“Majnun Laila,” illustrated by Dia Azzawi)	1996	London: Arabesque	92	Dia Azzawi
قبر قاسم يسبقه فهرس المكابدات، تليه جنة الأخطاء (“Qasim’s Tomb”)	1997 (1st ed.), 2017 (2nd ed.)	Manama: Dar al-Kalima (1st ed.), Amman: Dar al-Ahlia (2nd ed.)	279 (1st ed.), 367 (2nd ed.)	Dia Azzawi (1st ed.), Zuhayr Abu Shayib (2nd ed.)
ليس بهذا الشكل ولا بشكلٍ آخر (“Not This Way, Not That Way”)	1997 (1st ed.), 2018 (2nd ed.)	Kuwait City: Qurtas (1st ed.), Kuwait City: Masarat (2nd ed.)	216 (1st ed.), 296 (2nd ed.)	Abdullah Youssef (1st ed.), Mohammed al-Saleem (2nd ed.)
الأعمال الشعرية (“Poetic Works,” 2 volumes)	2000	Beirut: Arab Institute for Research and Publishing	1176	Abdul Aziz Al-Halal
علاج المسافة (“Distance Therapy”)	2000 (1st ed.), 2002 (2nd ed.)	Tunis: Dar Tber Al Zaman (1st ed.), Beirut: Arab Institute for Research and Publishing/Manama: Ministry of Information (2nd ed.)	120 (1st ed.), 90 (2nd ed.)	none (1st ed.), Ebrahim Busaad (2nd ed.)
له حصةٌ في الولع (“He Has a Share of Fancy”)	2000	Beirut: Dar al-Intishar al-Arabi		Abbas Youssef
المستحيل الأزرق (“The Impossible Blue,” illustrated by photographer Saleh al-Azzaz, French and Malaysian translations by Abdellatif Laabi, English translations by Naeem Ashour)	2001		160	Saleh al-Azzaz
ورشة الأمل (“The Hope Factory,” history of Muharraq)	2004 (1st ed.), 2007 (2nd ed.)	Beirut: Arab Institute for Research and Publishing/Manama: Sheikh Ebrahim Center (1st and 2nd eds.)	231 (1st ed.), 292 (2nd ed.)	Zuhayr Abu Shayib
أيقظتني الساحرة ("The Witch Woke Me Up," (English translation by Dr. Muhammad al-Khuzai)	2004	Beirut: Arab Institute for Research and Publishing	160	Abbas Youssef
ما أجملك أيها الذئب.. جائع وتتعفف عن الجثث (“Oh Wolf, How Beautiful You Are”)	2006	Beirut: Arab Institute for Research and Publishing	244	Zuhayr Abu Shayib
لستَ ضيفاً على أحد (“Not a Guest Anymore”)	2007	Beirut: Arab Institute for Research and Publishing	168	Zuhayr Abu Shayib
فتنة السؤال (“The Sedition of Question”)	2008	Beirut: Arab Institute for Research and Publishing	362	Zuhayr Abu Shayib
دع الملاك (“Let the Angel”)	2008	Damascus: Dar Kanaan	111	Lubna Ahmad
الأزرق المستحيل يليه أخبار مجنون ليلى (“The Impossible Blue/Majnun Laila”)	2009 (double re-publication)	Cairo: Dar Al Nahda Al Arabeya	252	
إيقاظ الفراشة التي هناك (“Awaken the Butterfly Within,” anthology)	2009	Damascus: Ninawa Publishing House	232	Hussein Fakhr
الغزالة يوم الأحد (“The Sunday Gazelle,” anthology)	2010	Beirut: Dar al-Ghawoon	159	Maya Salem
طرفة بن الوردة (“The Rose of Tarafa,” with Tufool and Mohammed Haddad)	2011	Beirut: Arab Institute for Research and Publishing	531	Zuhayr Abu Shayib
مكابدات الأمل (“The Endurance of Hope”)	2012	Beirut: Arab Institute for Research and Publishing/Manama: Bahrain Authority for Culture and Antiquities	270	Zuhayr Abu Shayib
لستِ جُرحاً ولا خنجراً أنتِ البكاء الطويل في الليل (“You Are Neither a Wound Nor a Dagger, Only the Long Weeping of the Night”)	2012 (1st ed.), 2014 (2nd ed.)	Cairo: General Egyptian Book Organization (1st ed.), Beirut: Arab Institute for Research and Publishing (2nd ed.)	193 (1st ed.), 168 (2nd ed.)	Ahmed al-Labbad (1st ed.), Zuhayr Abu Shayib (2nd ed.)
النهايات تنأى (“Endings Disperse”)	2013	Beirut: Arab Institute for Research and Publishing/Manama: Sheikh Ebrahim Center	128	Zuhayr Abu Shayib
سماء عليلة (“An Ailing Sky,” anthology)	2013	Isa Town, Bahrain: Masaa Publishing	103	Tufool Haddad
الأعمال النثرية (“Prose Works,” 3 volumes)	2014	Beirut/Dubai: Madarek Publishing	504 (1st vol.), 763 (2nd vol), 502 (3rd vol.)	Qassim Haddad
أيها الفحم يا سيدي (“Oh, Sir Charcoal,” with Tufool and Mohammed Haddad, inspired by the notebooks of Vincent van Gogh)	2015 (1st ed.), 2016 (2nd ed.)	Bahrain: Masaa Publishing (1st ed.), Manama: Special Editions (2nd ed.)	417 (1st ed.), 431 (2nd ed.)	Tufool Haddad
يوميات بيت هاينريش بول (“Diary from the Heinrich Böll Foundation,” with photography by Tufool Haddad)	2016	Beirut: Arab Institute for Research and Publishing/Manama: Bahrain Authority for Culture and Antiquities	261	Tufool Haddad
تعديل في موسيقى الحجرة (“Revisions to Chamber Music”)	2017	Amman/Ramallah: Dar al-Ahlia	208	Zuhayr Abu Shayib
رشيقٌ كالوقت ولا بيتَ له (“Agile as Time and Without a Home”)	2017	Beirut: Arab Institute for Research and Publishing	296	Zuhayr Abu Shayib
مثل وردة تقلّد عطراُ (“Like a Rose Imitating Perfume”)	2017	Kuwait City: Dar Kalemat	121	Tufool Haddad
ثلاثون بحراً للغرق (“Thirty Seas of Drowning”)	2017	Milan: Al-Mutawassit	160	Khalid Nasiri
رفيف الظل (“Rafif’s Shadow,” with journalists Saad Al-Dosari and Adel Khozam)	2018	Beirut/Dubai: Madarek Publishing	165	
لا تصقل أصفادك (“Don’t Polish Your Handcuffs,” complete anthology)	2019	Kuwait City: Takween	271	Yousef Al-Abdullah
عزلة الملكات وعلاج المسافة (“The Isolation of Queens/Distance Therapy”)	2019 (double re-publication)	Dubai: Al Owais Awards Foundation	212	Tufool Haddad
موسيقى الكتابة عن ايقاظ الذاكرة وصقل المرايا (“Writing Music Is about Awakening Memory and Refining Mirrors”)	2019	Beirut: Arab Institute for Research and Publishing	200	Zuhayr Abu Shayib
ما الأمل؟ (“What Hope?”)	2020	Beirut: Arab Institute for Research and Publishing	280	Zuhayr Abu Shayib
جوهرة المراصد (“Jewel Collection”)	2021	Sharjah, United Arab Emirates: Rewayat Books	331	Qassim Haddad
أنطولوجيا النصوص المقدسة (“The Ontology of Sacred Texts”)	upcoming			

== Public appearances ==
=== Festivals ===
Festival appearances
Festival	Year	Host country
3rd Al-Marbad Poetry Festival (Baghdad)	1974	Iraq
10th Asilah Arts Festival (Asilah)	1987	Morocco
Spanish-Arabic Poetry Festival (Sanaa)	1990	Yemen
14th Cairo International Film Festival	1990	Egypt
Qurain Cultural Festival	1994	Kuwait
1st Arab Poetry Festival (Muscat)	1995	Oman
3rd Qurain Cultural Festival	1996	Kuwait
Cairo Creative Poetry Festival	1996	Egypt
Al-Babtain Spring Poetry Festival (Al-Adwani Cycle)	1996	Abu Dhabi
Rabat Poetry Festival	1997	Morocco
16th Jerash Festival	1997	Jordan
5th Gulf Cooperation Council Theatre Festival	1997	Kuwait
Amsterdam Immigration Foundation Arab Culture Festival	1998	Netherlands
Les Voix de la Mediterranée Festival (Lodève)	1999	France
Arab World Institute Spring Poetry Festival (Paris)	2000	France
2nd Arab Poetry Festival (House of Jordanian Poetry, Amman)	2001	Jordan
German-Arab Poetry Festival (Sanaa)	2001	Yemen
International Poetry Festival of Medellín (Medellín)	2001	Colombia
1st Jableh Cultural Festival (near Latakia)	2004	Syria
11th Qurain Cultural Festival	2004	Kuwait
26th Asilah Arts Festival	2004	Morocco
4th Al-Mutanabbi International Poetry Festival (Zurich)	2004	Switzerland
14th Amman International Theatre Festival (6th Arab Theatre and Poetry Session)	2007	Jordan
8th Karneval der Kulturen (Berlin)	2008	Germany
Arabesque: Arts of the Arab World Festival (Kennedy Center in Washington, D.C.)	2009	United States
Jordan Festival (Amman)	2009	Jordan
Poetry on the Road Festival (Bremen)	2011	Germany
International Festival of Literature and of Young People's Literature	2011	Algeria
10th Les Voix de la Mediterranée Festival	2011	France
33rd Asilah Arts Festival	2011	Morocco
1st Cairo International Poetry Festival	2014	Egypt
Khan al-Funoun	2016	Jordan
Sharjah International Book Fair	2016	United Arab Emirates
38th Asilah Arts Festival	2016	Morocco
Voix Vives de Méditerranée en Méditerranée Festival (Sète)	2017	France
50th Cairo International Book Fair Golden Jubilee	2019	Egypt
34th Jerash Festival	2019	Jordan

=== Seminars ===
Seminar appearances
Seminar	Year	Host country
Joint Cultural Work Symposium	1985	Kuwait/Saudi Arabia
Georgetown University Centennial Poetry Symposium (Washington, D.C.)	1989	United States
Palestinian Intifada Symposium (Sanaa)	1989	Yemen
Aboul-Qacem Echebbi International Symposium (Fez)	1994	Morocco
Al-Arabi Sympsoium on Arab Culture and the Prospects for Digital Publishing	2001	Kuwait
Amal Abul-Qassem Donqol Symposium (Achievements and Values) (Supreme Council of Culture)	2003	Egypt
UNESCO Symposium on Book Publication	2005	France
Al-Babtain Symposium for Poetic Creativity	2013	Morocco

=== Conventions ===
Convention appearances
Convention	Year	Host country
1st Lebanese Writers’ Union Conference (Beirut)	1984	Lebanon
Literary Criticism Conference (Towards a New Vision of Literary Theories, University of Bahrain)	1993	Bahrain
2nd Lebanese Writers’ Union Conference (Beirut)	1994	Lebanon
German-Arab Poetry Conference (Sanaa)	2000	Yemen
PEN Centre Germany Conference	2012	Germany

=== International Conferences ===
International conference appearances
Conference	Year	Host country
French-Arab Poetry Encounter (Grenoble/Rabat)	1986	France/Morocco
Arab Poetry Encounter (Nantes)	1990	France
1st Arab Poetry Forum	1997	Tunisia
1st Arab Cultural Forum (Beirut)	1998	Lebanon
Saadi Shirazi Forum (Tehran)	2000	Iran
2nd Dar al-Mada Cultural Festival (Damascus)	2001	Syria
1st Young Arab Poets’ Forum (Sanaa): The 1990s and Prospects for Poetic Writing	2004	Yemen
3rd Cairo Forum for Creative Arab Novelists	2005	Egypt
Arab Poetry Conference	2006	Morocco
5th Cairo International Forum for Arab Poetry	2020	Egypt

== Studies of Haddad’s work ==
Critical studies
Year	Title	Researcher	Institution
1997	"تعددية الشكل في الكتابة الشعرية الحديثة - إنجاز قاسم حداد نموذجاً" (“Pluralism of Form in Modern Poetic Writing: Examples from the Work of Qassim Haddad”)	Mujib Zahrani	Gulf Poetry Festival (Bahrain)
1998	"الخطاب النقدي عند قاسم حداد وصلته بتجربته الشعرية - رؤية نقدية" (“Qassim Haddad’s Critical Discourse and its Connection to His Poetic Experience: A Critical Study”)	Abdullah Ahmad al-Muhanna	Kuwait University Journal of Gulf and Arabian Peninsula Studies
2004	"قاسم حداد : شاعر المخيلة" (“Qassim Haddad: Poet of Imagination”)	Mohammed Abdul Muttalib	26th Asilah Arts Festival
2007	"انماط الصورة في شعر قاسم حداد ديوان القيامة انموذجا" (“Visual Patterns in Qassim Haddad’s ‘Judgment Day’”	Ashwaq Ghazi Safih Al-Yasiri	University of Basrah Centre for Arab Studies
2013	"بنية اللغة الشعرية عند قاسم حداد" (“The Structure of Qassim Haddad’s Poetic Language”)	Omar Hasan al-Ameri	Yarmouk University Faculty of Arts, Department of Arabic Language and Literature
2015	"سيمياء البياض في شعر قاسم حداد" (“Decaying Whiteness in the Poetry of Qassim Haddad”)	Hussein Al-Ghadiri	University of Bahrain College of Arts
2016	"التعالق الاستعاري في الخطاب الشعري عند قاسم حداد (طرفة بن الوردة انموذجاً)" (“Allegory in the Poetic Discource of Qasim Haddad’s ‘The Rose of Tarafa’”)	Ali Sarmad Hussein/Farhan Badri Al-Harbi	University of Babylon College of Humanities
2019	"التجربة الشعرية لدى قاسم حداد" (“The Poetic Experience of Qassim Haddad”)	Tariq Fattouh	Nizwa Magazine
2019	"القصيدة التأويل، أو الشعر بينما يحدث: كيف ينظر قاسم حداد إلى العالم من خلال اللغة؟" (“Poetry As It Happens: How Does Qassim Haddad View the World Through Language?”)	Hatem al-Zahrani	Ma3a (online learning platform)
2019	"عالم قاسم حداد الشعري - دراسة نقدية" (“The World of Qassim Haddad: A Critical Study”)	Abdullah Khalifa	Ninawa Publishing, Damascus, Syria
2019	"أسلوبيّة تشكّل صورة الوطن ودلالتها في قصيدة “الصهيل” للشاعر قاسم حداد" (“Style’s Influence on a Nation’s Image in Qassim Haddad’s ‘The Neighing’”)	Fatima Sobhi Yazbek	Lebanese University Faculty of Arts and Humanities, Department of Arabic Language and Literature
2020	"خطاب المركز والهامش في شعر قاسم حداد : دراسة في ضوء علم النص" (“Discourse Between the Center and the Margin in the Poetry of Qassim Haddad: A Study in the Light of Textual Science”)	Fida al-Aidi	Hashemite University College of Arts, Department of Arabic Language and Literature
2020	"الكونُ موقفٌ: الشعريّة والنبوءة في أعمال قاسم حداد" (“The Universe Is a Stance: Poetics and Prophesy in the Works of Qassim Haddad”)	Miguel Merino	Georgetown University Center for Contemporary Arab Studies
