= Film as a Subversive Art =

Illustrated 1974 film history book by Amos Vogel

- Author: Amos Vogel
- Language: English
- Subject: Film history
- Genre: Non-fiction
- Publication date: 1974

Film as a Subversive Art is a fully illustrated 1974 film history book by Amos Vogel with mini-essays on over 600 films.

== Summary ==
The book was a catalogue of films that broke aesthetic, sexual and ideological boundaries.

== Selected examples ==
- Titicut Follies (1967)
- The War Game (1965)
- 2 or 3 Things I Know About Her (1967)
- W.R.: Mysteries of the Organism (1971)
- She Done Him Wrong (1933)
- Pickpocket (1959)
- Belle de Jour (1967)

== Publication history ==
The book was published by Random House, New York; it was re-printed in London by C.T. Editions with a new foreword and introduction by Scott MacDonald in 2005, and again in 2021 as a "remastered" edition by The Film Desk.

== Film ==
A documentary film of the same name about Vogel and directed by Paul Cronin was released in 2003.

== Editions ==
- Vogel, Amos (2005) [1974]. Film as a Subversive Art (Reprint ed.). C.T. Editions. ISBN 0-9547071-1-7.
