= Mohammed Jaber Al-Ansari =

Bahraini philosopher

Mohammed Jaber Al-Ansari, was a prominent Bahraini philosopher and political thinker, and a proponent of rational thinking in the 20th-century Arab World. He played an active l role in establishing the previously peripheral Persian Gulf region as an integral contributor to modern Arabic thought, on equal footing with other parts of the Arab World. His early work as a literary historian, and critic, instigated wide literary activity in his native Bahrain and in its surrounding Persian Gulf region. Al-Ansari was one of the early Arab intellectuals to delve into studying the East Asian experiences and draw comparisons with the Arab World.

== Life and work ==
Al-Ansari was born in Bahrain in 1939 (then a British protectorate). Al-Ansari's first philosophical interests were shaped during the Nasserite 1950s, when the Arab World was in the midst of its struggle against colonialism and the fight for the creation of Pan-Arab Unity. Al-Ansari started to publish soon after he obtained his BA from the American University in Beirut in 1962. His early work covered historical and contemporary literary work in his native Bahrain and its neighboring countries. Compiled in one volume titled "Glimpses at the Gulf" (لمحات من الخليج), the volume sheds light on previously little known authors in this region because of its distance from the centers of Arab literary activity (essentially Cairo and Beirut were most Arabic publication originated.)

In 1969, Al-Ansari co-founded Bahrain's Literary Association (أسرة الأدباء والكتاب) and became its first President. In the same year, he was appointed to the State Council (Bahrain's first national cabinet) which oversaw the country’s transition to independence from Great Britain. In 1971, Al-Ansari gave up his cabinet position to pursue his intellectual and academic career.

Al-Ansari received his Ph.D. in 1979. His dissertation which was published later in a volume titled Arabic Though and the Struggle of Opposites formed the base for his first intellectual project. The volume reveals Al-Ansari’s strategy of thinking and brings to light the main philosophical themes that he resonated in his later work.

In the following year, he published his major work, Transformation of Thought and Politics in the Arab East 1930-1970 (تحولات الفكر والسياسة في المشرق العربي 1930-1970), which won him the Kuwait Foundation for the Advancement of Science Award. This significant work had a profound impact on the re-orientation of the Twentieth Century Persian Gulf from a mere receiver of Arab intellectual products into a competent contributor to the philosophical, cultural and political discourse in the wider Arab World.

Al-Ansari moved to Paris in 1981, where he participated in the creation of L'Institut du Monde Arabe (The Arab World Institute). In 1983, Al-Ansari moved back to his Bahrain to become of one of the founders of the Arabian Gulf University where he became the Dean of the Higher Education Faculty until 2005.

In 1984, His Majesty the King of Bahrain (then the Crown Prince) retained Al-Ansari as his Cultural and Scientific Advisor.

Al-Ansari resided in Bahrain with his wife Aysha. He has three daughters and nine grand children. He is currently Professor of Islamic Civilization and Modern Thought at the Arabian Gulf University.

He died on 26 December 2024.

== Principal contributions ==
Professor Al-Ansari work encompasses two parallel intellectual projects:

1. Studying the Arab society's intellectual superstructure (criticism of Thought): demonstrated in three books. The first one was his Ph.D. dissertation Arabic Though and the Struggle of Opposites and two complementary volumes Diagnosis of the In-decision Syndrome in Arab Life and Querying Defeat.
2. Studying Arab society's intellectual infrastructure (criticism of Arab political conduct/reality): this project consisted of three volumes: The Political Composition of Arabs, and The Arab Political Quandary and The Arabs and Politics: Where is the Fault?

In his criticism of Arabic Thought, Al-Ansari promotes an indigenous methodology to interpret and understand the internal mechanisms adopted by Arab intellectuals in their diagnoses of the issues facing Arab societies throughout history. Al-Ansari coined the term ‘Arabic Syncretism’ to portray Arab intellectuals’ endeavors to reconcile the dialectical relationships formed between philosophy and religion, faith and reason, East and West etc. He concludes by exposing the inherent instability of this Syncretism because of its tendency to ferment a culture of deferment and ‘in-decision’. Throughout his work on this project, Al-Ansari uncovers the inability of Arabic Syncretism to sustain itself in the face of crises. This is further demonstrated through in-depth case studies of the rise and fall of the Nasserite (Egypt) and Ba'ath (Levant) experiments in twentieth century Arab Mashreq.

Al-Ansari's study of the Arab's political reality aims to rise above the rhetorical and ideological clutter prevalent in the Arab World to establish a rational sociological approach to understanding Arab politics. In his rational style, Al-Ansari traces the socio-political history of the Arabs and dissects the compositions and dynamics of the various phases in this history. Al-Ansari, asserts that the Arabs’ political quandary is a major impediment to their overall progress in the modern World as it was in their past. In Al-Ansari’s view, the Arab peoples despite their long and rich history never had the opportunity to develop a stable, institutionalized State. One reason for this is the constant influence of nomadic (as opposed to the settled) elements of the Arab society, the constant movement of the center of power and the failure to dismantle no-state loyalties (e.g. tribal loyalties) on the continuity of a stable and civil structure of the state. The direct impact of this is the absence of indigenous Arabic political traditions which in turn have an indirect impact on the possibilities for a natural progression to democratic rule.

== Awards ==
- State Award for Outstanding Achievement – Bahrain, 1983.
- Sultan Al-Owais Award for Humanities and Futurology Studies – United Arab Emirates, 1987.
- Munif Al-Razzaz Award for Thought – Jordan, 1983.
- General Book Organization Award for Best Book– Egypt, 2003
- Arab Thought Foundation Award – United Arab Emirates, 2006.
- Kuwait Institute for Scientific Progress – Kuwait, 1981.

== Principal works ==
- Arabs and the World in the Year 2000, العالم والعرب سنة 2000, Nicosia, Cyprus, Arab Establishment for Studies, 1988.
- Transformation of Thought and Politics in the Arab East 1930-1970, تحولات الفكر والسياسة في الشرق العربي 1930-1970, 2003, 3rd Edition.
- Arab Thought and the Struggle of Opposites الفكر العربي وصراع الأضداد, [Publisher], [date], [Edition].
- Were They Giants هل كانو عمالقة [Publisher], [date], [Edition].
- Glimpses at the Gulf لمحات من الخليج العربي [Publisher], [date], [Edition].
- Rejuvenating the Enlightenment through Discovery and Criticism of the Self تجديد النهضة بإكتشاف الذات ونقدها [Publisher], [date], [Edition].
- Arabs and Politics; Where is the Fault, [Publisher], [date], [Edition].
- Arabs' Political Predicament and Islam's Position, [Publisher], [date], [Edition].
- The Political Composition of the Arabs, [Publisher], [date], [Edition].
- The Cultural Interaction between the Maghreb and the Mashrq, التفاعل الثقافي بين المغرب والمشرق [Publisher], [date], [Edition].
- Maghreb Sensitivity and the Mashreqi Culture الحساسية المغربية والثقافة المشرقية [Publisher], [date], [Edition].
- A Qur'anic View of International Issues, Islam and the Modern Age رؤية قرآنية للمتغيرات الدولية وشواغل الفكر بين الإسلام والعصر [Publisher], [date], [Edition].
- The Suicide of Arab Intellectuals انتحار المثقفين العرب وقضايا راهنة في الثقافة العربية [Publisher], [date], [Edition].

== Institutional memberships ==
- Member, National Council for Culture and Arts – Bahrain.
- Founder and Member, Arab Thought Institute.
- Founder and Member, Arab World Institute – Paris, 1981.
- Member, Royal Moroccan Institute – Rabat.
