= Hamda Khamis =

- Born: 1945 (age 80–81); Bahrain
- Occupations: Poet, writer
- Writing career
- Language: Arabic

Hamda (or Hamdah) Khamis is a poet and a freelance columnist from Bahrain.

== Biography ==
Khamis was born in Bahrain in 1945.

In 1969, she published her first collection "Shayaza" (translates into 'Shrapnel' in English), thus becoming the first woman to emerge into the Bahraini poetry scene. Many other Bahraini female poets followed after her, and helped create Bahrain's thriving literary scene.

In 2013, Hamda Khamis was invited to the 23rd Abu Dhabi International Book Fair, where she helped display the Persian Gulf region's literary achievements with her poetry.

== Works ==
She has published nine collections of poetry. Some of her collections are listed below:

- An Apology to Childhood (Iʻtidhār Lil-Ṭufūlah, al-Baḥrayn: Dār al-Ghad, 1978)
- Shrapnel (Shayaza)
- The Bliss of Love

Her poems have also been translated into English, German, Spanish, and French.

A few of her poems were included in a poetry anthology titled, Gathering the Tide: An Anthology of Contemporary Arabian Gulf Poetry.

- Couple
- Ray
- Those Not For Me
- Without Reason

Several of the poems included in Gathering the Tide are from her collection The Bliss of Love. Other poems in the anthology, such as Ray explore why Khamis chooses to write poetry. A common theme in Khamis's poetry is a desire to escape the dissatisfaction and frustration with the domestic and worldly life, and move towards the abstract and cosmos.

The Abu Dhabi Authority for Culture and Heritage (ADACH) has also published her poem, "Equality", with English translations in a collection titled "Contemporary Poems from the Arabian Peninsula".

In 2010, Hasan Marhama (Bahraini editor) published an anthology Voices: An annotated anthology of contemporary Bahraini poetry. He includes Khamis's poem You Have Your Time, I Have Mine.

== Critical reception ==
The Worldmark Encyclopedia of Cultures and Daily Life references Hamda Khamis and Qasim Haddad as some of the most well recognized contemporary Bahraini poets. The Encyclopedia notes that in Bahrain, "Younger poets [such as Khamis and Haddad] have developed a more Westernized style, writing non-rhyming poems on personal and political subjects.".
