= Abdullah bin Ali bin Jabber Al Zayed =

- عبد الله الزايد
- Born: November 3, 1899; Muharraq, Bahrain
- Died: May 5, 1945 (aged 45); Manama, Bahrain
- Monuments: Abdullah Al Zayed House for Bahraini Press Heritage, Museum dedicated to the late journalist in Muharraq, Bahrain
- Occupations: Writer, journalist, poet, and dramatist
- Known for: Founding 'Al-Bahrain' (First newspaper in Bahrain) & bringing the first modern printing press to the country.
- Spouse: 1st Wife: Amna bint Zayed bin Sultan bin Majed Al Zayed 2nd Wife: Sabeeka bint Majed AlJassim
- Children: 11

Abdullah bin Ali bin Jabber Al Zayed (Arabic: عبد الله الزايد, January 1, 1899 – May 5, 1945) was a Bahraini dramatist, poet, and journalist. He was born in Muharraq, the son of a pearl merchant who plied the Persian Gulf. Al Zayed attended the school run by Sheikh Muhammad Saleh Yusuf, a graduate of Al-Azhar University. Although Al Zayed succeeded his father in the pearl trade, he remained in touch with the country's scholars and authors. Exiled politically to India from 1929 to 1932, he established the first modern printing press in the Gulf States and founded a cultural club in his hometown. In 1939, Al Zayed founded the newspaper Bahrain (Arabic: البحرين), which lasted for six years. He wrote stories and plays as well. Mubarak Al Khater compiled, edited, and published Al Zayed's works in 1996.

== Biography ==
Though some sources give Abdullah bin Ali bin Jabber Al Zayed's birthdate as January 1, 1899 (19 Sha’ban 1316 AH, others offer 1317 AH or around 1894 C.E. All agree he was born in Muharraq. He learned to write from Sheikh Isa bin Rashid in Muharraq, became a Hafiz (memorizer of the Quran) at an early age, and studied the Arabic language and fiqh (Islamic jurisprudence). After his kuttab education, he moved on to private school and studied Arabic with Sheikh Muhammad Saleh Yusuf at the school run by Ibrahim bin Mohammed bin Khalifa bin Salman Al Khalifa (Al-Madrasa Al-Ahlia), namesake of today's Sheikh Ebrahim Center. Al Zayed was one of the founders of the Literary Club of Muharraq and was its secretary. Working in the pearl trade before dedicating himself full-time to the arts, he established Bahrain's first modern printing press and library in 1932, founded a cinema and theater in 1937, and issued the island's first newspaper under the name Bahrain, which continued until his death. He co-founded the Committee for Poor Relief and also served as its secretary. Al Zayed also contributed to a number of charities and social activities related to events in Mandatory Palestine.

He died on May 5, 1945 (23 Jumada al-awwal 1364 AH) in Manama.

The Board of Trustees of the Sheikh Ebrahim Center restored his home as a museum of Bahrain's press heritage in November 2003.

A museum has been named and dedicated to him in Muharraq, Bahrain. Abdullah Al-Zayed House for Bahraini Press Heritage.

== Awards ==
He won first prize in the London Poetry Competition for his poems, الحرب والحرية (“War and Freedom”) and نهضة الشباب (“Renaissance of Youth”); also, he won third prize for الحنين إلى الوطن (“Homelessness”).

== Poetry ==
According to Abdulaziz Al-Babtain’s biographical dictionary of poets, Al Zayed’s poetry uses "traditional long forms expressed in a direct, reportable manner. Most of his poems revolve around issues salient at the time, such as East-West relations, Arab unity, and liberation from colonialism. His poems sing of the homeland and nostalgia." His poems range from elegies to odes of praise to polemics, and some of the most famous discuss the pain of the human soul, especially in his exile.

== Political Engagement ==
Al-Zayed co-founded Bahrain’s Literary Club, a major hub for nationalist politics, anti-colonial discussion, and Arab intellectual exchange. He strongly opposed British interference in Bahrain's internal sovereignty and municipal affairs. His vocal resistance made him a primary target of the British Political Advisor, Charles Belgrave.

His writings made him controversial towards the British; British authorities placed Al-Zayed under heavy surveillance and attempted to restrict his publishing activities. He also hosted prominent Arab literary and political figures (such as Ameen Rihani) and used his platform to advocate for Arab unity and resistance against foreign mandate.

Following his death in 1945, a senior official from the Minors' Funds department removed all of Al-Zayed's private papers and files from his residence; these historical documents subsequently disappeared, pointing to deliberate confiscation by authorities.

In 1920, Al-Zayed co-founded Al-Nadi Al-Adabi (The Literary Club), which acted as a primary gathering space for Bahraini nationalists and reformists resisting British colonial authority[cite: 6, 16]. Following the 1923 political crisis in Bahrain, Al-Zayed actively drafted secret petitions and communicated with regional leaders to defend local sovereignty.

=== Gulf Union Initiative (1944) ===
In 1944, Al-Zayed utilized Al-Bahrain newspaper to propose a historic framework for a unified federation of Arab Gulf states. Published in issue 264, his proposal advocated for political and economic integration among eleven Gulf territories, including Abu Dhabi, Dubai, Sharjah, Ajman, Umm Al-Quwain, Ras Al-Khaimah, Qatar, Al-Hasa, Bahrain, and Kuwait.

Al-Zayed outlined a seven-point platform designed to foster regional stability without infringing upon the local sovereignty of ruling families:

- Customs Alignment: Eliminating internal customs barriers between member states.
- Standardized Travel: Unifying travel passports across the region.
- Supreme Governance: Establishing a joint governing council composed of ruling Sheikhs.
- Educational Integration: Implementing a standardized educational curriculum across all states.
- Regional Logistics: Directing dedicated maritime fleets to facilitate transport and trade between the Emirates.
- Shared Funding: Creating a collective financial mechanism to cover union expenditure.
- Joint Defense: Establishing a unified military force for mutual security and coastal defense.

Al-Zayed frequently authored political commentary anonymously or under pseudonyms to evade colonial authorities, contributing secret articles to regional publications like Al-Rabita Al-Arabiyya.

=== Political Stance on Palestine ===
Al-Zayed was a supporter of the Palestinian cause, using his platform as a journalist to rally public support across the Gulf region. In ''Al-Bahrain'', he consistently condemned European colonial policies and foreign mandates in the Middle East. Following the outbreak of World War II, Al-Zayed focused heavily on opposing British mandate policies in Palestine and warning against the displacement of its native population. His key positions included:

- Opposition to Partition: He strongly opposed early proposals to partition Palestine, arguing for the preservation of its territorial integrity and Arab identity.
- Resistance to Jewish Immigration: He published sharp critiques against organized European Jewish immigration to Palestine, warning that demographically altering the region would lead to long-term instability across the Arab world.
- Calls for Solidarity: He framed the defense of Palestine not merely as a localized struggle, but as a collective obligation for all Arab nations, appealing directly to Gulf populations and leaders to provide political and financial support. Despite strict British military censorship and emergency press regulations imposed during World War II, Al-Zayed continued to publish anti-colonial commentary on Palestine.

== Works ==
- ديوان عبد الله الزائد (“Divan of Abdullah Al Zayed”), 1996 compilation by Mubarak Al Khater
- عدالة الله،(“God’s Justice”), 1934 play
- يوم إنزال السفن (“The Day the Ships Landed”), short story

He also wrote a number of speeches that survive on social and political issues.

== Personal Life ==
Al-Zayed was married twice:

First Marriage: Married Amna bint Zayed bin Sultan Al-Zayed, with whom he had five children: Ali, Latifa, Hessa, Moza, and Sabika.

Second Marriage: Married Sabika bint Majed Al-Jassim, with whom he had six children: Abdulrahman, Jassim, Mohammed, Abdulaziz, Mariam, and Aisha.
