= Ferial Ghazoul =

Iraqi scholar

Ferial Jabouri Ghazoul
- فريال جبوري غزول
- Born: Iraq
- Citizenship: Iraq
- Occupations: Scholar, critic, translator, professor
- Known for: Comparative literature, postcolonial studies, translation
- Title: Professor of English and Comparative Literature
- Board member of: Founding editor of Alif: Journal of Comparative Poetics
- Awards: Arkansas Arabic Translation Award

Academic background
- Education: Comparative literature
- Alma mater: Columbia University (PhD, 1978)
- Thesis: (1978)
- Influences: Edward Said, Louis Althusser, Paul Ricoeur, Michael Riffaterre

Academic work
- Discipline: Comparative literature
- Sub-discipline: Postcolonial studies, Arabic literature, literary translation
- Institutions: American University in Cairo
- Main interests: Comparative literature, translation, postcolonial studies
- Notable works: Nocturnal Poetics: The Arabian Nights in Comparative Context; Arab Women Writers: A Critical Reference Guide, 1873-1999

Ferial Jabouri Ghazoul is an Iraqi scholar, critic, and translator. She was educated in Iraq, Lebanon, Britain, France, and the USA. She obtained her PhD in comparative literature from Columbia University in 1978. Currently, she is chair and professor of English and comparative literature at the American University in Cairo.

== Career as a scholar ==
As a scholar, Ghazoul has a number of significant publications, notably the encyclopaedic Arab Women Writing: A Critical Reference Guide, 1873-1999 (2008) which she co-edited with Radwa Ashour and Hasna Reda-Mekdashi. The book was chosen by Choice journal as one of the Outstanding Academic Titles of the year. Among other works, Ghazoul is the author of Nocturnal Poetics: The Arabian Nights in Comparative Context (AUC Press, 1996). Her principal research interests are comparative literature and postcolonial studies, and she has written numerous scholarly articles, book reviews and book chapters on these topics. She is the founding editor of Alif: A Journal of Comparative Poetics, one of the AUC's flagship journals.

== Career as a translator ==
As a literary translator, Ghazoul is a past winner of the Arkansas Arabic Translation Award. Ghazoul and co-translator John Verlenden won the award for their translation of Muhammad Afifi Matar's volume of poetry Rubaiyat al-farah (Quartet of Joy). The duo have also translated Edwar al-Kharrat's classic novel Rama and the Dragon, and in July 2010, they received a $100,000 grant from the National Endowment for the Humanities to translate the works of the Bahraini poet Qassim Haddad. Besides translating a considerable amount of Arabic poetry, Ghazoul has translated critical works from English and French into Arabic. Below is a list of the diverse genres and authors that she has translated so far:

- Poetry: Muhammad Afifi Matar, Muhammad Sulayman, Qassim Haddad, Fadwa Tuqan, Mourid Barghouti, Jabra Jabra, Sami Mahdi, Adunis, Mahmoud Darwish, Abdel-Moneim Ramadan, Amal Dunqul, Ibrahim Nasrallah, Anton Shammas, Nazik al-Mala’ika
- Novel: Edwar al-Kharrat
- Short story: Anita Desai
- Autobiography: Muhammad Afifi Matar
- Critical theory: Edward Said, Abdel-Wahab Meddeb, Louis Althusser, Paul Ricoeur, Charles Sanders Peirce, Michael Riffaterre
- Essays: Ibrahim al-Koni, Ahlam Mosteghanemi, Alifa Rifaat, Abdo Wazen, Saadi Youssef
- Interview: Edward Said

== Selected works ==
=== As author ===
- Nocturnal Poetics: The Arabian Nights in Comparative Context
- The Arabian Nights: A Structural Analysis

=== As editor ===
- Arab Women Writers: A Critical Reference Guide, 1873-1999 (co-edited with Radwa Ashour and Hasna Reda-Mekdashi)
- Edward Said and Critical Decolonization (editor)
- The View from Within: Writers and Critics on Contemporary Arabic Literature (co-edited with Barbara Harlow)
- Alif: Journal of Contemporary Poetics (founding editor)

=== As translator ===
- Quartet of Joy by Muhammad Afifi Matar (co-translated with John Verlenden)
- Rama and the Dragon by Edwar al-Kharrat (co-translated with John Verlenden)
- Solomon Rex by Muhammad Sulayman
