= Fawziyya al-Sindi =

Bahraini poet and activist

- Born: 1957 (age 68–69); Manama, Bahrain
- Education: University of Cairo
- Occupations: poet and activist
- Known for: published six collections of Arabic poetry, translated into several languages

Fawziyya al-Sindi (born 1957) is a Bahraini poet and activist. She has published six collections of poetry since 1982 and her work has been translated into several languages.

== Biography ==
Fawziyya was born in Manama, Bahrain in 1957. She has been acknowledged as one of the first Bahraini women to seek an education abroad, having obtained a degree in commerce from the University of Cairo.

Fawziyya published six collections of Arabic poetry from 1998 to 2005. She is a member of the Bahraini Association of Writers and regularly writes as a columnist to regional magazines and publications like Banipal.

== Publications ==
- Akhir Al-Mahab (End of the Horizon) 1998
- Malath Al-Rooh (Refuge of the Soul) 1991
- Rahinat Al-Alam (Hostage to Pain) 2005
