= Khalifa al-Arifi =

Bahraini actor, director and writer (born 1946)

- خليفة العريفي
- Born: Khalifa bin Hassan al-Arifi; 1946 (age 79–80)
- Occupations: actor, writer, director
- Years active: 1967—Present
- Father: Hassan Ali al-Arifi

Khalifa al-Arifi (Arabic: خليفة عريفه, born 1946) is a Bahraini actor, director, and writer, considered one of the pioneers of theatre in Bahrain. He helped found many institutions, including the Bahrain Writers’ Association, the Awal Theater, and the Bahrain National Cultural Forum. He also wrote short stories and novels, in addition to stage and television screenplays, and he directed extensively.

== Short stories ==
Short stories
Publishing date	Publication	Title
April 1967	Al-Adwaa (newspaper)	"دموع اليتيم" (“Orphan’s Tears”)
September 28, 1967	Al-Adwaa (newspaper)	"رحلة العمر" (“Trip of a Lifetime”)
September 28, 1967	Al-Adwaa (newspaper)	"الابتسامة لن تغيب" (“The Smile Will Not Be Lost”)
November 16, 1967	Al-Adwaa (newspaper)	"البقعة السوداء" (“Black Spot”)
July 18, 1968	Al-Adwaa (newspaper)	"عذاب لا ينتهي" (“Endless Torment”)
August 8, 1968	Al-Adwaa (newspaper)	"السجين" (“The Prisoner”)
September 5, 1968	Al-Adwaa (newspaper)	"ثرثرة خلف جدار الصمت" (“Gossip Behind a Wall of Silence”)
July 17, 1969	Al-Adwaa (newspaper)	"الشحات والغوص الجديد" (“Scarcity and New Diving”)
August 21, 1969	Al-Adwaa (newspaper)	"ذات ليلة من ليالي الأرق" (“One of the Sleepless Nights”)
September 25, 1969	Al-Adwaa (newspaper)	"ضياع في ليل الجواري" (“Lost Amid the Night Slaves”)
June 18, 1970	Al-Adwaa (newspaper)	"بداية الطريق" (“Start of the Road”)
1971	9 أصوات في القصة البحرينية الحديثة (“9 Voices in the Modern Bahraini Short Story,” Beirut: Arab Institute for Research & Publishing)	"سيرة الجوع والصمت" (“The Story of Hunger and Wisdom”)
October 26, 1971	Sada al-Usbu (newspaper)	"آه يا مرفأ الأمان" (“Oh, Safe Harbor”)
February 21, 1972	New Society (magazine)	"الوجه الذي تأكله الديدان" (“The Face Worms Eat”)
April 1974	''Al Bayan'' (magazine)	"الدخول في الدائرة" (“Entering the Circle”)
April 1975	Iraqi Pens (magazine): Issue 7	"خيط من الدم" (“Thread of Blood”)
September 1978	Hana Bahrain (magazine)	"ذكرى لم تنته" (“The Memory Is Not Over”)

== Direction ==
=== Radio series ===
- جري الوحوش (“Running Monsters”)
- ملاذ الطير (“Malath al-Tair)
- الوهم (“Illusion”)

=== TV series ===
Direction filmography
Title	Year
Wall of Memories (special)	1979
Rhelat El-Ajaayeb	1990
Another Girl	1993
My Ayawid File	1995
Hassan and Nour Al-Sana	1995
Tales of the Sea	1997
Jannoun Al Layl	2006
Sinbad bin Hareb	2010
Fairy Tales from the Gulf	2016
