= Zinj, Bahrain =

Zinj الزنج
- Village
- Trunk road in Zinj.

- Location in Bahrain
- Coordinates: 26°13′13″N 50°34′6″E
- Country: Bahrain
- Governorate: Capital Governorate

Zinj (Arabic: الزنج) is a suburb in the city of Manama, the capital of Bahrain.

== Etymology ==
The word Zinj eventually comes from Persian zang (زنگ [zæŋ]), meaning "black". The general belief amongst Bahraini scholars is that the reason why the suburb literally translates to "negros" or "blackamoors", is because it pertains to the African slaves who were sold there. Some foreign scholars disagree and claim that it is named after the Zanj Rebellion against the Abbasid caliphate in the 9th century.

== Geography ==
Hala Plaza complex in Zinj.

Zinj lies in the southern part of Manama and lies adjacent to the Shaikh Isa Bin Salman highway which eventually leads to the King Fahd Causeway to neighbouring Saudi Arabia. Zinj is included in the country's planned national light railway network.

The suburb is divided into two sections: New Zinj and Old Zinj. New Zinj consists of spacious villas, many overlooking the sea front and Tubli Bay. Old Zinj is an old section adjacent to the village of "Bilad Al Qadeem" (Arabic: بلاد القديم).

== History ==
Old Zinj houses many historical places such as Al-Saboor Mosque, one of the oldest mosques in Bahrain. Al Saboor Mosque is uniquely known to have no ceiling since all efforts to build one have failed.

In J. G. Lorimer's Gazetteer of the Persian Gulf, it is mentioned that 30 huts belonging to the Baharna are located in the village, and that cement is locally produced in 1908. His account also mentions extensive cultivation of well-irrigated date palms (estimated at 12,000) and farm animals.

Zinj is the home of several foreign embassies including those of the United States of America, Philippines, Indonesia, and Russia, while also being the previous location of the embassy of Pakistan. In April 2002, large pro-Palestinian demonstrations, numbering up to 20,000, were held in front of the American embassy, in which a Bahraini citizen was killed and around 100 injured after the American embassy was attacked with petrol bombs and stones. A similar protest was held in 2003, in the run-up to the Iraq War. Several roads in Zinj were barricaded with concrete blocks, and special security forces were frequently seen in the area at night during the 2000s.

== Economy ==
Galleria mall in Zinj

The area has undergone extensive commercial development in the 2010s alongside the neighbouring suburb of Seqaya, with the Galleria mall opening in 2015 in addition to other malls such as Hayat Mall, Tala Plaza and Hala Plaza. New Millennium School-DPS is a notable CBSE school in the area. Adhari Park, a popular amusement park, is situated in the area as is Al Jazira Supermarket and the Bahrain Writers Association.

== Sports ==
Al-Ahli Club and its stadium are located in Zinj. Al-Ahli Stadium holds League A and B football matches. Al-Ahli club is one of the oldest sports club in the country and region. The club is famous for winning various regional competitions in football, basketball, and volleyball. The club is also known for nurturing then star national football player Ala'a Hubail in the 2000s.
