= Fatima al-Taytun =

Bahraini poet (born 1962)

Fatima Ahmad al-Taytun (born 1962) is a Bahraini poet.

Al-Taytun was one of a generation of poets, many of whom have been found controversial by the government of Bahrain, that rose to prominence in the 1990s. She teaches Arabic in primary schools, and is a member of the Family of Writers and Authors. She has published numerous collections of poetry, beginning in 1991 with Arsum qalbi (I Draw My Heart); other works include al-Awqat al-mahura (The Desolate Times, 1994) and Tygys al-'ishq (The Rituals of Love, 1996).
