= John Verlenden =

American academic, writer and translator

John Verlenden is an American academic, writer and award-winning translator of Arabic literature. He obtained a BA in English literature from Rhodes College in 1986 followed by an MFA in Creative Writing from Louisiana State University in 1988. He has taught at a number of universities in the USA and the Middle East, and currently works at the American University in Cairo.

Verlenden and his AUC colleague Ferial Ghazoul have translated two works of Egyptian literature:

- Quartet of Joy, a book of poetry by Muhammad Afifi Matar (winner of the Arkansas Arabic Translation Award)
- Rama and the Dragon, a novel by Edwar al-Kharrat

He has also translated with Ghazoul poet Qassim Haddad's The Chronicles of Majnun Layla and Selected Poems. "I always think the wisdom and the beauty of antiquity deserve special places in any reader’s literary explorations," he said.

== See also ==
- List of Arabic-English translators
