= Amos Vogel =

American film critic (1921–2012)

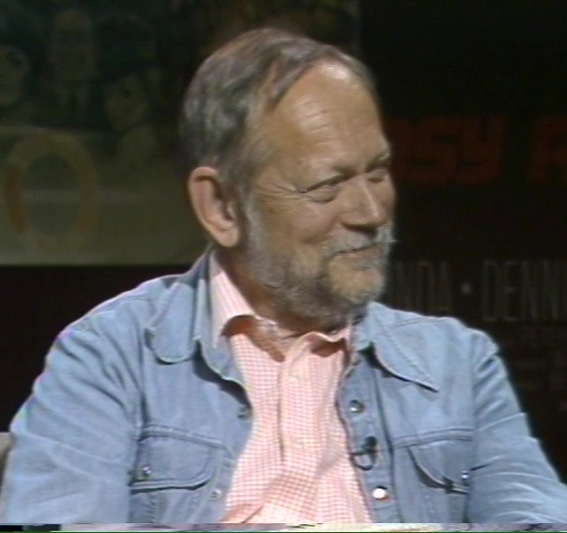
Vogel on CUNY TV's Cinema Then, Cinema Now (1987)

Amos Vogel (né Vogelbaum; April 18, 1921 – April 24, 2012) was a New York City cineaste and curator.

== Biography ==
Vogel was born in Vienna, Austria. He fled Austria with his parents after the Nazi Anschluß in 1938 and at first studied animal husbandry at the University of Georgia. In the American South, he noted, the racism was as bad as the anti-semitism he witnessed in Europe. Later he received a bachelor's degree from The New School for Social Research in New York.

He is best known for his bestselling book Film as a Subversive Art (1974) and as the founder of the New York City avantgarde ciné-club Cinema 16 (1947–1963), where he was the first programmer to present films by Roman Polanski, John Cassavetes, Nagisa Oshima, Jacques Rivette and Alain Resnais as well as early and important screenings by American avant-gardists of the time like Stan Brakhage, Maya Deren, James Broughton, Kenneth Anger, Sidney Peterson, Bruce Conner, Carmen D'Avino and many others.

In 1963, with Richard Roud, he co-founded the New York Film Festival, and served as its program director until 1968. In 1973, Vogel started the Annenberg Cinematheque at the University of Pennsylvania and was eventually given a Chair for film studies at the Annenberg School for Communication, where he taught and lectured for two decades. He wrote a children's book, How Little Lori Visited Times Square, published in 1963 with illustrations by Maurice Sendak.

Vogel participated in the documentary In the Mirror of Maya Deren (2003) by Martina Kudlácek. In 2014, a collection of his writings was published by the Austrian Film Museum. On the initiative of his sons, Steven and Loring, the private library of Amos Vogel has been transferred to the Austrian Film Museum. Since 2019, the Amos Vogel Library, a stock of more than 8,000 books, is available online. Both Columbia University and the Wisconsin Center for Film and Theater Research also hold material relating to Vogel and Cinema 16.

== Death ==
Vogel died aged 91, on April 24 2012 in New York City, of kidney failure.

== Work ==
- Film as a Subversive Art (1974)
- Be Sand, Not Oil: The Life and Work of Amos Vogel, FilmmuseumSynemaPublikationen Vol. 24, Vienna: SYNEMA - Gesellschaft für Film und Medien, 2014 (edited by Paul Cronin).

== Films about Vogel ==
- Film as a Subversive Art: Amos Vogel and Cinema 16, Paul Cronin, UK, 2003; 56m.
