= Theatre of Bahrain =

The theatre of Bahrain in its present form originated in the early 20th century, after the introduction of formal education in the country. Though shadow plays and puppet shows were previously widespread in Bahrain, European-style drama plays were first introduced in schools and plays written by Arab dramatists would be later included in the school curriculum.

As civil society became more interested in theatre and influenced by the likes of Tawfiq al-Hakim and Saadallah Wannous, Bahrain experienced a golden age by the 1970s of playwrights such as Ali Al Shargawi, Ebrahim Al-Arrayedh, Aqil Sawar and Yousef al-Hamdan. The country hosts three notable theatre companies: Awal Theatre, Al-Jazira Theatre and the Al-Sawari Theatre companies. In 2012, the 1001-seated National Theatre of Bahrain was opened.

== History ==
Archaeological excavation of sites dating back to the Dilmun civilisation of the Bronze Age in Bahrain have revealed the existence of a ritualistic polytheistic religion that was believed to contain elements of theatre. However, limited information is known about it. In the 7th century AD, Bahrain converted to Islam. Islam did not encourage human representation or drama; however, the events of Ashura inspired a form of dramatic expression called Ta'zieh (Arabic: تعزية). These dramatic re-enactments occur during the Islamic month of Muharram and commemorates the Battle of Karbala where the grandson of the Prophet Muhammed, Imam Hussain, and his companions were killed. Furthermore, there exists two related forms of drama in the Islamic world; Maqama and shadow plays.

Aside from this, other forms of performance art in Bahrain included puppet theatres and shadow plays, which were popular between the Middle Ages up to the 18th century. European drama plays were first brought to the Arab world as a result of the Napoleonic invasion of Egypt in 1798, eventually reaching the island nation of Bahrain.

=== 20th century ===
Drama in the Arab States of the Persian Gulf was pioneered by Kuwait and Bahrain in the early 20th century. The first recorded theatre production was A Judge from God's Will (Arabic: القاضي بأمر الله) which was performed in 1925 at the Hidaya Al-Khalifa Boys School in Muharraq. As a result of the formal education system in place in Bahrain, plays written by European playwrights, Arab and eventually Bahraini dramatists were staged by students and teachers in school. Religious, moralist and historical plays were primarily written by Syrian and Egyptian writers and performed at school. The earliest credited pioneers of Bahraini theatre were the two poets Ebrahim Al-Arrayedh and Abdulrahman Almoawda, whose plays in the 1950s were primarily based on historic figures and events in Islamic Arab history. Influenced by the likes of Egyptian playwright Ahmed Shawqi, both writers authored a combined ten plays, with Almoawda basing his plays on historical characters in Arab history such as Al-Ala'a Al-Hadrami.

In the 1940s, literary societies began expressing interest in amateur theatre, eventually culminating in the establishment of multiple theatre companies and a generation of Bahraini playwrights by the 1970s. In its formative years, Bahraini theatre placed a heavy emphasis on the translated works of English playwrights such as Shakespeare; however, as time progressed, it went on to espouse Arabic plays from Egypt and Syria. Eventually, a home-grown dramatic movement was born in the 1970s. Notable writers from this time include:

The Bahrain National Theatre.

- Ali Al Shargawi (born 1948), who primarily produced children's plays,.
- Aqil Sawar (born 1946), who was a realistic author and playwright of Al-Nawkhidha (1985) and Al Baraha (1990),
- Yousef al-Hamdan (born 1956) was an experimental dramatist and respected academic critic, who published his memoirs Al-Jathoum in 1990.
- Amin Salah (born 1949) was a novelist and later-turned dramatist who gained recognition after rewriting Romeo and Juliet, titled Romeo al-Fareeg in 1988. Other works were satire of current events such as Al-Jutah on capitalism.

Censorship was a common obstacle for playwrights; any content deemed politically motivated was subject to censorship by the Bahraini government, making it difficult to highlight seemingly apolitical social problems in plays.

=== 21st century ===
In November 2012, the 1,001-seated National Theatre of Bahrain was opened in Manama. Spanning an area of 11,869 square metres (127,760 sq ft), it is the third largest theatre in the Middle East.

== Companies ==
Traditionally, there have been three notable non-profit theatre companies operating in Bahrain. They receive subsidies from the Bahraini government.

=== Awal Theatre ===
Established in 1970, it is the oldest theatre company in the country and the first to be formed independent of any civil society or club. Headquartered in the city of Muharraq, its performances were mainly carried out in the nearby capital city, Manama. Relying on government subsidies, the Awal Theatre company promoted local playwright talents and actors. Its first play was Kursi Ateeq in 1970, an original play written by Mohammed Awad. Since then, the company had performed regional Arab as well as international plays

=== Al Jazira Theatre ===
Established in 1971 as an extension of the Al Jazira club and included former Awal Theatre members, its members were semi-professionals and frequently trained in the higher institutes of dramatic arts in Kuwait. Both Awal and Al Jazira theatre companies performed seasonally in Bahrain and toured in drama festivals across the Arab World.

=== Al Sawari Theatre ===
Founded by Abdullah al Sawari in 1991, the company primarily focuses on experimental theatre, adapting Asian elements of theatre such as Kathakali from India and Kabuki from Japan.
