= Ebrahim Al-Arrayedh =

Bahraini poet and writer (1908–2002)

Ibrahim Al-Arrayedh
- إبراهيم العريّض
- Portrait of Ebrahim al-Arrayedh
- Born: 8 March 1908; Bombay, British India
- Died: 28 May 2002 (aged 94)
- Occupation: Poet

Ebrahim Al-Arrayedh (Arabic: إبراهيم العريّض, 8 March 1908 – 28 May 2002) Ibrahim Al-Arrayedh was a celebrated Bahraini poet and writer, widely regarded as one of the most influential literary figures in Bahrain’s modern history. His work helped shape the country’s cultural identity and led the literary movement throughout the 20th century

== Biography ==
Born in Bombay, India , on 8 March 1908, Al-Arrayedh came from a diverse background—his father came from Manama, Bahrain, and his mother came from Iraq.

In 1922, at the age of 14, he visited Bahrain for the first time and began studying at the Hidaya al-Khalifa School, the island’s first formal educational institution. In 1926, he returned to Bombay, where he completed his high school education. During his studies, Al-Arrayedh developed an interest for languages and literature, including fluency Persian, English, and Urdu. His deep interest in Urdu literature led him to pursue further studies at Aligarh Muslim University

In 1927, he returned to Bahrain and began teaching English at the Hidaya al-Khalifa School, a role he held for four years. Later, he became deputy director of the Jafari School but resigned following disputes with British colonial authorities. He then moved to the State Customs Service as a treasurer.

In 1937, he became the head of a translation department in a Bahraini company—though the company ceased operation due to World War II.

In 1943, he moved to Delhi to work at a radio station before returning to Bahrain, where he joined the Bahrain Petroleum Company and remained until his retirement in 1967.

In 1974, he was appointed Ambassador-at-Large and later Ambassador Extraordinary and Plenipotentiary in the Ministry of Foreign Affairs.

=== Poetry and Literary Contributions ===
Al-Arrayedh began writing poetry at 18, and his first collection was published in Baghdad in 1931. Fluent in multiple languages, he translated poetry across Arabic, Persian, Urdu, and English, helping bridge literary traditions across cultures. His work resonated deeply in Iraq, Syria, and Egypt, earning him an invitation from the American University of Beirut to lecture on Arab literature

He was honored with “the Shaikh Isa bin Salman Al Khalifa Order – First Class” by the Bahraini government.

Among his most notable works:

• To Bethlehem– a book depicting the Palestinian struggle

• Bitter Bread – a book examining poverty and social injustice

• The Tragedy of Being – a book explore topics of human existence

His collection Poems of Bahrain offers a vivid portrayal of the nation’s cultural and social landscape.

Aside from writing, Al-Arrayedh was also a reformer and educator. He founded a school and was appointed head of the Constitutional Council by Sheikh Isa bin Salman Al-Khalifa, tasked with drafting Bahrain’s First Constitution in the early 1970s, ahead of its independence from the United Kingdom.

== Death ==
Al-Arrayedh died in May 2002 at the age of 94, following respiratory complications. He buried in Manama Graveyard beside his daughter, Layla Al-Arrayedh, who had died the previous year.

== Legacy ==
Following his death; in tribute to his contributions; King Hamad bin Isa Al-Khalifa named a major road opposite the Bahrain Financial Harbour after him. In 2006, his former residence in Gudaibiya, Manama, was transformed into the Ebrahim Al-Arrayedh Poetry House— a cultural center and gathering venue for poets and tourists alike.

In 2008, UNESCO honored his legacy with an exhibition at its headquarters in Paris, celebrating his impact on literature and culture.
