= International Poetry Festival of Medellín =

Annual festival held in Medellín, Colombia

The International Poetry Festival of Medellín (Spanish:Festival Internacional de Poesía de Medellín) is an annual festival held in Medellín, the second-largest city of Colombia. It was founded in 1991.

== Background and history ==
Medellín has a reputation for violence, and from its beginning in 1991, the festival has attempted to offer an alternative.

In 2011 the World Poetry Movement was founded in the context of the World Gathering of Directors from 37 International Poetry Festivals, held in Medellín.

== Recognition and awards ==
In 2006 the festival was one of the recipients of the Right Livelihood Award. The citation for the award explained that it was given "…for showing how creativity, beauty, free expression and community can flourish amongst and overcome even deeply entrenched fear and violence."

The festival has also won a Spanish literary award for its contribution to peace among other things.

== Appearances by poets ==
In 2015, Indigenous Australian poet Samuel Wagan Watson represented Australia at the festival.
