= Daria Serenko =

Russian feminist

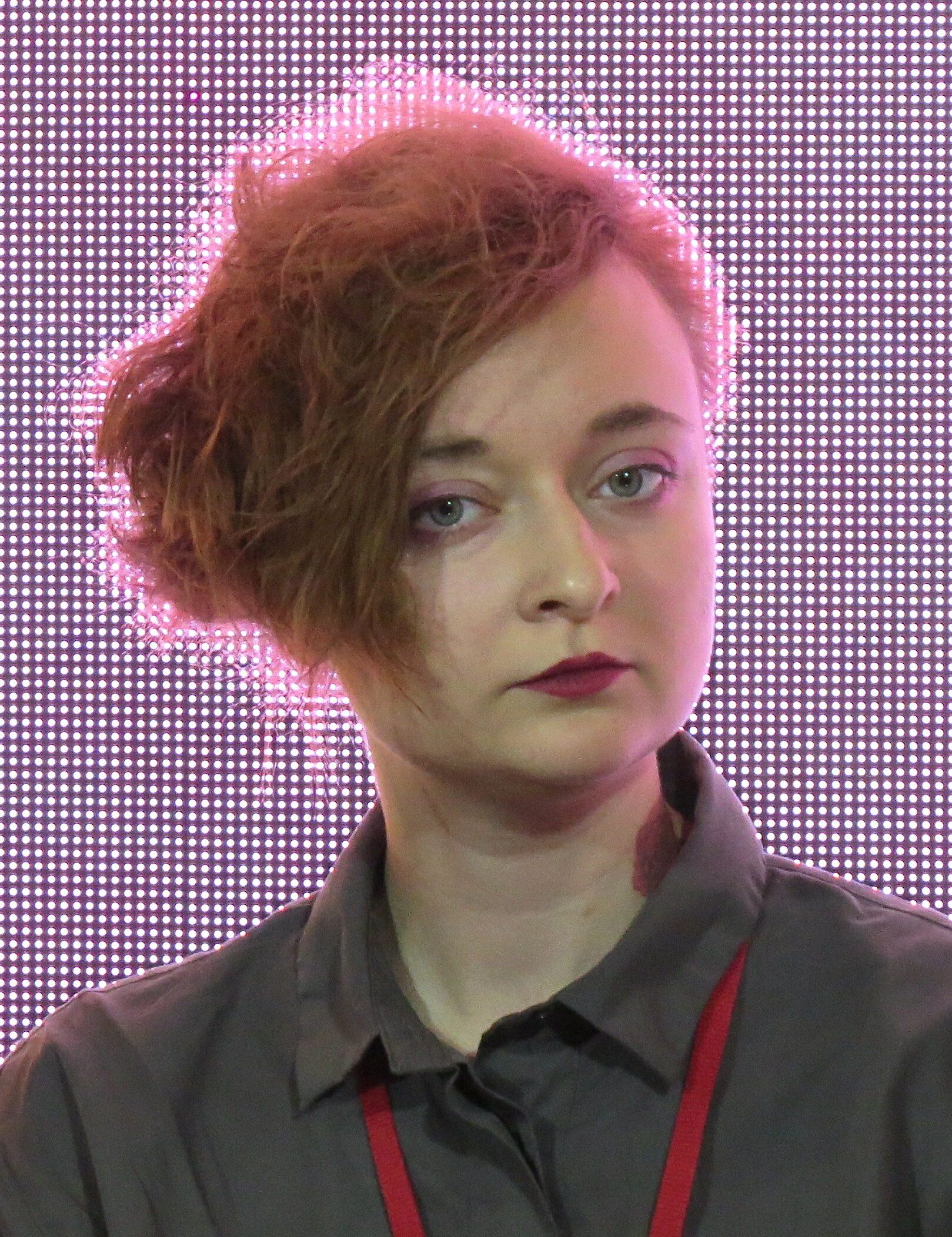
- Serenko at the 2019 Moscow International Book Fair
- Born: 23 January 1993 (age 33); Khabarovsk
- Education: Maxim Gorky Literature Institute
- Occupations: Poet; curator; artist; activist
- Writing career
- Notable awards: 100 Women 2023

Daria Andreyevna Serenko (Russian: Да́рья Андре́евна Сере́нко; born 23 January 1993) is a Russian feminist activist, poet, curator and public artist.

== Biography ==
Serenko was born on 23 January 1993 in Khabarovsk. She studied at the Maxim Gorky Literature Institute. She lived in Moscow, where she worked as a curator at the Municipal Library in Moscow. She said that her and her colleagues frequently criticized the government and held covert feminist and LGBT events until 2019, when the government intensified censorship efforts, after which she resigned from her position as the head of a gallery.

== Activism ==
Serenko took part in the 2015–16 anti-militarist travelling art exhibition Ne Mir (No Peace). In her collaborative 2016 project Tikhii Picket (Silent Picket), participants created an A3 political poster and recorded reactions. Serenko herself permanently travelled with her Silent Picket poster, "three months under the supervision of a poster", and as a result was "constantly communicating with people, fifteen or twenty hours a day". One sign depicted a girl with her head in her arms inundated by sort of the comments received if a woman alleges rape ("She was probably drunk", "What was she wearing?"). Serenko said: "Men, as always, laughed." In 2016, Serenko also curated a Moscow exhibition of Stuckist art.

In 2020, Serenko was one of the cofounders of Femdacha, a feminist retreat on the outskirts of Moscow.

On Valentine's Day 2021, Serenko organized a "chain of solidarity" for female victims of political repression. After announcing the event on Facebook, she received an estimated 600 death threats. That year, she worked for the campaign of human rights activist Alyona Popova, a candidate for the State Duma. In November 2021, Serenko published a Facebook post underlining that migrants were only responsible for 3–4% of crimes in Russia. Soon afterwards, she discovered that her phone number and a home address had been leaked to far-right activists. The founder of the Male State movement urged his followers to "crush" the "scum", and Serenko received thousands more death threats.

On 8 February 2022, Serenko was sentenced by Moscow's Tverskoy District Court to 15 days in jail for a September 2021 Instagram post advocating tactical voting. The post contained campaign symbols for the Smart Voting campaign of Alexei Navalny's' Anti-Corruption Foundation (FBK), proscribed in June 2021 as an "extremist organisation". She was prosecuted under Part 1 of the Code of the Russian Federation on Administrative Offenses, which criminalizes the symbols and paraphernalia of groups that the Russian government defines as "extremist organisations".

Since the 2022 Russian invasion of Ukraine, Serenko has participated in the activist group Feminist Anti-War Resistance, which on 27 February issued a manifesto calling on Russian feminists to oppose the war. Serenko herself published a statement calling on Russians to put aside political apathy and act:

Stop being pathetic cowards, conformists, patient sufferers, loyal citizens, stop being apolitical ...Stop sitting in cafes. Stop planning vacations. Stop listening to propaganda. Don't die like fools. Stop being scared of prison and arrests, I swear to God, those are not the worst options. Join antiwar activists and movements. Protest this war."

In March 2022, Serenko was among 151 international feminists signing Feminist Resistance Against War: A Manifesto, in solidarity with the Feminist Anti-War Resistance.

In November 2023, the BBC named Serenko in their 100 Women list of "inspiring and influential women from around the world", recognizing Serenko for her feminist and anti-war activism, art and writing.

On 27 January 2023, the Russia's Ministry of Justice added Serenko to its list of "foreign agents". The government also issued an arrest warrant for Serenko in April 2024, though no criminal cases had been opened against her as of that time. She currently resides in Georgia, where she fled after the Russian invasion of Ukraine.

== Works ==
=== Poetry ===
- Siberia Burns: A Poem from Russia. Los Angeles Review of Books, 12 August 2021. Translated by Rachel Brazier, Serena Clapp-Clark, Paige MacKinnon, Helen Poe and Elizabeth Tolley.
- Contributor to Galina Rymbu et al. (eds), F Letter: New Russian Feminist Poetry. ISOLARII, 2020
