= Leonid Georgievsky =

Russian author and political activist

Leonid Georgievsky (formerly Elena Nikolayevna Georgievskaya, Russian: Елена Николаевна Георгиевская; b. June 9, 1980 in Yaroslavl Oblast, USSR) is a Russian author and political activist. Georgievsky is a transgender person and uses "he/him" pronouns. He changed the gender marker on passport in 2023.

He graduated from the Maxim Gorky Literature Institute in 2006. He also studied at the Herzen University (1999–2000) and at the Faculty of Philosophy of the Saint Petersburg State University (2000–2001). He is a member of the Union of Russian Writers (since 2012).

He was longlisted for the Debut Prize (2006, 2013, 2015). He is a recipient of a Khavinson Grant (2006). He is a recipient of the 2010 Fellowship of the Ministry of Culture. He lives in Kaliningrad and Moscow.

Georgievsky was published in the F Letter anthology under the name Elena Georgievskaya, served as one of the editors of the F-Pismo project, and co-edited — alongside Anna Golubkova and Yulia Podlubnova — «Сетка Цеткин» (Zetkin's Net), Russian first anthology of feminist criticism.

He is the author of books including «Вода и ветер» (Вагриус, 2009, ISBN 978-5-9697-0769-6), «Хаим Мендл» (Franc-tireur USA, 2011), «Книга 0» (Franc-tireur USA, 2012), «Сталелитейные осы» (Вивернариум, 2017, ISBN 5446514696, ISBN 9785446514694), «Онейросеть» (Literature Without Borders, 2025). Olga Slavnikova praised his early novel «Место для шага вперёд».
