= F Letter: New Russian Feminist Poetry =

Poetry anthology

- Author: Galina Rymbu, Eugene Ostashevsky, and Ainsley Morse
- Language: Russian, English
- Genre: Poetry anthology
- Published: October 2020
- Publisher: isolarii
- Media type: Print and Online
- ISBN: 978-1-7350750-1-3

F Letter: New Russian Feminist Poetry is a collection of contemporary poetry edited by Galina Rymbu, Eugene Ostashevsky, and Ainsley Morse. It was the first anthology of feminist poetry from Russia in any language. Rymbu, in the introduction to the book, writes that F Letter is “a secret burrow, an island of freedom.” The works are published in both English and Russian, with a foreword by poet Eileen Myles and philosopher Amia Srinivasan.

Poets in the anthology include Galina Rymbu, Lida Yusupova, Egana Djabbarova, Daria Serenko, Lolita Agamalova, Oksana Vasyakina, Stanislava Mogileva, Nastya Denisova, Elena Georgievskaya, and Ekaterina Simonova. The title of the book comes from the Russian-language journal ф письмо (F pismo), which has published LGBTQ+ and feminist poetry since 2017 and was founded by Galina Rymbu.
