= Alexander Mezhirov =

Russian writer (1923–2009)

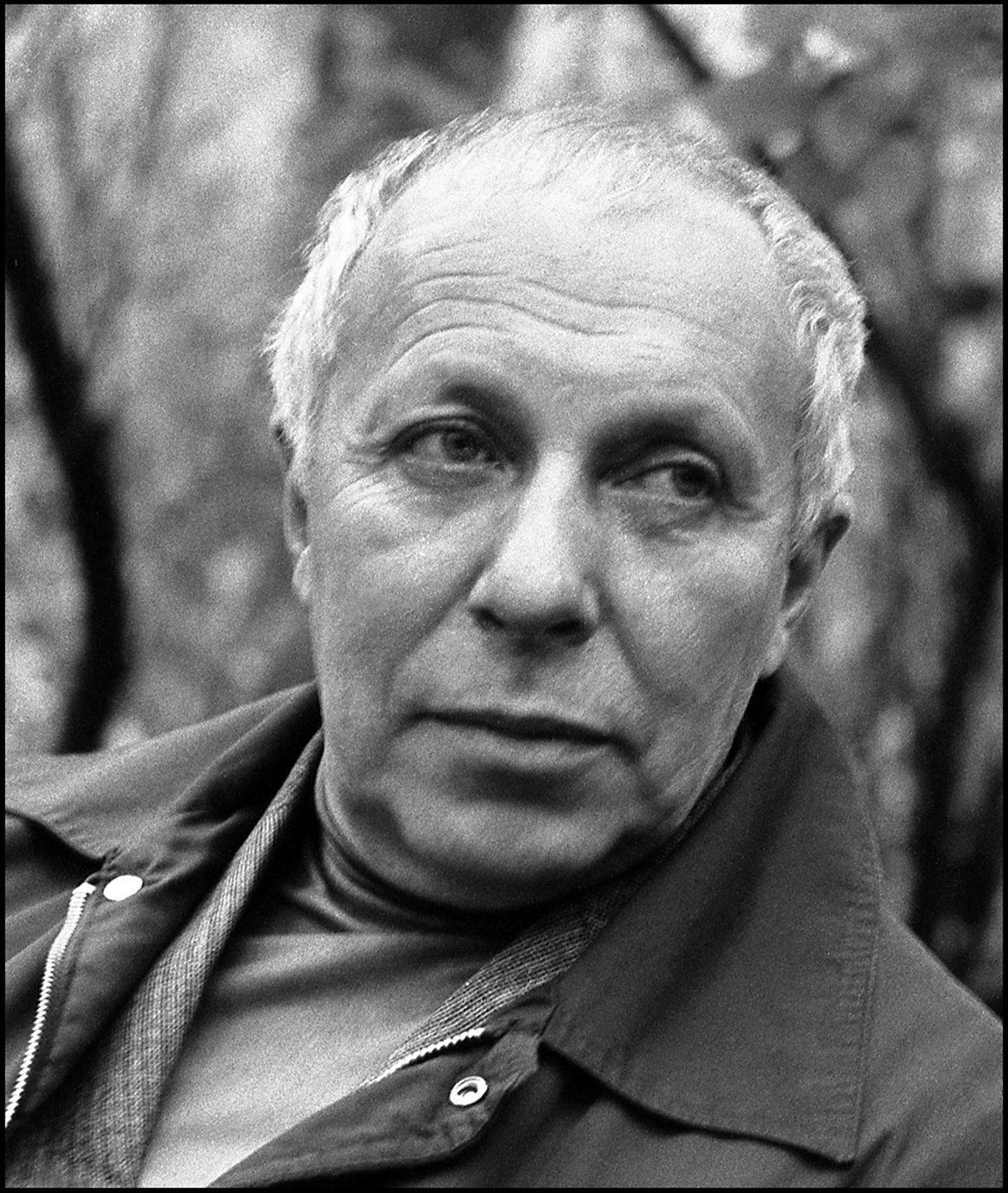
Alexander Mezhirov 1980

Alexander Petrovich Mezhirov (Russian: Александр Петрович Межиров; 26 September 1923, Moscow – 22 May 2009, New York City) was a Soviet and Russian poet, translator and critic.

Mezhirov was among what has been called a "middle generation" of Soviet poets that ignored themes of communist "world revolution" and instead focused on Soviet and Russian patriotism. Many of them specialized in patriotic lyrics, particularly its military aspects. According to G. S. Smith, Mezhirov and a number of other "middle generation" poets "were genuine poets whose testimony, however well-laundered, to the tribulations of their times will endure at least as long as their generation." Some of Mezhirov's lyrical poems based on his wartime experience belong with the best Russian poetical works created in the Soviet 1950s-1960s.

== Life ==
Born in Moscow, he was the son of an educated Jewish couple — his father a lawyer, his mother a German-language teacher, and one of his grandfathers was a rabbi. Drafted as a private in July 1941, he fought in World War II before a serious injury led to his demobilization in 1943 as a lieutenant. That same year, he joined the Communist Party; after the war he attended the Literary Institute, graduating in 1948. He translated poetry from Georgian and Lithuanian poets. "Mezhirov is a virtuosic translator, especially recognized for his renditions of Georgian and Lithuanian poetry," anthologist Maxim Shrayer has written. In 1944, he married Elena Yashchenko. The couple's daughter, Zoya Velikhova, was born in 1949 and became a writer.

Mezhirov was a prominent figure in the Soviet literary establishment, although his allegiances and associations were varied. At some points he was close to fellow Jewish-Russian Boris Yampolsky, Kazakh writer Olzhas Suleimenov, and Russian cultural ultranationalist and critic Vadim Kozhinov. Mezhirov associated with younger writers Yevgeny Yevtushenko, Tatyana Glushkova (known for her nationalist views in the mid-1980s, according to Shrayer) and Evgeny Reyn, who was censored in the Soviet Union until the mid-1980s.

Although Mezhirov had publicly stated that his patriotism for Russia was so intense that, unlike other Russian Jews, he could not emigrate, he suddenly left Russia for the United States in 1992, settling first in New York, then in Portland, Oregon. As of 2007, according to anthologist Maxim D. Shrayer, he had not revisited Russia. In March 2009 Mezhirov published a collection of new poems, two months before his death. According to the ITAR/TASS news service, his body was to be cremated in the United States, with the ashes to be buried in Peredelkino near Moscow.

At one time the poet was a passionate pool player and was a friend of professional billiards players. He excelled in other games, as well.

== Critical reception ==
Mezhirov has a "special gift" for absorbing the voices of his contemporaries and his predecessors from the 1900s–1930s, according to Shrayer, who notes the influences in Mezhirov's writing of Eduard Bagritsky, Erich Maria Remarque, Anna Akhmatova, Alexander Blok, Vladislav Khodasevich, Mikhail Kuzmin, Vladimir Lugovskoy, David Samoylov and Arseny Tarkovsky.

== Variations in Mezhirov's name and birth year ==
Mezhirov has given his birth year as 1921, but a number of sources have instead given it as 1923.

The poet's first name sometimes rendered "Aleksandr" or "Alexandr" in sources using the Latin alphabet.

== Bibliography ==
Each year links to the corresponding "[year] in poetry" article. Unless otherwise sourced below, translations of the Russian-language titles of the following books were taken from Google Translate and may be overly literal:

- 1947: Дорога далеко ("The Road is Far Away"), edited by Pavel Antokolsky, Moscow
- 1948: Kommunisty, vpered!, "Communists, Ahead!" poem reprinted in his second collection, New Encounters, and in many volumes, anthologies and samplers
- 1949: Новые встречи ("New Encounters"), including "Communists, Ahead!"
- 1950: Коммунисты, вперёд! ("Communists, Ahead!"), reprinted 1952
- 1955: Возвращение ("Return")
- 1961: Ветровое стекло ("Windshield")
- 1964: Прощание со снегом ("Farewell to the Snow")
- 1965: Ладожский лёд ("Ice of Lake Ladoga")
- 1967: Подкова ("Horseshoe")
- 1968: Лебяжий переулок ("Swan's Lane")
- 1976: Под старым небом ("Under the Old Sky")
- 1977: Очертания вещей ("Outline of things")
- 1981: Selected Works, two volumes
- 1982: Проза в стихах ("Prose in Verse") (winner of the USSR State Prize, 1986)
- 1984: Тысяча мелочей ("A thousand small things")
- 1989: Бормотуха ("Bormotuha")
- 1989: Стихотворения ("Poems")
- 1991: Избранное ("Favorites")
- 1997: Позёмка ("Drifting")
- 1997: Apologii︠a︡ t︠s︡irka: kniga novykh stikhov ("Apologia of the Circus"), including a version of "Blizzard", St. Petersburg
- 2006: Артиллерия бьёт по своим, selected poems of recent years), Moscow: publisher: Zebra E
