= Sofia Kosacheva =

Russian forest firefighter

Sofia Kosacheva is a Russian forest firefighter. She founded a professional community dedicated to training volunteer firefighters to deal with large forest fires. In 2023, she was named as one of the BBC's 100 Women of the year. She and activist Daria Serenko are the only two Russians to appear on the BBC's 2023 list.

Throughout her career as a firefighter, she has helped to stop hundreds of fires. She also collaborated with Greenpeace, until the Kremlin labeled it as an "undesirable organization", and its Russian branch was dismantled. Before she worked as a forest firefighter, she was an opera teacher. In 2010, meeting a group of firefighters inspired her to quit her job and train as a firefighter.
