= Lucky Breaks =

2018 short story collection by Yevgenia Belorusets

Lucky Breaks (Щасливі падіння) is a 2018 short story collection by Ukrainian writer and photographer Yevgenia Belorusets. The book depicts the lives of women whose everyday routines are disrupted by the war in eastern Ukraine. In 2022, it was translated from Russian into English by Eugene Ostashevsky, and published by Pushkin Press.

== Reception ==
In a review for The Guardian, Marcel Theroux praised "these stories, the sharpness and clarity of their observations, their dark humour, and the glimpses they give of an unfamiliar world". However, he felt that some parts of the book had become outdated due to the 2022 Russian invasion of Ukraine. The Straits Times gave the book a four star rating, calling it a "haunting, evocative collection". A review in the Los Angeles Review of Books noted how the book depicted gender-based violence as commonplace and noramlised.

== Awards ==
The English version of the book was shortlisted for the Oxford–Weidenfeld Translation Prize in 2023. The German translation of the book won the International Literature Award in 2020.
