= Modern Animal =

2021 book by Yevgenia Belorusets

- First edition
- Author: Yevgenia Belorusets
- Language: English
- Genre: Fiction
- Publisher: Isolarii
- Publication date: 15 July 2021
- ISBN: 978-1-7350750-5-1

Modern Animal is a 2021 novel by Yevgenia Belorusets. Belorusets connects a series of different characters and ideas, making use of a Soviet-style lecture form. While writing the novel, Belorusets interviewed people along the Donbas region, approaching the Russian-Ukrainian conflict through stories about animals. ISOLARII co-founder Sebastian Clark described the work “as a great refutation of autofiction.” The book was published with a foreword by filmmaker Peter Greenaway. Writing for magCulture, Danielle Mustarde notes how over the course of the novel the "once-structured Modern Animal evolves into a dream-like mix of interview, folklore and fiction."
