= Leslie Lee (playwright) =

American playwright

- Born: 1930; West Conshohocken, Pennsylvania, U.S.
- Died: January 20, 2014 (aged 83–84)
- Education: University of Pennsylvania; Villanova University
- Occupations: Playwright, director, professor
- Notable work: First Breeze of Summer; Colored People's Time

Leslie Lee (1930 – January 20, 2014) was an American playwright, director and professor of playwriting and screenwriting.

== Life and work ==
Leslie Lee grew up in West Conshohocken, Pennsylvania. He earned a bachelor's degree from the University of Pennsylvania and a master's degree from Villanova University.

Lee's early theatre experience was at Ellen Stewart's La Mama Experimental Theatre Club in the East Village, Manhattan. His play Elegy for a Down Queen was produced at La MaMa in 1970 and in 1972 by John Vaccaro's Playhouse of the Ridiculous. Cops and Robbers was produced at La MaMa in 1971 by La MaMa GPA Nucleus Company. 1997, marked the beginning of Mr. Lee's theatre collaboration (spanning twenty years) with his Dramatic Writing Student from New York University's Tisch School of the Arts whom he deemed his protégé, Sophia Romma (née Murashkovsky). Colonel Lee directed Sophia Murashkovsky's play, Love, In the Eyes of Hope, Dies Last which was produced at La MaMa in 1997, and he also directed Sophia Murashkovsky's critically acclaimed play, Coyote Take Me There! at La MaMa in 1999. In 2004, Leslie Lee directed Ms. Murashkovsky's epic, mystic play, Defenses of Prague at La MaMa. Mr. Lee continued to successfully collaborate in the theatre with Dr. Sophia Romma and in 2006, directed her heart-wrenching émigré saga, Shoot Them In the Cornfields! which premiered at the American Theatre of Actors. Mr. Lee, who seldom took on the role of director, believed that Dr. Romma's unique staccato lyrical voice, her poignant themes of advocating for multicultural tolerance, religious, ethnic and minority acceptance, and most importantly her stark depictions of the trials and tribulations of immigration/assimilation were well worth exploring on the theatrical stage. Ms. Murashkovsky (Romma) in turn, directed Mr. Lee's short play, We're Not Here to Talk About Beethoven at John McTiernan's New York Performance Works.

Lee also worked with the Negro Ensemble Company along with Sophia Romma https://www.broadwayworld.com/people/Sophia-Romma/ who served as Literary Manager of NEC.

His significant work includes his history play Colored People's Time, a production of which featured Angela Bassett and Samuel L. Jackson, and Hannah Davis. He received a 1975 Obie Award for Best Play, a 1976 Tony Award nomination for Best Play, and an Outer Circle Critics Award for his play First Breeze of Summer. In 2006, the Negro Ensemble Company produced his play Sundown Names and Night Gone Things, based on Richard Wright's life in 1930s Chicago, featuring Stephen Tyrone Williams and Dewanda Wise. In 2008, the Signature Theatre Company produced a revival of First Breeze of Summer, directed by Ruben Santiago-Hudson and starring Leslie Uggams, Brandon J. Dirden and Jason Dirden, and Yaya DaCosta.

Lee's film credits include Almos' A Man, an adaptation starring LeVar Burton of a Richard Wright story; The Killing Floor, which won first prize at the National Black Film Consortium; and an adaptation (with Gus Edwards) of James Baldwin's novel Go Tell It On The Mountain, starring Paul Winfield and Rosalind Cash.

== Teaching and grants ==
Lee taught playwriting at the College of Old Westbury on Long Island, New York University's Tisch School of the Arts, The New School's Eugene Lang College of Liberal Arts, and the Frederick Douglass Creative Arts Center in Manhattan, where he and Sophia Romma taught playwriting and screenwriting workshops under the leadership of Ray Gaspard, Kermit Frazier, and Marc Henry Johnson. He was a playwright-in-residence at the University of Pennsylvania, and received grants from the Shubert Foundation, the Rockefeller Foundation, and the National Foundation of the Arts.

He received a playwriting fellowship from the Eugene O'Neill Theater Center in Connecticut.

In 2009, he was sponsored by a Likhachev Foundation grant to travel to Russia and complete a screenplay on Alexander Pushkin.

== Death and legacy ==
Lee died on January 20, 2014, due to complications of heart failure. He is survived by a brother and sisters, and several nieces and nephews.

The Negro Ensemble Company and Signature Theatre Company held a memorial celebration of his life and work in March 2014.
