= Masha, or the Fourth Reich =

2013 novel by Jaroslav Melnik

- First edition (Lithuanian)
- Author: Jaroslav Melnik
- Original title: Maša, arba Postfašizmas
- Language: Lithuanian
- Genre: Dystopian novel
- Publisher: Alma littera
- Publication date: 2013
- Publication place: Lithuania
- Media type: Print (Hardback)
- Pages: 248 pp
- ISBN: 9786090111963

Masha, or the Fourth Reich is a dystopian novel by Lithuanian/Ukrainian author Jaroslav Melnik. Published in 2013 in Lithuanian (as ‘Maša, arba Postfašizmas’) by the largest publishing house company group in the Baltic states Alma littera, it was shortlisted for the Book of the Year Awards. 18 reviews have been published about this novel. Critics call this thriller ‘a shocking book that can be a bestseller in Western countries’. ‘In this book the author fulfilled Hitler's dream’. In 2016 the novel was published in Ukraine and became a bestseller (BBC Book of the Year Award shortlist) . In 2020, the novel was published in France by Actes Sud.

== Plot introduction ==
Hitler dreamed of a Reich. If the National Socialists had realized their dream, what would the "post-fascist" society look a thousand years later? After all, already in the 20th century the inmates of Auschwitz had lost their human status and were debased to the level of animals, their body parts used to fulfill the consumer needs of the 'higher race'. The result? In a thousand years the inferior race has transformed into human-like animals called stors.

At the start of this story, the main character is a journalist of an official newspaper; later he gradually joins with a group who can no longer abide the horrifying legacy of the past. Little by little his conscience awakes. The plot revolves around the main character and what happens when he falls in love with a she-stor Masha.

== Reception ==
“Masha, or the Fourth Reich” – a novel which overwhelms and makes one become more sensitive. Openly written and at the same time sharp this story will leave thousands of thoughts in one's head and will raise the consciousness in every reader" (Planet News, review).

“A powerful dystopian fable, by the Ukrainian Jaroslav Melnik, which collides the animal question with the worst totalitarian constructions that humanity has been able to raise against itself: if the "lower race" is absolutely dehumanized, all moral questions vanish" (Libération).

"Borrowing the theme of sub-men from H. G. Wells, Melnik mixes, as a knowledgeable DJ, philosophical reflection, post-historical essay, anticipation novel and denunciation of Nazism in a novel as chilling as it is astonishing." (L'Obs - Le Nouvel Observateur).

“To be or to appear ... a human being" "Constructed skillfully, beautifully presented with a Gothic model that imbues the object with a chilling aura "

"Beyond the noir novel and the philosophical message, an era outside of time - but not so distant when we get closer to the outcome - is a meditation on the idea we have of life, of what we want - or must - do with it, and courageous decisions to be made at the many crossroads of our existence. A lesson in modesty” (L'Internaute (Figaro website)

"This novel of anticipation is to be put in all hands" "A total success! " (The Suricate Magazine))

"A book as disturbing as it is clever, one of which we will still spend time mentally traversing the dark twists and turns once the object is closed. Not to mention this final twist, a tremendous find, which alone gives a disturbing depth to this story of crazy inventiveness. " (Usbek & Rica Magazine)

== See also ==
- Mein Kampf
