= Oleg Khafizov =

Russian writer

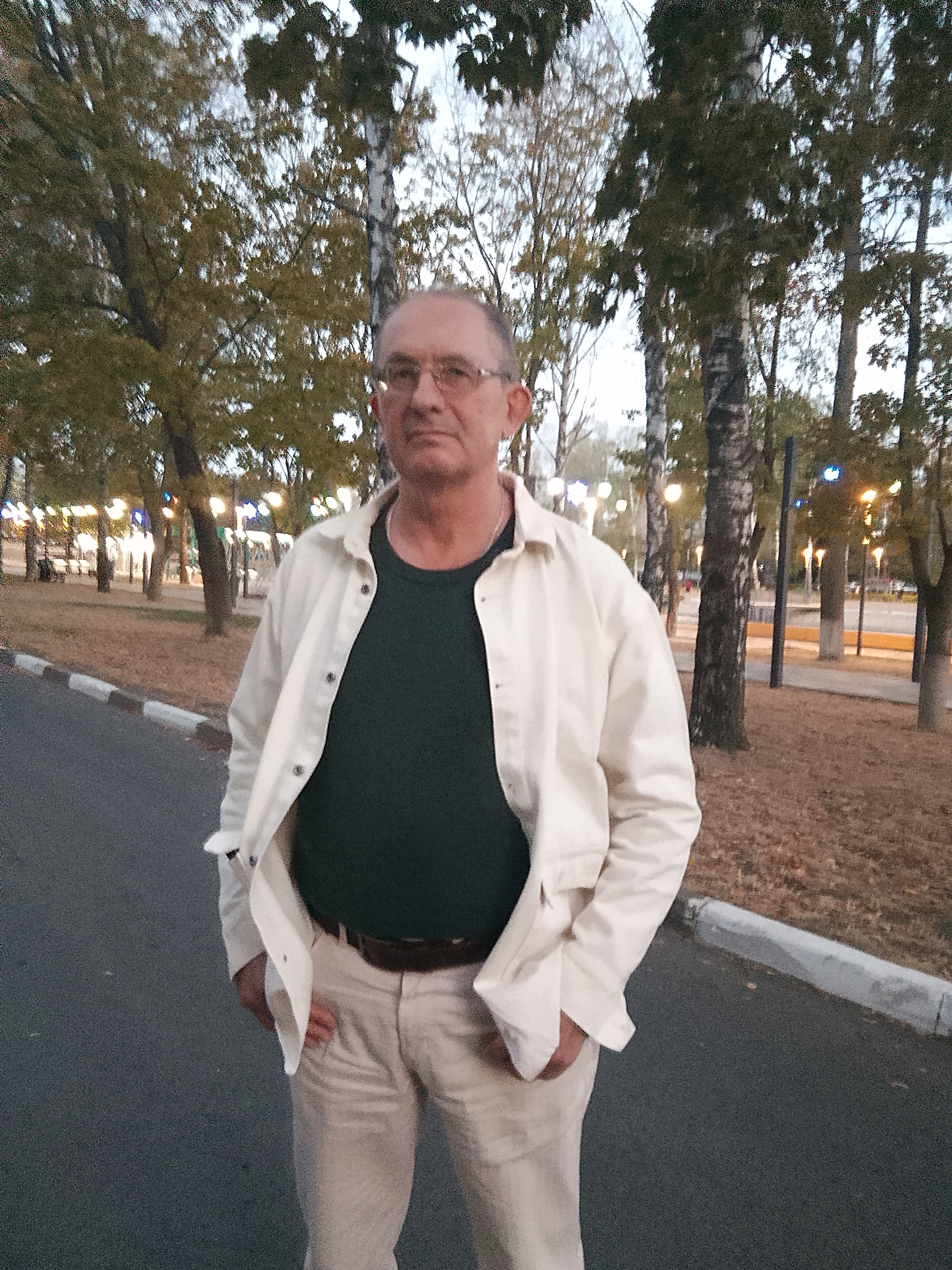
- Born: March 13, 1959; Sverdlovsk, USSR
- Occupation: Writer
- Writing career
- Period: 1980s - present

Oleg Esgatovich Khafizov (Russian: Олег Эсгатович Хафизов; born 13 of March 1959 in Sverdlovsk), is a Russian writer.

He was born in the family of factory employees. From the age of three lives in Tula. As a pupil of a suburban high school he was closely interested in history, rock music and arts, learned music and painting, practiced boxing and martial arts. Under the influence of Russian classics and contemporary European, mainly Anglo-American, literature commenced prose-writing at the age of 24.

After having graduated from high school, Khafizov worked as a commercial designer at a factory and later joined the faculty of foreign languages of Tula Pedagogic Institute. He studied extramural working as an interpreter at scientific and research institutions. From launching the Perestroyka policy in the Soviet Union, Khafizov turned to advertising business and started a course at Maxim Gorky Literature Institute. In the 90s and early 2000s he mastered jobs of a regional journalist, anchorman, editor and script writer on TV. Nowadays Khafizov teaches journalism and writes free-lance.

First Khafizov's considerable published works of prose in Volga magazine dated to the early 90s. Although the writer had been hardly working on prose and plays, it took him about ten years to be published in major Moscow literary magazines. The works of Khafizov were issued in «Novy Mir», «Znamya», «Oktyabr'», «Druzhba narodov», «Vestnik Evropy» and numerous literary periodicals in Russia, United States, Great Britain, Germany and Denmark. One of them, «The Flight of "Russia"» («Polyot "Rossii"») was claimed among the five best long stories written in the Russian language in 2004 after prestigious Ivan Belkin literary contest.

According to critics, later prose of Khafizov is kin to that of Sergey Dovlatov and Henry Miller. In the opinion of a participant of legendary «Metropolis» almanac Yevgeny Popov, Oleg Khafizov ranks as «one of the best writers of Russia».

Oleg Khafizov is the author of four books of prose based on contemporary and historic subjects.
