= The Killing Floor (1984 film) =

1984 film by Bill Duke

- Written by: Leslie Lee
- Story by: Elsa Rassbach
- Directed by: Bill Duke
- Starring: Damien Leake; Alfre Woodard; Ernest Rayford; Moses Gunn; Clarence Felder
- Music by: Elizabeth Swados
- Country of origin: United States
- Original language: English

Production
- Executive producer: Elsa Rassbach
- Producer: George Manasse
- Cinematography: William Birch
- Editor: John Carter
- Running time: 118 minutes
- Production company: Public Forum Productions

Original release
- Network: PBS
- Release: April 10, 1984

The Killing Floor is a 1984 American made-for-television drama film directed by Bill Duke which highlights the plights of workers fighting to build an interracial labor union in the meatpacking industry in the years leading up to the Chicago race riot of 1919. The film debuted on PBS via the American Playhouse series on April 10, 1984 and was produced by Public Forum Productions, an independent company founded by the film's writer Elsa Rassbach. The teleplay was later adapted by Leslie Lee. In July 2021, the film was shown in the Cannes Classics section at the 2021 Cannes Film Festival.

== Plot ==
Based on real individuals and actual events, the film focuses on two poor black sharecroppers who leave Mississippi for the Chicago stockyards to seek out employment opportunities vacated by soldiers who had departed for World War I. Frank Custer and Thomas Joshua eventually secure jobs working in the infamous meatpacking industry, where they are forced to confront racism, labor disputes, layoffs, and union organizing.

Custer, the film’s main protagonist, is eventually persuaded by his fellow workers to join the Amalgamated Meat Cutters & Butcher Workmen of North America Union, pitting him against a variety of forces, including his non-union black co-workers, as well as the Polish, Irish, Lithuanian, and Germans also living and working in the area.

The film focuses on many individuals who were responsible for leading the charge to build strong, interracial labor unions in the 1910s.

== Cast ==
- Damien Leake as Frank Custer
- Alfre Woodard as Mattie, Custer's wife
- Dennis Farina as Supervisor, killing floor supervisor
- Ernest Rayford as Thomas Joshua
- Moses Gunn as Heavy Williams, anti-union antagonist
- Clarence Felder as Bremer, union leader
- John Mahoney as Thomas Condon, meatpacking company representative

== Production ==
Rassbach did extensive research on Chicago's history while writing the story, and hired Lee to draft a manuscript. The total budget for the film was $1.2 million, and funding was culled from a variety of unorthodox sources. Given the film's focus on Chicago's labor history, Rassbach approached more than three dozen unions for support, eliciting donations ranging from $1,000 to $300,000. The film's end credits include a long list of guilds and locals who contributed.

Filmed in Chicago, the production was made at a challenging time for unions, after Ronald Reagan had fired over 11,000 striking members of the Professional Air Traffic Controllers Organization in 1981. Conversely, Chicago had recently elected their first African American mayor, Harold Washington, whose campaign helped recruit numerous black extras to appear in the film. In addition, the local Teamsters were said to believe in the film's objective, and worked for half-pay during production.

== Reception ==
The film was selected for the International Critics Week (Semaine de la critique) at the Cannes Film Festival in 1985, and winner of the Sundance Film Festival's Special Jury Prize in that same year.

== Release ==
Originally, the film was set to be the initial production for a PBS series of ten historical docu-dramas exploring the little-known history of American workers. Rassbach developed the project together with a cohort of historians and screenwriters, though The Killing Floor was the only film ever made in the series. To recognize the 100th anniversary of the Chicago race riots in 2019, the film underwent 4K DCP digital restoration by the University of California-Los Angeles Film & Television Archive.
