= Antonina Koptiaeva =

Antonina Dmitriyevna Koptiaeva (Russian: Антонина Дмитриевна Коптяева; 7 November 1909 – 12 November 1991) was a Soviet and Russian writer. Her novels concern the personal and professional lives of women in the Soviet Union.

== Biography ==
Koptiaeva was born in Iuzhnyi in eastern Siberia. She and her husband Karl Yanovich Zeite, a mining official, moved to Kolyma in 1932, where she began writing in 1935.

Her first novel, Kolymskoe zoloto ("Kolyma Gold", 1936), was published under her married name A. Zeite. She also published a collection of essays, The Tale of Aldan, in 1937. Zeite was arrested in 1938 and died in prison. Both of their daughters also died in the 1930s. She later married author Fyodor Panfyorov (1896–1960).

Her book Fart ("Lucky Break", 1940) was a socialist realist novel about Siberian gold mining, which was followed by Tovarishch Anna ("Comrade Anna", 1946), about a disintegrating marriage. She graduated from the Maxim Gorky Literary Institute in 1947.

Ivan Ivanovich (1949) was the first in a trilogy of novels about the titular neurosurgeon, followed by Druzhba ("Friendship", 1954) and Derzanie ("Daring", 1958). Ivan Ivanovich was awarded the 1950 Stalin Prize.

Her novel Dar zemli ("Gift of the Earth", 1963) was about oil workers. She also wrote On the Ural River (1971) and her memoirs, Severnoe Siianie ("The Northern Lights", 1977).
