= Maria Arbatova =

Russian and Soviet writer, politician and feminist (born 1957)

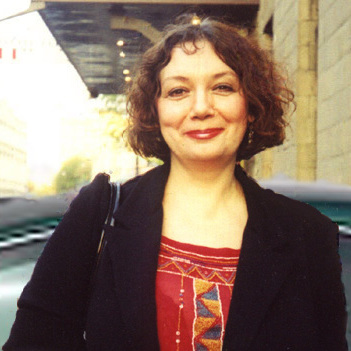
- Born: 17 July 1957 (age 69); Murom, Soviet Union
- Writing career
- Genres: fiction, plays, poetry, TV, journalism
- Notable work: On the Road to Ourselves

Maria Ivanovna Arbatova (Russian: Мари́я Ива́новна Арба́това, born 17 July 1957), is a Russian novelist, short story writer, playwright, poet, journalist, talkshow host, politician, and one of Russia's most widely known feminists in the 1990s. When growing up, she was already showing strong controversial ideologies, for instance, she refused to join the Young Communist League, for she preferred to be "a hippy". She studied at the Faculty of Philosophy at Moscow State University, in the Dramatic Arts division of the Gorky Literary Institute, and underwent training in psychoanalysis. She had to leave state university of Moscow "due to ideological conflicts." When she was 19, she became a mother of twins, which complicated her educational processes. She continued studying at the Maxim Gorky Literature institute. After finishing her studies, Maria published some prose and poetry works, however she returned to writing drama, as she claims it is more natural expression for her than other genres. In the pre-perestroika years, the years before 1985, her literary works were banned by censorship. Before glasnost and perestroika, the political program of restructuring and openness of Michail Gorbatsjov, Arbatova had just one play staged, a play that was commissioned. An example of a play that was censored is the play called "Equitation with two knowns". It was banned by the ministry of culture for 10 years. The play is about a female gynecologist performing abortions. The play was misinterpreted as a statement of good or bad of abortion. However the purpose of the play is to bring up the unfair share of responsibility for birth control and child-raising. Nowadays Arbatova is a member of the Moscow Writer's Union and the Union of Theatrical Workers of Russia. She is the author of fourteen plays staged in Russia and abroad, twenty books, and numerous articles in newspapers and periodicals. She has received multiple accolades for her literary and public achievements.

== Early life ==
Maria Arbatova (originally Gavrilina) was born in 1957 in Murom. Her parents gave her complete freedom and the run of her grandfather's apartment in the Arbat. This apartment had once belonged to the famous singer Fyodor Chaliapin and provided Maria with her pen name of Arbatova, which she took as her legal last name in 1999. Known as a non-conformist since her youth, she refused to join the Komsomol because it stood in contradiction to her principles.

She studied in the School of Young Journalists at Moscow State University, later transferring to the Faculty of Philosophy. She left the University due to ideological issues. She then studied in the Dramatic Arts division of the Maxim Gorky Literature Institute, and underwent training in psychoanalysis. She was also a hippie activist. In the pre-perestroika years, her literary works were banned by the censorship. Today she is a member of the Moscow Writer's Union and the Union of Theatrical Workers of Russia.

=== Arbatova as a feminist ===
Arbatova is seen as one of Russia's first feminists. She was the first feminist with a national, later even international, audience. An interview she is internationally known for, is the article in which she suggests Russia starts importing Indian men, for they are much more suitable as husbands.[3]Russian men have always been outnumbered, Arbatova suggests marrying Indian men, for they match emotionally. One could see this statement as anti-feminist, but Arbatova disagrees. In her opinion, being a feminist does not necessarily mean that one has to hate the opposite sex.

=== Feminist ideas in her work ===
In general, Arbatova in her feminist ideas advocate against the traditional male-female relationship in Soviet society. Women do not value their creative potential and consider marriage as a highest possible social achievement. In her own autobiography Mne sorok let (I am Forty, 1997) María makes an example of her mother, who she believes was the starting point for María to become a feminist. Women cannot fulfill their lives only through their role as a wife\mother. This lack of emancipation is partly a fault of Soviet society in which the status of women was often totally dependent on husbands, despite Soviet preach for the male-female equality.

Her prose text My Last Letter to A illustrates the modern era of liberation and rebellion of women against the traditional relationship of women being dependent on men. This work is a collection of short insights of María's thoughts and personal experiences from her private and public life. All of them criticize phallocracy. She openly addresses "this hopeless male world" [5], which denies the same rights for women.

In My Name is Women published in 1997, Maria addresses the issue of the conditions in maternity hospitals. She discusses in an angry tone her experience of giving a birth and concludes with words : "All this happened to me seventeen years ago for the sole reason that I am a woman. And as long as there are people who do not regard this as a suitable subject for discussion it will happen each day to other women, because being a woman in this world is not something worthy of respect, even when you are doing the only thing that men cannot do."

== Career ==
She is the author of 14 plays staged in Russia and abroad, 20 books, and numerous articles in newspapers and periodicals. Her books and plays, coming from one of the first Russian woman writers with an openly feminist ideology, won the hearts of a wide audience. She co-hosted the popular television show I, Myself (Ya Sama), a program that ran for almost ten years. It was chiefly due to her efforts that the words "feminism" and "feminist" acquired legitimacy in the post-Soviet era. Since 2005, she has conducted a human rights related program The Right to be Yourself on Radio Mayak.

Beginning in 1991, along with to her literary and media activities, she spearheaded the activities of Harmony, a feministic club for the psychological rehabilitation of women. She has also provided individual counselling since 1996. From 1996 onwards, her Club of Women Interfering in Politics has sought a more equal representation of women in Russian politics.

She joined the ranks of the liberal Soyuz Pravikh Sil (Union of Right Forces), and made an unsuccessful bid in 1999 for election to the State Duma from the University district of Moscow and, subsequently, wrote an account of her experience in the novel How I Fairly Tried to Get Into the Duma. In 2000, she conducted the political campaign of Ella Pamfilova, the first woman to run for the Presidency of Russia. Arbatova applied for the post of the Human Rights Plenipotentiary of Russia and, from 2001 to 2003, was the leader of the Human Rights Party. In 2005, she was among the leaders of the political block Free Russia during the Moscow municipal elections.

Despite her hippie years and literary background, Arbatova lived much the same life and shared the same problems as most Soviet women. Her first marriage to singer Alexander Miroshnik broke up, and she had to bring up 2 twin sons (Peter and Pavel, born in 1977) by herself. Her second marriage to Oleg Vitte didn't survive Arbatova's political activity and the State Duma elections she took part in. She is currently married to Shumit Datta Gupta, a financial analyst.

Maria Arbatova's activities, through her books, her numerous appearances and statements in the press and her social work, have brought to the forefront the theme of discrimination against Russian women. She has always refused grants for her activities, rejecting monetary gains for her "missionary" work.

== English translations ==
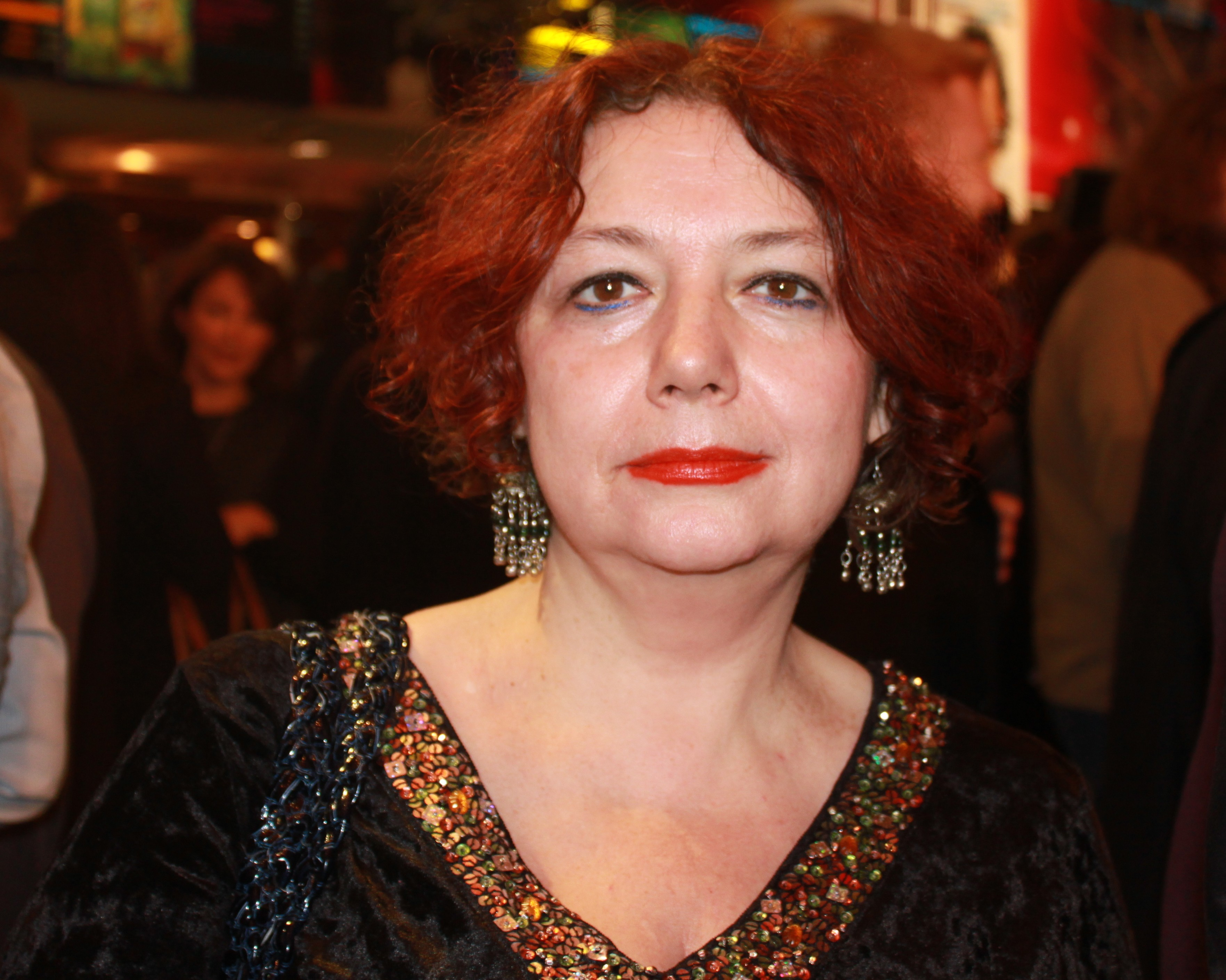
Maria Arbatova in 2009.

- On the Road to Ourselves, (play), from Russian Mirror: Three Plays by Russian Women, Psychology Press, 1998. ISBN 90-5755-024-5

(Years refer to the date of the publication of the translation)

=== Prose ===
•My Last Letter to A (2006), published in War and Peace: Contemporary Russian Prose

=== Short stories ===
•My Name is Women - (2003) published in Nine of Russia's Foremost women writers •My Teachers ( 1996 ) - published in A Will and a Way

=== Drama ===
•Equation with Two Knowns ( 1996 ) - published in A Way and a Will •On the Road to Ourselves (2013) - published in Russian Mirror: Three Plays by Russian Women
