= Salmon: A Red Herring =

2020 book by Cooking Sections

- First edition
- Author: Cooking Sections
- Language: English
- Genre: Non-fiction
- Publisher: Isolarii
- Publication date: August 2020
- ISBN: 9781735075006

Salmon: A Red Herring is a 2020 book by the artist duo Cooking Sections, which consists of Daniel Fernández Pascual and Alon Schwabe. The work is associated with the duo's nomination for the Turner Prize in 2021. It discusses the colour salmon, from its use in industrial salmon farming, as well as other ways in which colour has intersected with agribusiness.

An installation of the text was exhibited by Tate Britain in 2021 as part of its commitment to boycott farmed salmon. As a result, Tate galleries no longer serve farmed salmon.
