= Boris Golovin =

Russian-New Zealand composer (born 1955)

Boris Golovin Борис Головин
- Born: Boris Nikolayevich Golovin; 26 May 1955 (age 71); Sverdlovsk, Russian SFSR, Soviet Union (now Yekaterinburg, Russia)
- Genres: Classical music, rock music, world music
- Occupations: Composer, songwriter, poet
- Years active: 1976–present

Boris Nikolayevich Golovin (Russian: Бори́с Никола́евич Голови́н, IPA: [bɐˈrʲiz ɡɐˈlovʲɪn]; born 26 May 1955) is a New Zealand composer and poet of Russian descent.

== Education ==
Golovin studied journalism at Moscow State University from 1975 to 1979. He later attended the Maxim Gorky Literature Institute in Moscow, where he studied poetry from 1982 to 1987. Golovin pursued further education at the University of Waikato in New Zealand, studying at the Conservatorium of Music from 2013 to 2017. He then completed a Master of Music in Composition at the University of Auckland's School of Music from 2017 to 2019, under the supervision of Eve de Castro-Robinson.

== Occupation ==
Golovin began his career as a singer-songwriter while studying journalism at Moscow State University. He became known for performing his own songs, often accompanied by guitar, to live audiences and on television in Moscow and other parts of Russia. Notably, some of his tours were commissioned by the Northern Shipping Company, during which he performed on cargo and fishing ships in the Arctic Ocean. His music has been recognized in national competitions.

== Literary movement ==
Golovin's work is associated with Neoclassicism and Modernism. He published his first book of poetry in Moscow in 1987. Since the late 1980s, Golovin's poetry has been considered influential within the neoclassical movement, although he himself has argued that the term "neoclassical" is tautological, as classical poetry inherently spans both the past and future. Golovin has consistently refused to align himself with any literary group.

== Books ==
- "The flight of a swift" ("Полёт стрижа") 1987
- "Beetles and Giants" ("Жуки и великаны") 1999
- "An overcoat for two" ("Пальто на двоих") 2009
- "Jamé" (The mundane notes of an idiot). Book of poems. 2010 A.D." "ЖАМЭ" (Бытовые записки идиота). Книга стихотворений. 2010 A.D." 2011

== Awards ==
- 1990. The Russian Central House of Writers, Festival of singer-songwriters, Moscow. First Prize.
- 1995. The All-Russia singer-songwriters Fest (Ostankino, Russian TV Channel One, 1994) Second Prize.
