= Yaroslav Melnyk =

Ukrainian-Lithuanian novelist, philosopher, and literary critic

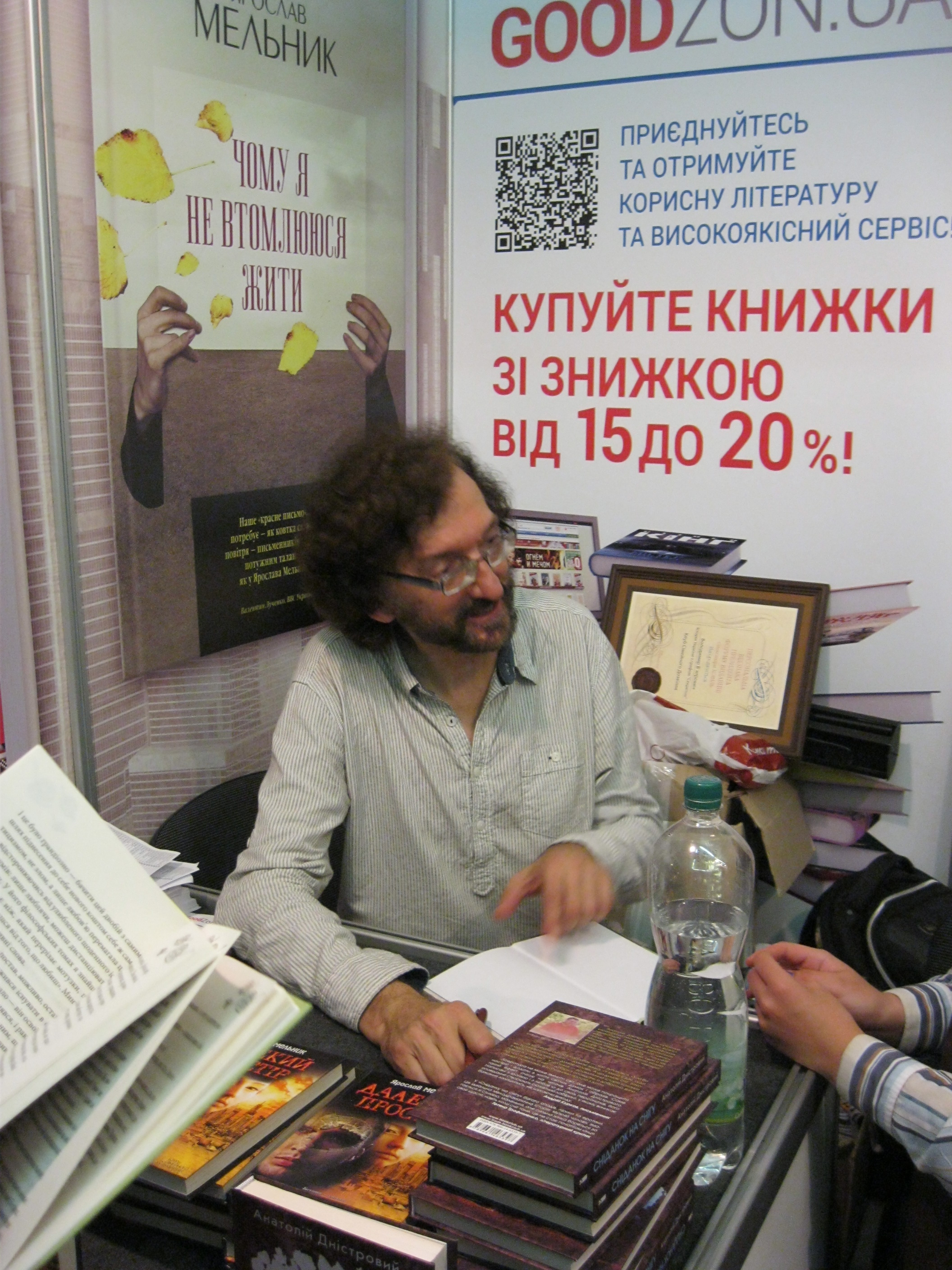
- Born: 6 February 1959 (age 67); Smyha, Rivne Oblast, Ukrainian SSR
- Education: Lviv University
- Occupations: novelist, philosopher, critic

Yaroslav Yosypovych Melnyk (Ukrainian: Ярослав Йосипович Мельник, Lithuanian: Jaroslavas Melnikas; born 6 February 1959) is a Ukrainian and Lithuanian novelist, philosopher, and literary critic.

== Early life ==
Melnyk was born in Smyha in 1959 and holds an undergraduate degree from Lviv University and a postgraduate degree from Maxim Gorky Literature Institute in Moscow.

In 1997, the novel Les Parias d’Eden (The Pariahs of Eden) was published by Robert Laffont Publishers in Paris. It received accolades from France's literary critics and was praised by the country's press.

His dystopian novel "Remote space" (BBC Book of the Year 2013) published in France in 2017, also had real success (Prize Libr'a Nous 2018, Best book of the Year).

Critics call him a mystic and existential writer.

His work is in the compulsory curriculum of secondary schools in Ukraine.

== Career ==
Melnik's books have been among the best Lithuanian and Ukrainian books of the year several times. The End of the World, Distant Space, and Masha, Or Post-fascism were all included in the Top Five Lithuanian Books in their respective publication years. Kelias į rojų (The Road to Paradise) was also named one of the Top Twelve Most Creative Lithuanian Books in 2010 and was nominated for the Europe Book Prize. His book, The Paris Diary (2013), became a bestseller in Lithuania.

Melnik's dystopian novel "Remote Space" (Distant space) won BBC Book of the Year in 2013. It was published in French in 2017 as Espace lointain (Agullo editions, translated from Lithuanian). The novel was awarded a prize for the Book of the Year in France (LIBR'A NOUS 2018, the Imaginary category : 250 bookstores of Francophone countries elected a long list, then a shortlist and finally a winner. Choice of 400 novels). Espace Lointain is being reissued in pocket-sized format in 2018 (ed. Le Livre de Poche).

His dystopian novel Masha, or the Fourth Reich (published in Lithuanian as ‘Maša, arba Postfašizmas’) is shortlisted for “Books of the Year 2014”. In 2016 it was published in Ukraine (shortlisted for the BBC Book Of The Year 2016), and became a bestseller. "In a futuristic novel with a sharp plot titled “Masha, or the Fourth Reich”, which was described by critics as a “shocking work about Nazis and intense love”, the author develops anti-utopian genre and analyzes the sins of humanity" (Planet News review). In 2020, the novel was published in France by Actes Sud.

In 2019, the "Scandinavian" detective Adata Needle by J. Melnik was released, in which the investigation of an unusual sexual crime is accompanied by penetration into the depths of the human psyche. The novel raises the problem of religious sects and Freudian complexes. he book has received a number of nominations.

His work is characterized by its constructivist and philosophical approach, by existential problems and intriguing combinations of science fiction and realism. This is typical for the book Rojalio kambarys (The Grand Piano Room - Last Day).

Critics call him “a Neo-Symbolist of Lithuanian literature”

"Yaroslav Melnyk is the most cosmopolitan Ukrainian writer of the 21st century" (British Library, London)

All of his books in Ukrainian prose were finalist's books of the “BBC Ukrainian Book of the Year” (2012, 2013, 2014, 2016).

== Personal life ==
He divides his time between Lithuania and France.

== Selected works ==
- Freedom, or Sin (Laisvė ar nuodėmė): philosophical essays. Vilnius: Petro ofsetas, 1996.
- The Pariahs of Eden (Les Parias d’Eden): novel. Paris: Robert Laffont, 1997.
- The Grand Piano Room (Rojalio kambarys): long and short stories. Vilnius: Lithuanian Writers' Union publishers, 2004
- The End of the World (Pasaulio pabaiga): long and short stories. Vilnius: Lithuanian Writers' Union publishers, 2006
- A Very Strange House (Labai keistas namas): 88 novels: philosophical miniatures. Vilnius: Lithuanian Writers' Union publishers, 2008
- Remote space (Tolima erdvė, in Lithuanian): novel. Vilnius: Lithuanian Writers' Union publishers, 2008
- The Road to Paradise (Kelias į rojų): surrealistic novel, long and short stories. Vilnius: Baltos lankos, 2010.
- Phone me, talk to me (Телефонуй мені, говори зі мною): novel, long and short stories. Kiev: Tempora, 2012.
- The Paris Diary (Paryžiaus dienoraštis): essays. Vilnius: Alma littera, 2013
- Remote Space (Далекий простір, in Ukrainian): novel. Charkiv: Family Leisure Club, 2013
- Masha, or Post-fascism (Maša, arba Postfašizmas, in Lithuanian): novel. Vilnius: Alma littera, 2013
- Why I Do Not Get Tired of Living (Чому я не втомлююся жити): long and short stories. Charkiv: Family Leisure Club, 2014
- Anorexia (Anoreksija): 22 short stories. Vilnius: Alma littera, 2013
- Masha, or Post-fascism (Маша, або постфашизм, in Ukrainian): novel. Lviv: The Old Lion Publishing House, 2016
- Lords of heaven: novel. Vilnius: Alma littera, 2016
- Remote space (Espace lointain, in French): novel. Paris: Agullo editions, 2017
- Last day (in English, translated from Lithuanian): Noir Press, 2018
- Remote space (Espace lointain, in French, Pocket Edition): novel. Paris: Livre de Poche, 2018
- Masha, or Post-fascism (Macha ou le IV Reich, in French, Actes Sud), 2020
- Remote space (Der weite Raum, in German, Klak Publishing House): novel. Berlin: 2020
