= Irina Bogatyryova =

Russian prose writer

- Born: December 15, 1982; Kazan
- Occupation: Folklorist, writer, traveler, musician, prose writer, editor
- Awards: Student Booker prize (2016); Ilya-Prize (2007)
- Website: http://www.i-bog.ru/

Irina Sergeyevna Bogatyryova (Russian: Ирина Сергеевна Богатырёва; born December 15, 1982, in Kazan) is a Russian prose writer. She is the author of seven books.

Irina grew up in Ulyanovsk. She graduated from Moscow Literature Institute in 2005. She also graduated from the Russian State University for the Humanities.

She is a Oktyabr magazine award winner (2007).

She is a Novy Mir magazine award winner (2020).

Bogatyryova now lives in Moscow.

She is the author of "Кадын" and of "Ведяна".
