= Sophia Romma =

Russian-born American playwright

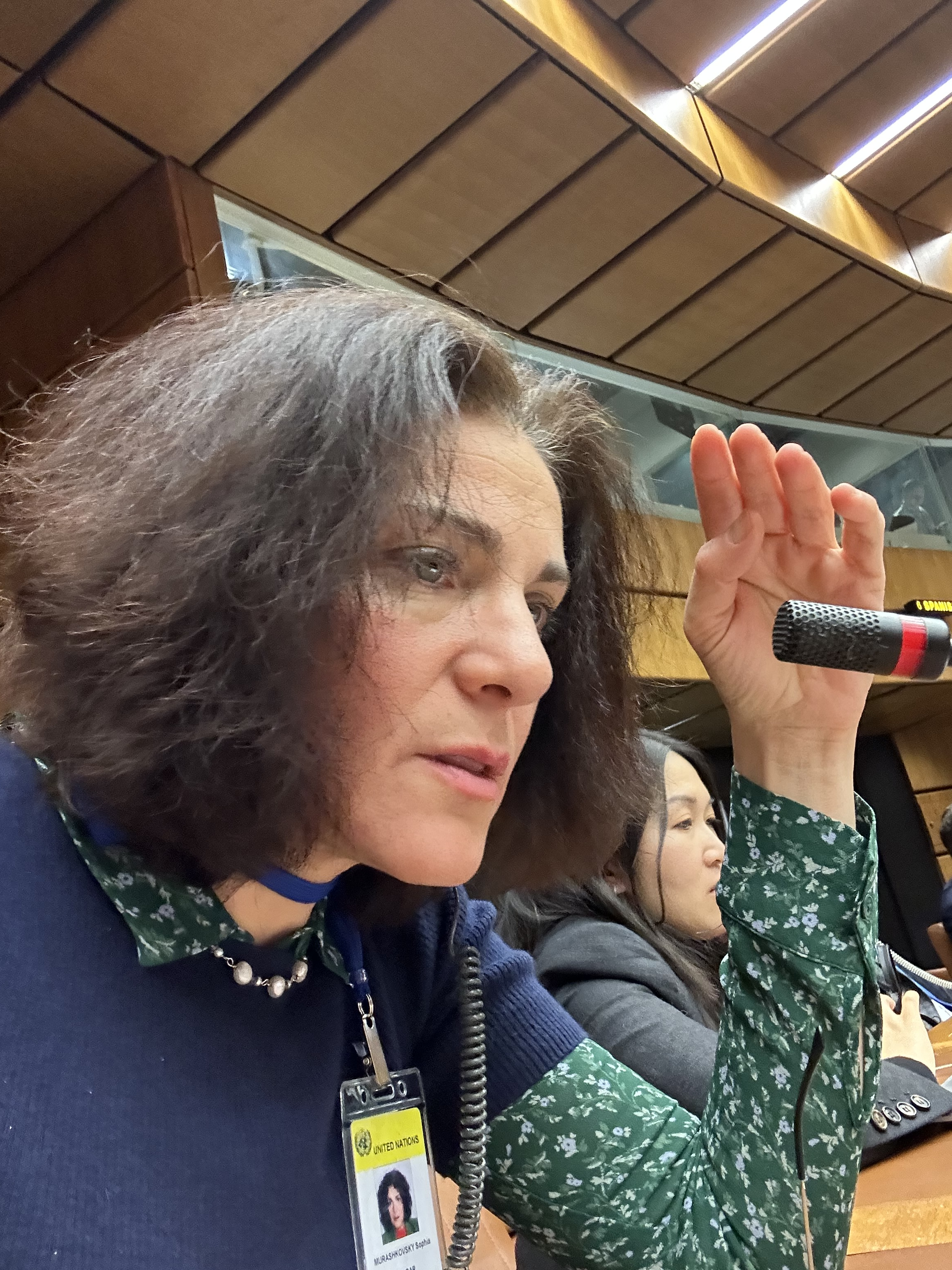
- Born: Sophia Romanovna Murashkovskaya; May 15, 1973 (age 53)

Sophia Romma (née Murashkovsky) is an American playwright known for her one act plays and experimental films. Her work has been reviewed by The New York Times and The Village Voice.

== Early life and education ==
Romma was born in Moscow and emigrated with her parents to the United States in 1979. Professor Romma is of Romani, Romanian, and Polish and Ukrainian Jewish ancestry. She earned a Bachelor in Fine Arts (1995) and a Master's in Fine Arts (1997) from New York University. In 2005, Romma received her Honorary Doctorate Degree in Philology (majoring in 19th Century Russian Literature) with a Minor in French and Slavic languages from the Maxim Gorky Literature Institute. In 2017, Romma graduated from Fordham University School of Law and received her Master of Laws. Romma was the Literary Manager of the Negro Ensemble Company, Inc. and worked closely on theatre productions with Charles Weldon and Leslie Lee.

== Career ==
Romma is the author of 14 off-Broadway plays, and her theater productions have been staged at theaters around the world. At the legendary New York experimental theater La MaMa, three of her plays were staged: In the Eyes of Hope (1997), Coyote, Take Me There! (1999) and Defenses of Prague (2004). Three of her plays have been reviewed by the New York Times: Sickle, two, one act plays (With Aaron's Arms Around Me and The Mire), and The Past is Still Ahead. In 2007, The Village Voice reviewed her play Absolute Clarity.

Romma has also written plays that have been produced as films. Her film "Poor Liza", which starred the Academy Award winning actress Lee Grant and the Drama Desk award winner Ben Gazzara, won first prize for screenwriting and was best original film at the St. Petersburg Literature in Film Festival in St. Petersburg, Russia. Her 2021 film "Used and Borrowed Time" has garnered awards at multiple domestic and international film festivals. Sophia Romma served ten years as a Board Member of the New York University's Alumni Association and was President of the volunteer award-winning NYUAA Alumni Club for three years. Romma was also on the Board of the League of Professional Women in Theatre and served as Co-Chair of the International Committee and of the Oral History Project at Lincoln Center with Betty Corwin. Sophia Murashkovsky Romma is a member of the American Bar Association, the New York State Bar Association and of the New York City Bar Association where she is the Co-Chair of the United Nations Committee. Romma is a member of the European Affairs Committee and a former member of the International Human Rights Committee at the New York City Bar. She also holds a seat at the Council for International Affairs at the NYCBA. Ms. Romma is an International Human Rights Attorney specializing in upholding the rule of law, civil rights and racial justice. Romma teaches American Literature and English Composition and is the Writing Specialist at the Graduate Writing Center at Touro University. Sophia is a member of The Players at Gramercy Park.
