= Yevgenia Belorusets =

Ukrainian author and artist

- Євгенія Бєлорусець
- Writing career
- Notable awards: Internationaler Literaturpreis – Haus der Kulturen der Welt

Yevgenia Markivna Belorusets (Ukrainian: Євгенія Марківна Бєлорусець) is a photographer and writer from Ukraine. In 2020 she won the Haus der Kulturen der Welt International Literature Award.

== Biography ==
Belorusets is part of the curatorial group Hudrada and is co-founder of the journal Prostory. She is known for her reportage with Der Spiegel and Isolarii.

Belorusets has been reporting on her experiences of being in Kyiv during the military attacks from Russia in 2022. In an interview with Deutsche Welle, she described how she wanted "to keep writing, keep telling stories. And do what I can do, here and now. I can't really plan anything in this situation."

She was born in Kyiv. Her father is Mark Abramovych Bielorusetz.

From 1996 to 2002, she studied German language and literature at the Kyiv National Linguistic University.

From 2003 to 2005, she completed postgraduate studies at the University of Vienna, specializing in Austrian literature and philosophy.

In 2005–2006, she studied at the Viktor Marushchenko School of Photography and earned a diploma in documentary photography.

Together with the "Save Old Kyiv" initiative, she participated in protests against illegal construction near her home on Oles Honchar Street in Kyiv. In December 2008, the construction company "Investment and Construction Group LLC" filed a lawsuit against Yevhenia Belorusets and two of her neighbors, accusing them of dismantling a construction fence during one of the protests.

In 2010, she won a social photography contest organized by the British Royal Photographic Society in collaboration with The Guardian. The photo was taken in a dilapidated building at 32-A Hoholivska Street in Kyiv, whose residents had been waiting for resettlement for over 20 years. Belorusets visited the residents over the course of three years. The photo was submitted to the contest by Anastasiya Ryabchuk.

== Bibliography ==
- War Diary, translated by Greg Nissan (New Directions/Isolarii, March 2023)
- Lucky Breaks, translated by Eugene Ostashevsky (New Directions, March 2022)
- Modern Animal (Isolarii, July 2021)
- Glückliche Fälle, translated by Claudia Dathe (Matthes & Seitz, 2019)
- Me and her (Pinchuk Art Center, 2018)
- Happy Fallings (IST Publishing, 2018)
