= Oksana Vasyakina =

Russian author, artist, curator, and feminist activist

Oksana Yuryevna Vasyakina (Russian: Оксана Юрьевна Васякина; born 18 December 1989) is a Russian author, artist, curator, and feminist activist. Her work has been the subject of scholarship in both English and Russian.

== Biography ==
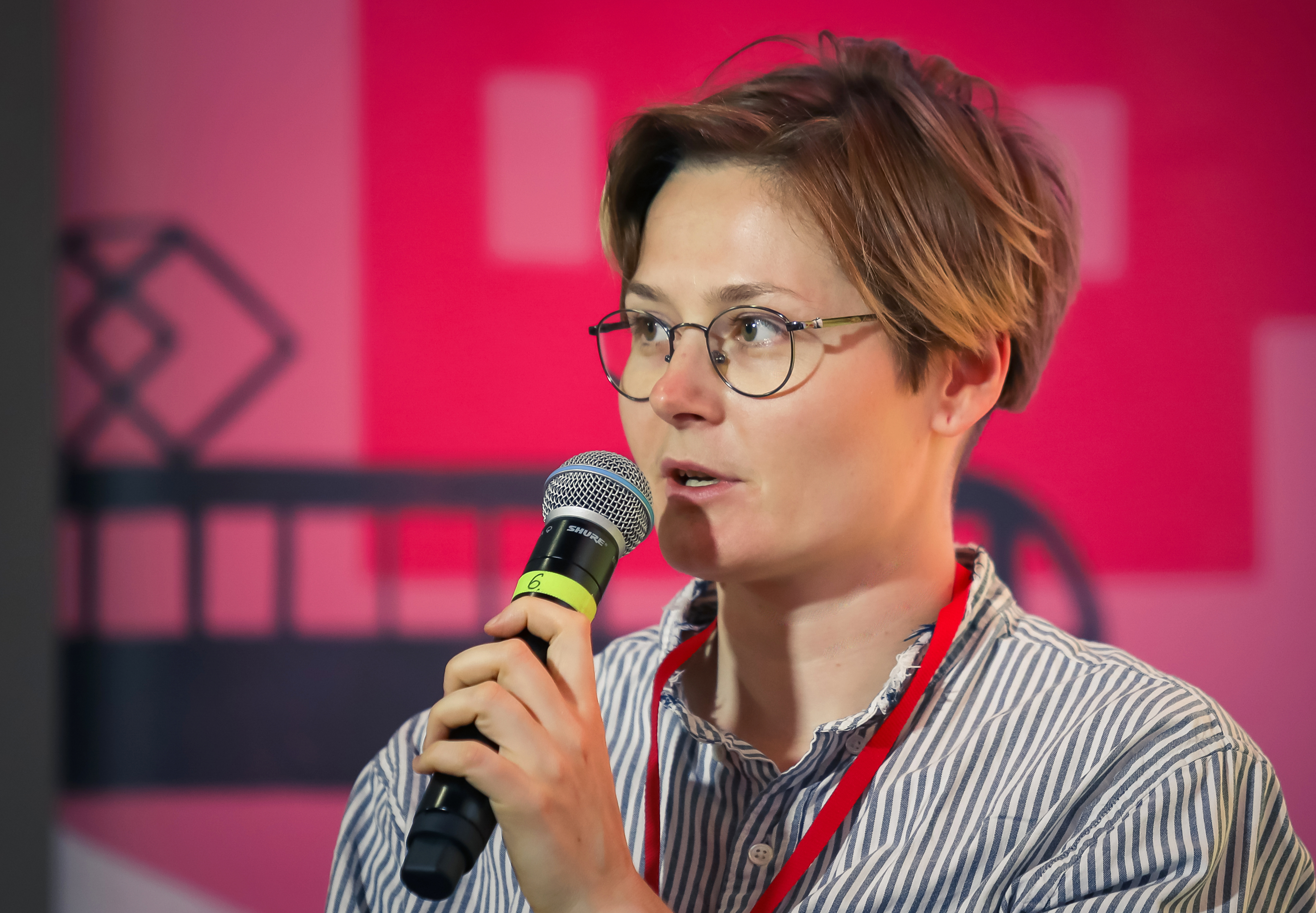
Oksana Vasyakina

Oksana Vasyakina was born on December 18, 1989, in the city of Ust-Ilimsk, Irkutsk in a working-class family. She wrote her first poetic text at the age of 14. In 2016 she graduated from the poetry department of the Maxim Gorky Literature Institute.^{[needs citation]}

Vasyakina has participated in poetry festivals and slams in Novosibirsk, Perm, Vladimir and Moscow. Her work has been published in a variety of magazines, including Vozduch, Colta.ru, and Snob. In 2019 she was awarded with the prestigious Lyceum Pushkin Prize for her poetic cycle "When We Lived in Siberia".

Vasyakina's first poetry collection, Женская проза (English: Women's Prose or Chick lit) was published in 2016, followed by the self-published Ветер ярости (English: Wind of Rage) in 2017. Wind of Rage is a lengthy poem focusing on the experiences of a sexual abuse survivor and was originally distributed for free. In 2019, Wind of Rage along with several other poems and interviews was re-published by AST in a collection of the same name. An English translation by Jonathan Brooks Platt, entitled "Wind of Fury -- Songs of Fury", was published in Sinister Wisdom in 2018.

Vasyakina's first novel Рана (English: Wound: A Novel) was published in 2021. The novel was shortlisted for Big Book Award. Wound, which deals with the narrator's relationship to her recently deceased mother, was followed by two sequels, Степь (English: Steppe) in 2022 and Роза (English: Rose) in 2023. Steppe chronicles the narrator's relationship with her father, a truck driver who died of AIDS, while Rose is centered around the short life of her aunt Svetlana and deals with the narrator's coming to terms with her own mortality and mental illness. An English-language edition of Wound, translated by Elina Alter, was published by Catapult in 2023.

== Scholarship ==
Vasyakina's novel Wound has been the subject of scholarship on post-Soviet women's literature, feminist literature, and trauma in art. Her poetry cycle, Wind of Fury, Songs of Fury has been analyzed by one scholar as a space of exploring the conflict between femininity and trauma. Vasyakina's work has been read analytically in connection with other contemporary feminist poets and writers, such as Olga Breininger, Maria Boteva, and Galina Rymbu.

The first-person narrator of Vasyakina's three novels, Wound, Steppe, and Rose, shares her name and general life history with the author. As such, these novels are of particular interest to scholars of the emerging genre of autofiction.
