= Georgi Dzhagarov =

Bulgarian playwright, poet and politician

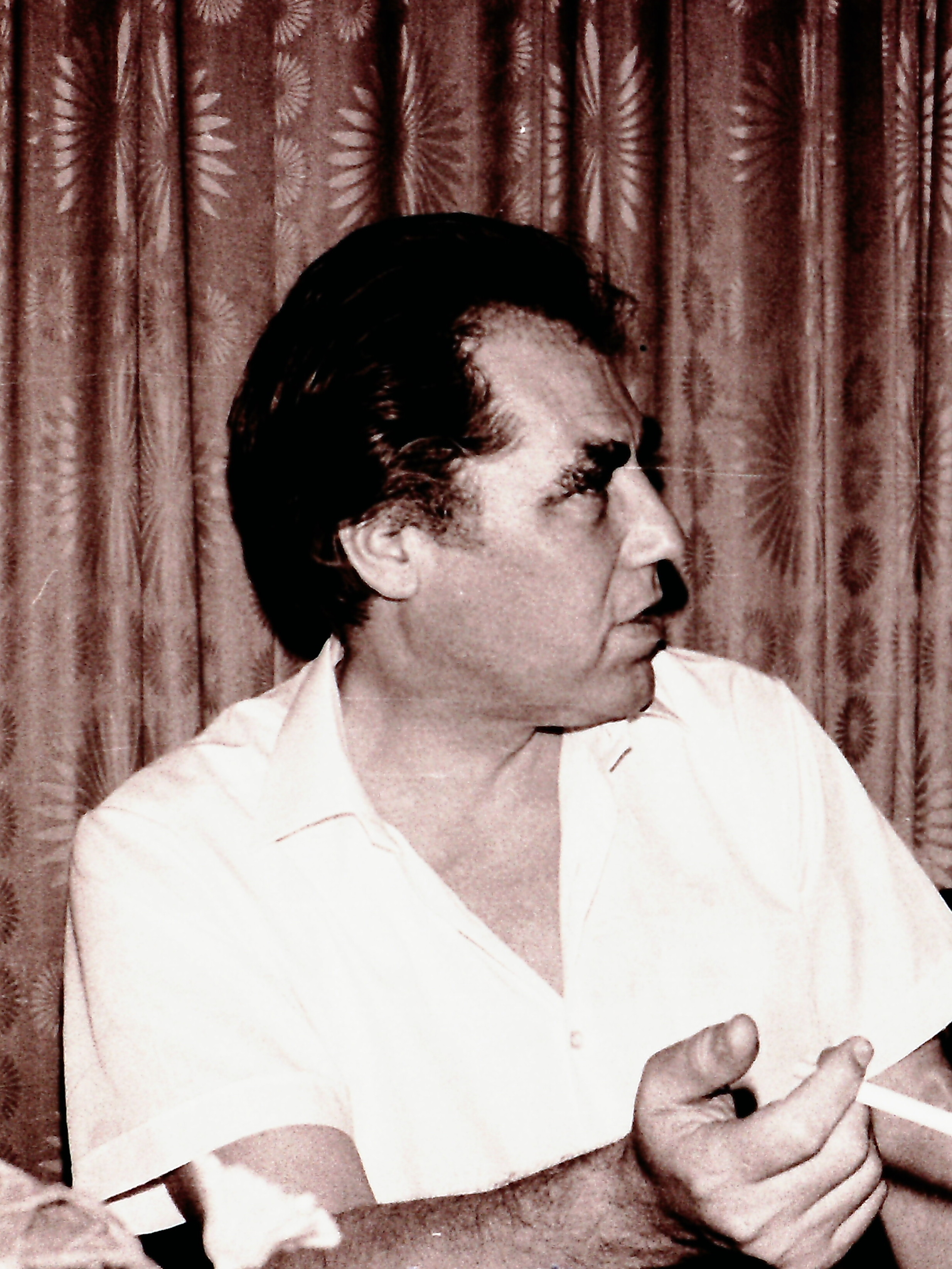
Bulgarian writer Georgi Dzhagarov

Georgi Dzhagarov (Bulgarian: Георги Джагаров; 14 July 1925 in Byala, Sliven Province – 30 November 1995 in Sofia) was a Bulgarian playwright, poet, politician, and former chairman of the Bulgarian Writers Association. He also served as vice-president of the Bulgarian State Council for eighteen years.

== Biography ==
After completing his primary education in 1940, he became a member of the Workers Youth League, and from 1944 – of the Bulgarian communist party. While still a student, he was sentenced to fifteen years in prison for anti-fascist activities, and was released after the Communist coup d'état.

In 1951 he graduated Maxim Gorky Literary Institute in Moscow. Upon returning to Bulgaria, he became an editor at the Literary Front weekly, and was a playwright for the Youth Theater. From 1966 to 1972, he was Chairman of the Union of Bulgarian Writers.

During the years of the Todor Zhivkov dictatorship, he served as an informal confidant and was a member of a group of Zhivkov's associates, known as the "hunting companions".

From 1971 to 1986, he was in charge of the "Council for Development of the Spiritual Values of Society" in the State Council. In 1985 he was head of the Bulgarian delegation to visit Pope John Paul II in the Vatican.

He died of cancer at the military hospital in Sofia. In 2004 the Union of Bulgarian Writers has established an award for poetry, named after him.

One of his most famous plays is The Public Prosecutor, which was adapted into English C. P. Snow. It was first performed in 1964 at the Third National Review of the Bulgarian Theatre. The English adaptation was produced in London at the Hampstead Theatre in 1967.
