= Clarence Felder =

American character actor

- Born: September 2, 1938 (age 87); St. Matthews, South Carolina
- Occupation: Character actor
- Years active: 1971–present

Clarence Felder (born September 2, 1938) is an American character actor who has starred in films and on television, and co-starred in ten Broadway productions. He is also a playwright and director. His play Captain Felder's Cannon was adapted as the feature film All for Liberty (2009), in which he starred.

== Overview of career ==
Felder's first feature film performance was in Man on a Swing (1974); his other films include After Hours (1985), Ruthless People (1986), The Hidden (1987), The Last Boy Scout (1991), and The Ride (1997). He stars in the award-winning feature film All for Liberty (2009), portraying his ancestor, Capt. Henry Felder, an American Revolutionary War hero of the Backcountry of South Carolina. It was based on his play Captain Felder's Cannon.

His starring role on a television series was as Insp. Bobo Pritzger in ABC's 1980s hit series Hooperman. Felder has starred in many TV movies, including Playing for Time, The Mystery of the Morro Castle, and The Killing Floor. He has made numerous guest appearances on prime time TV series, including Kojak, Hill Street Blues, Alien Nation, Dream On, L.A. Law, and NYPD Blue.

On Broadway, Felder co-starred with Christopher Walken in Macbeth, with Glenn Close in Love for Love, Colleen Dewhurst in Queen & the Rebels, and Meryl Streep in Memory of Two Mondays. He played Debbie Harry's father in Teaneck Tanzi.

He is the co-founder of Actors' Theatre of South Carolina and their film division, Moving Images Group.

== Personal life ==
Felder was born and grew up in St. Matthews, South Carolina, where his family had deep historical roots. He went away to college and became involved in acting, spending much of his career in Hollywood. He is married to actress/writer/director, Chris Weatherhead. He has one daughter, Helen Huggins.

== Filmography ==
- 1974 Man on a Swing as Coach
- 1977 The Goodbye Girl as Critic
- 1979 The Seduction of Joe Tynan as Golf Pro
- 1980 Below the Belt as Unknown
- 1982 The Neighborhood as Crony
- 1983 Touched as Ralph
- 1983 Slayground as Orxel
- 1984 The Killing Floor as Unknown
- 1985 After Hours as Bouncer
- 1985 Marie as Jack Lowery
- 1986 Ruthless People as Lieutenant Walters
- 1987 Amazing Grace and Chuck as Dick Ferguson
- 1987 The Hidden as Lieutenant John Masterson
- 1989 A Nightmare on Elm Street 5: The Dream Child as Mr. Gray
- 1991 The Last Boy Scout as Detective Mick McCaskey
- 1993 Reckless Kelly as Hollywood Police Lieutenant
- 1997 The Ride as Mike Stillwell
- 2009 All for Liberty as Captain Henry Felder
- 2010 Republic of Pete as Barlow
- 2010 Angel Camouflaged as Mr. Carl
- 2016 - John Laurens' War - Henry Laurens
- 2022 - Frederick Douglass: No Turning Back - Pastor Brewster
