= Aleksandr Skorobogatov =

Contemporary Belarusian writer

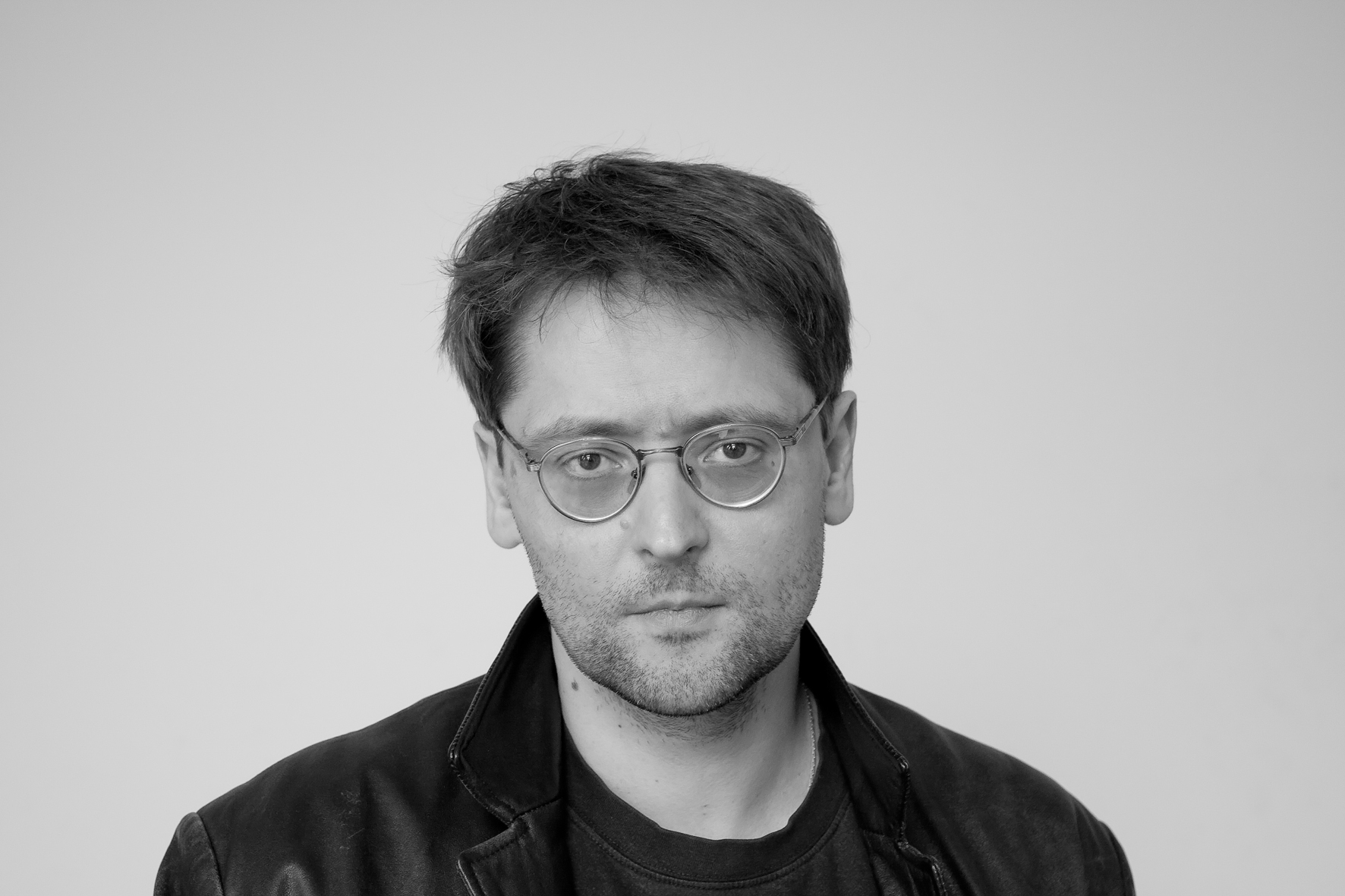
- Born: Aleksandr Viktorovich Skorobogatov; August 11, 1963 (age 63); Grodno, Byelorussian SSR, Soviet Union (now Belarus)
- Citizenship: Belgian
- Education: Maxim Gorky Literature Institute, Moscow
- Occupations: Novelist, short story writer, essayist, journalist
- Children: Vladimir (deceased), Jekaterina, Elisabeth
- Writing career
- Period: Post-Soviet
- Genres: Psychological fiction, surrealist fiction, absurdist fiction, Gothic fiction, War chronicles
- Notable works: Russian Gothic (also as Sergeant Bertrand), Oorlogskronieken (Warchronicles), Cocaïne (Cocaine), De wasbeer (The Raccoon), Achter de donkere wouden (Through the Dark Woods)
- Notable awards: Yunost 'Best Novel of the Year' (1991); International Literary Award Città di Penne (2012); Medal of the President of the Italian Republic (2012); Cutting Edge Award 'Best Book International' (2017); Ark Prize of the Free Word (2024) for Warchronicles; KU Leuven Honorary Medal (2025)
- Website: www.skorobogatov.com

Aleksandr Viktorovich Skorobogatov (Belarusian: Аляксандр Віктаравіч Скарабагатаў, Russian: Александр Викторович Скоробогатов, born 11 August 1963) is a Belarusian-born Russophone writer and journalist based in Antwerp, Belgium. He is regarded as one of the most important contemporary Russophone authors and one of the most original voices in the post-communist Russian literary tradition, known for his surreal, psychologically intense, and often dark narratives. His recent work, particularly Warchronicles and his columns, also positions him as an incisive commentator on contemporary political events, especially the Russo-Ukrainian War, and as a public intellectual engaging with complex moral and historical questions. In September 2025 he published the Dutch-language novel Achter de donkere wouden (English title: Through the Dark Woods), published by De Geus. The novel is narrated in the second person, as a father addressing his murdered son, and draws on real events surrounding the kidnapping and murder of the author's fifteen-year-old son near Moscow in 2002.

== Early life and education ==
Skorobogatov was born in 1963 in Grodno, then part of the Byelorussian SSR, Soviet Union. From an early age, he aspired to be a writer, but his early literary efforts in Soviet Belarus were deemed "ideologically unacceptable," preventing official publication and compelling him towards independent writing until the political climate changed. He studied at the theater institute in Minsk, the Sergius Orthodox Theological Institute in Paris, France, and eventually at the prestigious Maxim Gorky Literature Institute in Moscow, which he entered in 1985 during the early years of Perestroika.

== Career ==
Before gaining recognition as a literary author, Skorobogatov held various jobs, including circus worker, night guard, street sweeper, translator, and journalist. He worked for Russian national radio and later served as a Benelux correspondent for Radio Liberty.

His literary breakthrough came in 1989 with "Palatch" (The Executioner) in the Soviet magazine Yunost. This was followed by his novella Sergeant Bertrand, later published as Russian Gothic. Soviet censors initially felt the need to impose modifications due to its dark tone, but the young writer refused to accept them, and the work was published in Yunost and won the magazine's award for best novel of the year in 1991. He moved to Belgium in 1992.

Several of his works appeared in Dutch translation before being published in Russian, with some novels not yet existing in book form in Russian. He has collaborated closely with Dutch translator Rosemie Vermeulen.

He became a prominent columnist and essayist in leading Flemish and Dutch newspapers like De Standaard and NRC Handelsblad, especially on themes such as war, dictatorship, and moral responsibility.

His 2023 book Warchronicles (Dutch: Oorlogskronieken) compiles these writings. This collection, spurred initially by the 2020 Belarusian protests and intensifying with the full-scale Russian invasion of Ukraine in 2022, serves as a passionate indictment of the Belarusian and Russian regimes and a critique of Western responses. Professor Martin Kohlrausch, in his laudatio for Skorobogatov's KU Leuven Honorary Medal, described him as occupying "a unique position as historian of this time," whose journalistic work raises profound moral and existential questions about engagement and responsibility, often focusing on the plight of the ordinary, vulnerable individual. Warchronicles won the Ark Prize of the Free Word in 2024 for his commitment to "continuing to identify injustice, at the risk of his own life." Skorobogatov has been an outspoken critic of the Russian government, particularly following the invasion of Ukraine, stating he wants nothing to do with "this Russia."

== Literary style and themes ==
Skorobogatov's fiction delves into the darker aspects of human psychology: obsession, violence, grief, and madness. His universe is often depicted as dark, bleak, and violent, populated by malevolent villains and naive fools, where even love is passionate, illusory, and often destructive. It often blurs reality and hallucination, featuring unreliable narrators. His work masterfully blends deep literary knowledge, especially of Russian classics, with experimental storytelling. His style has been compared to Dostoevsky, Gogol, Bulgakov, and Nabokov. Critics have noted Skorobogatov's deliberate cultivation of stylistic and thematic diversity across his body of work, with each novel often exploring different facets of his literary capabilities and being distinct from its predecessors.

Common elements in his fictional work include:

- Unreliable narrators
- Psychological depth
- Surrealism and absurdism
- Dark romanticism
- Dark humor
- Social critique

In non-fiction, he brings moral clarity and literary insight to current affairs, especially war, urging readers to confront difficult histories while upholding values of understanding and tolerance. Professor Pieter Boulogne noted that Skorobogatov "weaves his Belgian experiences into his novels and speaks also to a Belgian audience" through the medium of translation.

== Major works ==
- Sergeant Bertrand / Russian Gothic – 1991
- Audiëntie bij de vorst – 1994 (Dutch; Audience with the Prince)
- Aarde zonder water – 2002 (Dutch; Earth Without Water)
- Portret van een onbekend meisje – 2015 (Dutch; Portrait of an Unknown Girl)
- Cocaïne – 2017 (Dutch; Cocaine)
- De wasbeer – 2020 (Dutch; The Raccoon)
- Warchronicles (Dutch: Oorlogskronieken) – 2023
- Through the Dark Woods (Dutch: Achter de donkere wouden) – September 2025

His works have been translated into numerous languages, including Dutch, English, French, Italian, Greek, Spanish, Danish, Croatian, Russian, and Serbian. The availability of his work in translation, particularly in Dutch through his collaboration with Rosemie Vermeulen, has been crucial to his international presence, with Dutch versions sometimes preceding the Russian book publications.

== Awards and recognition ==
- 1991: Yunost – Best Novel of the Year (for Sergeant Bertrand)
- 2012: Città di Penne Literary Award (Italy – for the Italian edition of Russian Gothic)
- 2012: Medal of the President of the Italian Republic
- 2017: Cutting Edge Award 'Best Book International' (Belgium – for Cocaïne)
- 2024: Ark Prize of the Free Word (Belgium – for Warchronicles)
- 2025: KU Leuven Honorary Medal (Belgium – Faculty of Arts). The medal, conferred in March 2025, recognized Skorobogatov's "exceptional service to society," particularly for his "incisive analyses of the Russian war approach and what nominators termed 'Western indifference.'" The laudations by Professors Pieter Boulogne and Martin Kohlrausch highlighted his unique literary voice, the importance of translation in his work's circulation, his role as a "historian of this time," and his commitment to raising crucial moral and existential questions.

== Reception ==
Skorobogatov's work has generally received widespread critical acclaim, particularly in Europe.

=== Russian Gothic / Sergeant Bertrand ===
Russian Gothic (originally Sergeant Bertrand) has received widespread critical acclaim in both international and European media. Critics have praised Skorobogatov's psychological insight, gothic sensibility, and stylistic intensity.

- The Telegraph described the novel as “part-Gogol, part-Nabokov and thoroughly magnificent... a wonderfully disconcerting read.”
- The Sunday Times called it “a riveting psychological portrait.”
- Publishers Weekly noted it “sketches a chilling portrait of PTSD” using gothic conventions.
- The New York Times lauded the book as “a fevered, lucid descent into madness,” placing Skorobogatov among “the great poets of delirium and madness” in the Russian literary tradition.
- In continental Europe, Belgium's De Tijd declared him “the best Russian writer of the moment,” and France's Le Figaro wrote that Russian Gothic had earned its author “a place in the grand Russian tradition.”

=== Cocaïne ===
Cocaïne (2017, Cocaine) was characterized as an "absurdist literary rollercoaster" that celebrates the power of imagination, engaging the reader in a complex interplay between author, protagonist, and a phantasmagorical Moscow. It was praised for its dark humor and unsettling realism, earning Belgium's Cutting Edge Award for 'Best Book International' in 2017. Rights for Cocaïne have been sold for English, Spanish, Arabic, Serbian, Croatian, and Danish editions.

=== Portret van een onbekend meisje ===
Portret van een onbekend meisje (2015; Portrait of an Unknown Girl) was lauded for its delicate yet intense portrayal of first love set against a backdrop that includes a harrowing depiction of a crime. Critic Guus Bauer for TZUM & Literatuurplein described it as a "genius epos," highlighting its likely autobiographical elements and the author's capacity to evoke profound emotion without resorting to sentimentality, while also addressing themes of guilt and irrevocable loss.

=== De wasbeer ===
The satirical novel De wasbeer (2020; The Raccoon) surprised many readers with its unexpected tenderness and comic tone, being described by some critics as “a modern Gogolian fable.” While maintaining an absurdist premise, with a raccoon protagonist navigating a "jumble of absurdities," the work was praised for its rich linguistic style, dark humor, and ultimately as an "emotional ode to the little man," blending the comical with the poignant. Professor Pieter Boulogne noted that with this novel, Skorobogatov "completely reinvented himself."

=== Achter de donkere wouden ===
Achter de donkere wouden (2025, English title: Through the Dark Woods) received extensive coverage in Flemish and Dutch media. Reviewers highlighted its depiction of paternal grief and its wider reflection on Russian society and violence.

In De Tijd, Jan Dertaelen described the novel as a “devastatingly beautiful elegy for a murdered son”. In Humo, Jan Antonissen called it “an unbearably beautiful book”. In De Volkskrant, Olaf Koens wrote that the author “builds a magnificent monument” to his murdered son. On VRT, Bent van Looy described it as “heart-wrenching, deeply human, and beautiful”, while Bart Schols called it “a magnificent work, in all its tristesse”.

== Personal life ==
Skorobogatov has lived in Antwerp since 1992. In 2002, his fifteen-year-old son Vladimir was abducted near Moscow and later murdered. The abduction and murder form the basis of Skorobogatov's Dutch-language novel Achter de donkere wouden (2025).

== Bibliography ==
=== Novels and Non-Fiction ===
- Sergeant Bertrand / Russian Gothic (1991, originally in Yunost)
- Audiëntie bij de vorst (1994, Dutch). Antwerp: Manteau
- Aarde zonder water (2002, Dutch). Antwerp: The House of Books
- Portret van een onbekend meisje (2015, Dutch). Amsterdam: Cossee
- Cocaïne (2017, Dutch). Amsterdam: Cossee
- De wasbeer (2020, Dutch). Amsterdam: De Geus
- Warchronicles (Dutch: Oorlogskronieken) (2023). Amsterdam: Querido Facto – Singel Publishers
- Through the Dark Woods (Dutch: Achter de donkere wouden). Amsterdam: De Geus, 2025.
