= Isolarii =

Publisher

- Status: Active
- Founded: 2020
- Founder: Sebastian Clark
- Distribution: Worldwide
- Official website: https://isolarii.com/

Isolarii, stylized as ISOLARII, is an avant-garde media company founded by Sebastian Clark. Launched in September 2020, the company is known for its political activity and unique palm-sized book format.

== History ==
The company was launched after Clark's 2014 experience employed at a smartphone factory in Dongguan, China and reading René Daumal’s allegorical adventure novel Mount Analogue. He saw small-format books such as Daumal's as a kind of "anti-iphone."

In November 2020, Isolarii published F Letter: New Russian Feminist Poetry, which emerged as a symbol for anti-government protests in Russia.

In 2021, Isolarii released Street Cop, a collaborative work by Robert Coover and Art Spiegelman. The release received acclaim from NPR, and was described by The New York Times as a "palm-sized lark."

In 2022, "The War Diary of Yevgenia Belorusets" marked Isolarii's debut in digital reportage. Co-published with Der Spiegel, it was translated daily into various languages. It was adapted into a podcast episode for This American Life and, on March 3, 2023, was cited by German Chancellor Olaf Scholz when announcing changes to Germany's military support for Ukraine. It was later published in print as part of the volume In The Face of War. As an afterword, photographer Nan Goldin officiated a marriage between artists Nikita Kadan and Anti Gonna.

== Critical response ==
Dominick Ammirati wrote in Artforum that “the press has succeeded at imbuing the book form with the psychophysical qualities of a mala, a rosary, kombolói, a smartphone—objects that you pick up and feel almost anxious letting go of.”

Isolarii has been described by curator Hans Ulrich Obrist as an “ingenious book club.”

In 2023, Isolarii faced criticism from former Fox News correspondent Tucker Carlson.

== Bibliography ==
- My Techno-Optimism by Vitalik Buterin
- How to Build a Universe That Doesn't Fall Apart Two Days Later by Philip K. Dick
- Charismatic Spirals by Will Alexander
- Under the Wings of the Valkyrie by Sjón
- A Book of My Own by Scholastique Mukasonga
- Ever Gaia by James Lovelock and Hans Ulrich Obrist
- In The Face of War: Ukraine 2022 by Yevgenia Belorusets, Nikita Kadan and Lesia Khomenko
- The Archipelago Conversations by Édouard Glissant and Hans Ulrich Obrist
- Modern Animal by Yevgenia Belorusets
- Street Cop by Robert Coover and Art Spiegelman
- Purple Perilla by Can Xue
- F Letter: New Russian Feminist Poetry, ed. Galina Rymbu, Eugene Ostashevsky, and Ainsley Morse
- Salmon: A Red Herring by Cooking Sections
