= Anna Golubkova =

Soviet writer, poet and literary critic

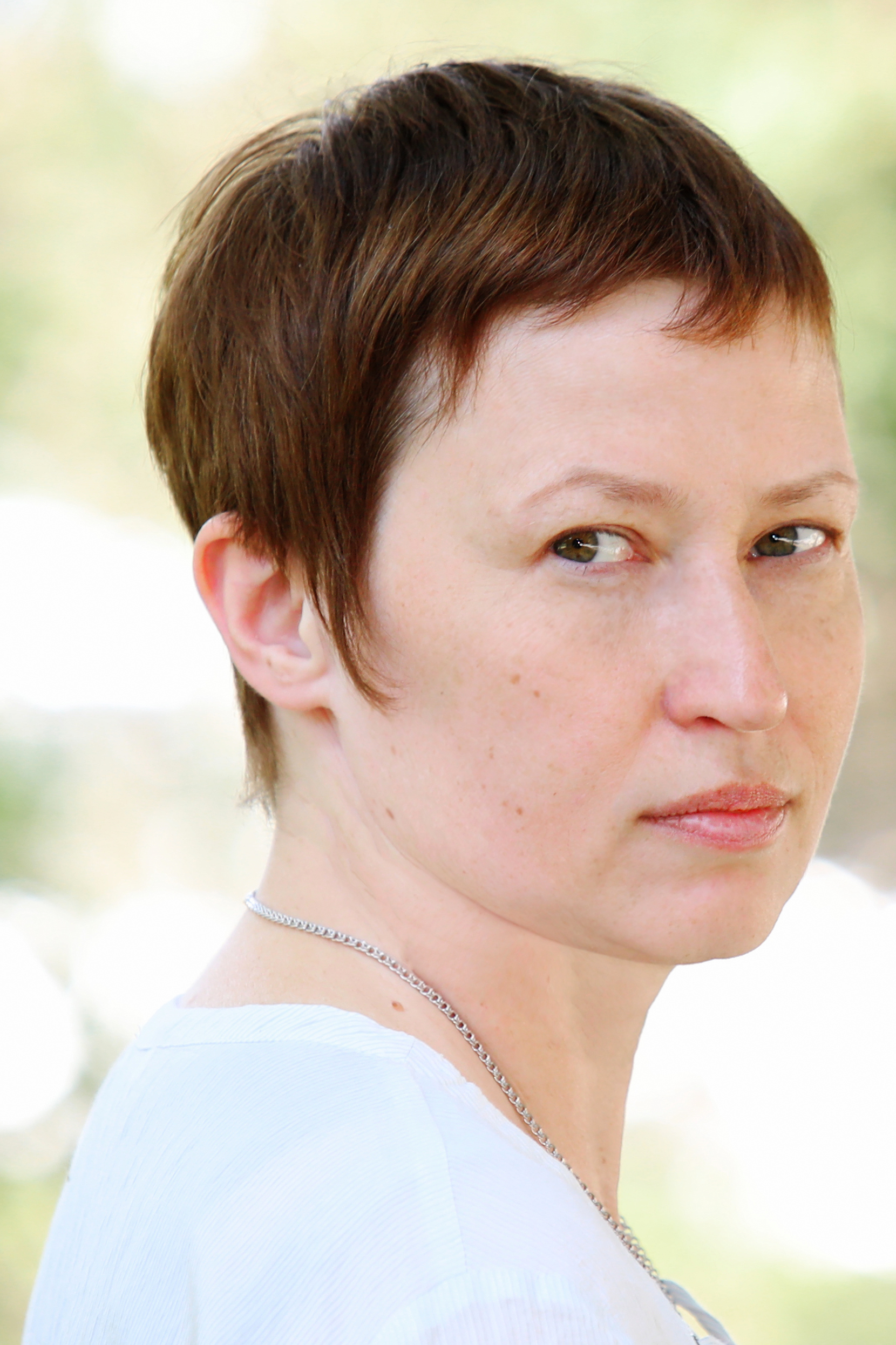
- Golubkova in 2019
- Born: March 24, 1973 (age 53); Tver, RSFSR
- Education: Tver State University; Moscow State University

Anna Anatolyevna Golubkova (Russian: Анна Анатольевна Голубкова; born March 24, 1973, in Tver, RSFSR) is a Russian author of books and philologist. She is also a literary critic and Rozanov scholar. She is a Candidate of Philological sciences. She is an alumnus of the Faculty of History of the Tver State University in 1995, and of the Faculty of Philology of the Lomonosov Moscow State University in 2002. She defended her candidate's dissertation «Критерии оценки в литературной критике В.В. Розанова».

She lives in Moscow (since 1997).

Her first book was published in 2004. Her first book of poems was published in 2010. She is author of monograph «Литературная критика В.В. Розанова: опыт системного анализа» (2013).
