= Alma littera =

Lithuanian publisher

- Status: Private
- Founded: November 16, 1990; 34 years ago
- Founder: Arvydas Andrijauskas
- Country of origin: Lithuania
- Headquarters location: Ulonų st. 2, LT-08245 Vilnius,
- Distribution: Nationwide
- Key people: Dovilė Zaidė, Director
- Publication types: Books
- Revenue: 7 million € (2023)
- Official website: www.almalittera.lt

Alma littera is a Lithuanian publishing house, established on November 16, 1990. It mostly publishes educational books and fiction literature. Current Alma littera managing director is Dovilė Zaidė. Knyguklubas.lt is the Alma littera's e-version of the library, opened in 2003.

Alma Littera's catalogue includes several best-selling franchises and authors: Harry Potter by J.K. Rowling, several books by Madonna, The Lord of the Rings by J.R.R. Tolkien, Captain Underpants by Dav Pilkey.

== Acquisitions ==
In 2002, it merged with another publishing house – Šviesa and became the largest publishing house company group in the Baltic States.

In January 2022, Alma littera sold Šviesa, the group's educational division, to the investment company Žabolis ir partneriai.

On September 9, Alma littera was acquired by BaltCap, the largest private-equity fund in the Baltic States.
