= Boris Yampolsky =

Boris Yampolsky (Russian: Борис Самойлович Ямпольский (1912–1972), was a Russian writer and editor, born in Ukraine, the influences of whose Jewish childhood who remain a theme throughout his work.

== Biography ==
Yampolsky was born in 1912 in Bila Tserkva, in the Kiev Governorate of the Russian Empire. In 1927, he left his hometown to take over the editorship of a newspaper, initially in Baku, and subsequently in Novokuznetsk. Around this time his first two independent publications appeared, the story «Они берегут ненависть» (Тифлис) and collection of sketches, «Ингилаб». He later studied at the Maxim Gorky Literature Institute. Published in 1940 in Moscow, Boris Yampolsky's tale "Country Fair" (Russian title: "Yarmarka") is one of the finest works of Jewish-Russian literature.

His subsequent career involved spells in the Caucasus and Russia, where he was caught up in the post-Second World War crackdown on Jewish intellectuals.
