= Eugene Ostashevsky =

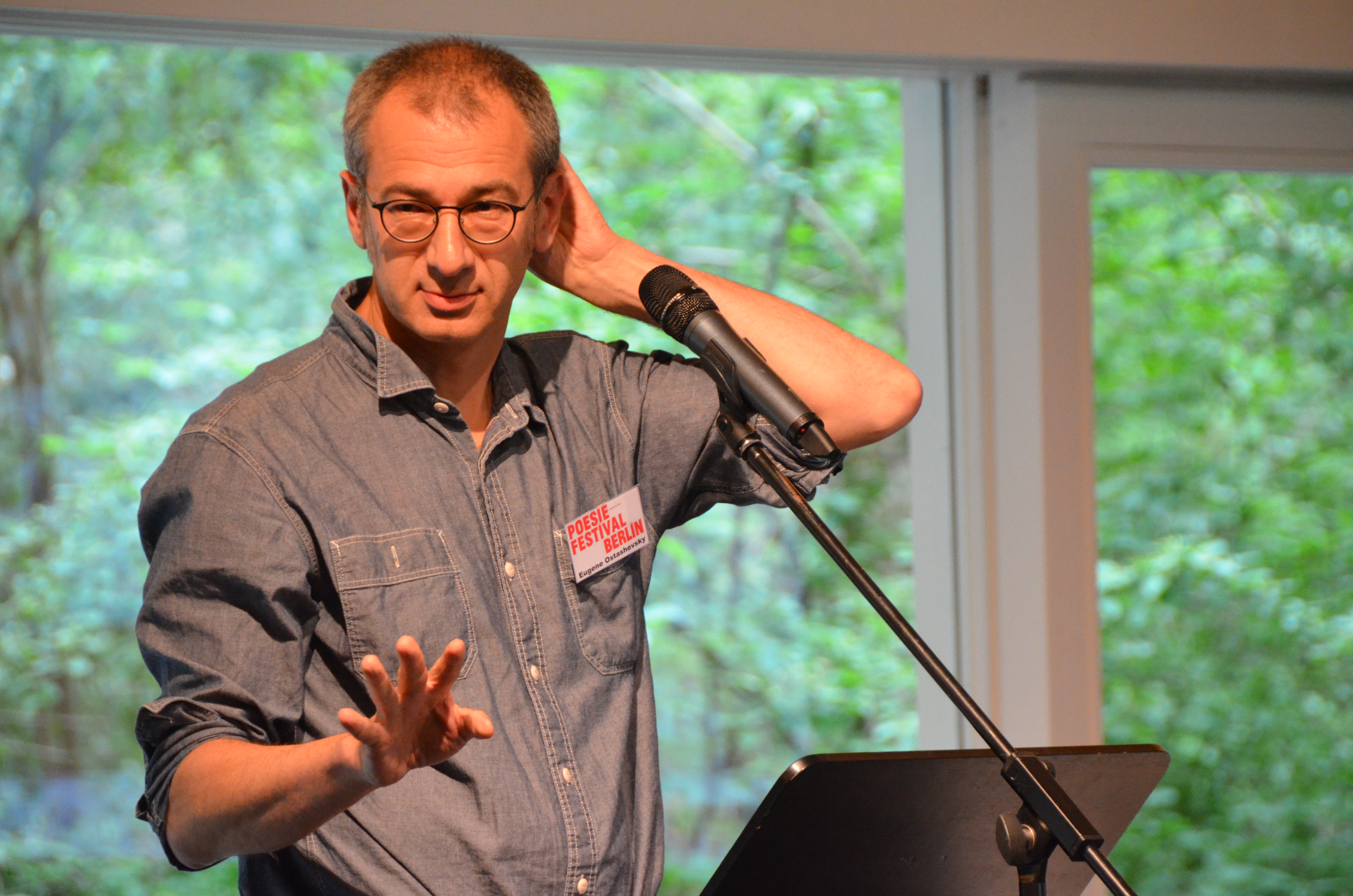
Eugene Ostashevsky

Eugene Ostashevsky (born 1968) is a Russian-American writer, poet, translator and professor at New York University.

== Early life and education ==
Ostashevsky was born in Leningrad. He immigrated with his parents to the United States when he was 11 years old. They settled in New York City.

Ostashevsky has a PhD from Stanford University.

== Personal life ==
Ostashevsky is based in Berlin. He is the father of two daughters.

English, Russian, German, Turkish, and German Sign Language are spoken in his family, but not all by him.

== Awards and honors ==
- 2014 (with Matvei Yankelevich) The ALTA National Translation Award, for An Invitation for Me to Think by the Russian poet Alexander Vvedensky (translated by Ostashevsky and Yankelevich)
- 2019 Preis der Stadt Münster für Europäische Poesie, together with the translators Monika Rinck and Uljana Wolf, for the volume of poetry The Pirate Who Does Not Know the Value of Pi

== Poetry ==
- The Feeling Sonnets NYRB Poets, 2022
- The Pirate Who Does Not Know the Value of Pi NYRB Poets, 2017
- The Life and Opinions of DJ Spinoza Ugly Duckling Presse, 2008
- Enter Morris Imposternak, Pursued by Ironies Ugly Duckling Presse, 2008
- Iterature Ugly Duckling Presse, 2005

== Translation and Scholarship ==
- F Letter: New Russian Feminist Poetry; trans. with Galina Rymbu and Ainsley Morse. Poetry. ISOLARII, 2020.
- The Fire Horse: Children’s Poems by Vladimir Mayakovsky, Osip Mandelstam, and Daniil Kharms NYRB Children, 2017.
- Arkadii Dragomoshchenko Endarkenment: Selected Poems Wesleyan University Press, 2014.
- Alexander Vvedensky An Invitation for Me to Think NYRB Poets, 2013. Winner of National Translation Award, 2014.
- OBERIU: An Anthology of Russian Absurdism. Poetry, fiction, and drama by Alexander Vvedensky, Daniil Kharms, Nikolai Zabolotsky, Nikolai Oleinikov, Yakov Druskin and Leonid Lipavsky Ed.; trans. with Matvei Yankelevich Northwestern University Press, 2006.
- Dmitry Golynko. As It Turned Out Ed.; trans. with Rebecca Bella. Poetry. Ugly Duckling Presse, 2008.
