= Galina Rymbu =

Russian poet and author (born 1990)

Galina Rymbu (Russian: Галина Георгиевна Рымбу) (born 20 July 1990, Omsk) is a Russian poet, author, translator, and curator.

== Life and career ==
Rymbu was a student in the philology and theology departments of Omsk Pedagogical University and graduated from the Maxim Gorky Literature Institute. She went on to a Master's program in socio-political philosophy at the European University at Saint Petersburg and then to teach at the Saint Petersburg School of New Cinema. She has lived in L'viv since 2018. She is an activist as well as a writer affiliated with Isolarii.

Rymbu's earliest work appeared in Omsk regional publications and in online publications. Subsequently her work began to be published in Vozdukh, ShO, Volga, Novoe literaturnoe obozrenie, Gvideon, Translit, Snob, and on websites Colta.ru, Polutona, Megalit, Setevaia slovesnost', and Na seredine mira. Her poetry has appeared in English translation in many international journals, including n+1, Arc Poetry, The White Review, Berlin Quarterly, Music & Literature, Asymptote, Powder Keg and others. Rymbu's poetry collections are published in Latvian and Dutch translations. Her poetry has also been translated into German, Spanish, Swedish, Italian, Polish, and Ukrainian.

Rymbu also does translations of poetry from Ukrainian into Russian. She is primarily interested in poetry as a form of public speech and thought. Rymbu edited and contributed to F Letter: New Russian Feminist Poetry, the first anthology of feminist poetry from Russia.

== Awards and honors ==
Rymbu was longlisted for the Debiut prize 2009, and short listed for the same prize in 2010. In 2010 she was also one of three finalists for the LiteraturRRentgen prize, took second place in the Moscow poetry slam, and won the grand prize in the Molodoi literator festival in Nizhnyi Novgorod. She was a winner of the Moskovskii schet prize (2014) and the Poetry Without Borders International Festival poetry prize (Riga, 2017).
