= Maxim Gorky Literature Institute =

Institution of higher education in Moscow, Russia

Coordinates: 55°45′45″N 37°36′08″E

- Литературный институт им. А. М. Горького
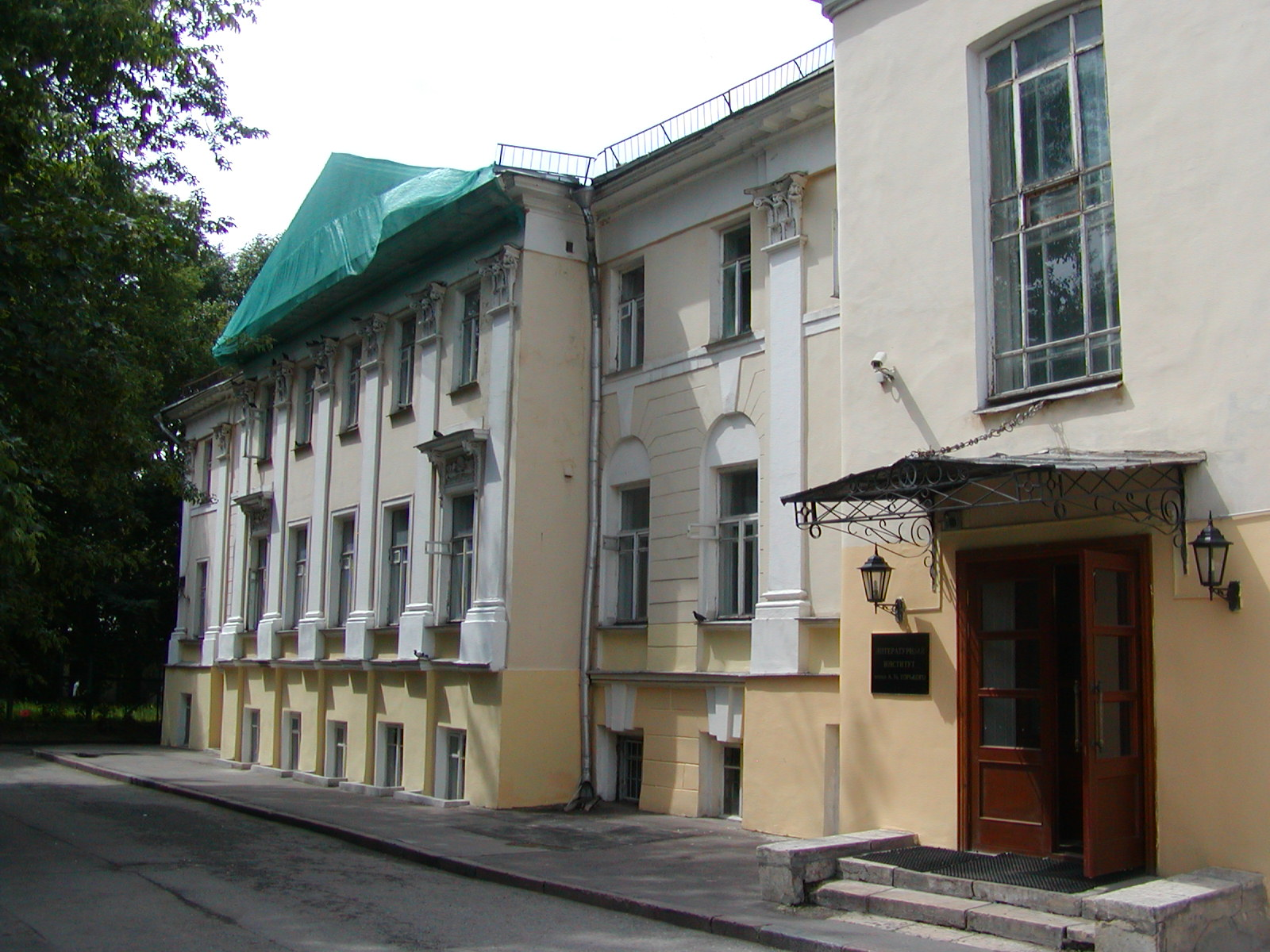
- Type: Public
- Established: 1933
- Rector: Alexei Varlamov
- Location: 25 Tverskoy Boulevard, Moscow, Russia
- Website: litinstitut.ru

The Maxim Gorky Literature Institute (Russian: Литературный институт им. А. М. Горького) is an institution of higher education in Moscow, Russia. It is located at 25 Tverskoy Boulevard in central Moscow.

== History ==
The institute was founded in 1933 on the initiative of Maxim Gorky, a writer, founder of the socialist realism literary method, and a political activist. It received its current name at Gorky's death in 1936.

The institute has been at the same location, not far from Pushkin Square, for more than seventy years, in a complex of historic buildings dating back to the 18th and 19th centuries. The main building at 25 Tverskoy Boulevard was the birthplace of Alexander Herzen and frequented by well-known writers of the 19th century, including Nikolai Gogol, Vissarion Belinsky, Pyotr Chaadayev, Aleksey Khomyakov, and Yevgeny Baratynsky.

In the 1920s it housed various writers' organizations and a literary museum. It also provided accommodations for writers, including Andrei Platonov, Vsevolod Ivanov, Osip Mandelstam, and Boris Pasternak. Mikhail Bulgakov used it as the model for "Griboyedov House" in The Master and Margarita.

== Curriculum ==
The institute's curriculum includes courses in the humanities and social sciences and seminars on a variety of literary genres, including prose, poetry, drama, children's literature, literary criticism, writing for the popular press, and literary translation. It has graduate and doctoral programs and a standing committee for doctoral and candidate dissertation defenses. The institute offers a two-year program of Advanced Literary Courses for highly qualified students, and its Literary Institute oversees an Advanced Literary Translation School, as well as courses in Editing, Copyediting and Foreign Languages. It also has a high school and offers preparatory courses for applicants to the Literary Institute.

== Notable alumni ==
=== Politics ===
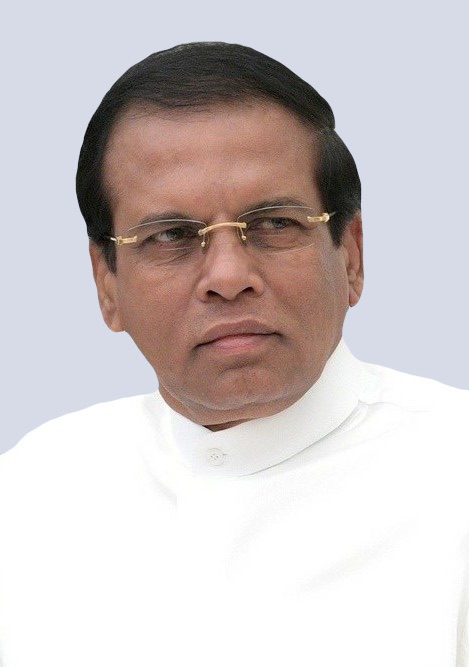
Maithripala Sirisena

- Maithripala Sirisena (President of Sri Lanka 2015–2019)
- Nambaryn Enkhbayar (President of Mongolia 2005–2009)

=== Poets ===
- Alexander Galich (poet, singer-songwriter)
- Bella Akhmadulina (poet)
- Boris Golovin (poet, singer-songwriter)
- Borys Bilash (poet, writer)
- Drago Siliqi (writer, literary critic, publisher)
- Fazu Aliyeva (poet)
- Georgi Dzhagarov BulgariaBulgarian (poet)
- Halima Xudoyberdiyeva (People's Poet of Uzbekistan)
- Hovhannes Shiraz (poet)
- Jabir Novruz (National Poet of Azerbaijan)
- Nikolay Rubtsov (poet)
- Rasul Gamzatov (poet)
- Valentina Radinska BulgariaBulgarian (poet)
- Yevgeny Yevtushenko (poet, singer-songwriter, novelist, essayist, dramatist, screenwriter)
- Yulia Drunina (poet, writer)
- Hasab al-Shaikh Ja'far (poet)

=== Writers ===
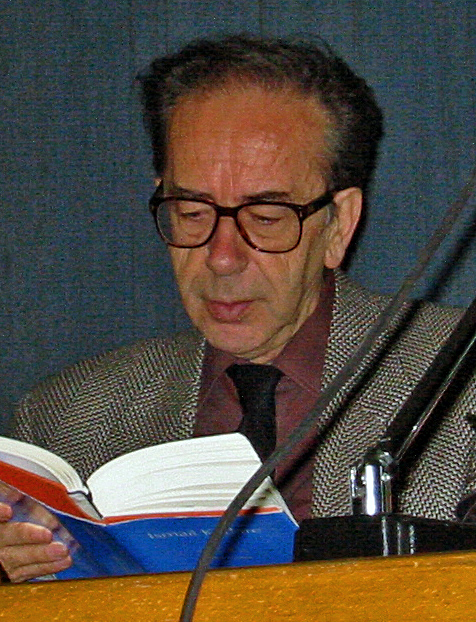
Ismail Kadare

- Anatoli Kim (writer)
- Chinghiz Aitmatov (novelist)
- Fatmir Gjata (writer, journalist)
- Fazil Iskander (novelist)
- Irina Bogatyryova (writer)
- Ismail Kadare (novelist, poet, essayist)
- Aigul Kemelbayeva (writer)
- Jaroslav Melnik (writer)
- Svetlana Vasilenko (writer, poet)
- Konstantin Simonov (writer)
- Maria Alyokhina (writer, musician, activist)
- Maria Arbatova (writer, feminist, politician)
- Oksana Vasyakina (writer)
- Oleg Khafizov (writer)
- Oleg Pavlov (writer)
- Vasily Belov (writer)
- Viktor Astafyev (novelist)
- Viktor Pelevin (novelist)
- Yuri Bondarev (writer)
- Yuri Kazakov (writer)
- Aleksandr Skorobogatov (writer)
- Yury Trifonov (writer)
- Antonina Koptiaeva (novelist)
- Grigory Baklanov (novelist)
- Vladimir Karpov (novelist)
- Boris Yampolsky (writer)
