= 890s =

Decade

The 890s decade ran from January 1, 890, to December 31, 899.

== Events ==
=== By place ===
==== Europe ====
- The Frankish nobles, who have ruled Provence in anarchy (since 887), declare Louis the Blind (a son of the late usurper King Boso) ruler of Lower Burgundy, at an assembly at Valence.
- The sovereignty of Svatopluk I, ruler (knyaz) of Moravia, is confirmed in Bohemia. Lusatia becomes a part of his kingdom (approximate date).

==== Britain ====
- King Alfred the Great begins to commission and undertake a series of translations into Old English, beginning with his own version of Pope Gregory the Great's Pastoral Care.
- Lord Æthelred II and Lady Æthelflæd (a daughter of Alfred the Great) of the Mercians found the Priory of St. Oswald in Gloucester (probably originally dedicated to St. Peter).
- Ohthere of Hålogaland, a Norse Viking seafarer, narrates the story of his travels to Alfred the Great, who arranges for it to be written down.
- King Anarawd ap Rhodri of Gwynedd makes the first ceremonial visit to an English court (that of Alfred the Great).
- King Donald II of Scotland expels the British aristocracy of Strathclyde. They flee south to North Wales.
- The town of Kirby Muxloe (in modern-day Leicestershire) is founded in England (approximate date).

=== By place ===
==== Europe ====
- February 21 – Guy III, duke of Spoleto, is crowned Holy Roman Emperor by Pope Stephen V. His son Lambert is proclaimed king of Italy, at the capital of Pavia in Lombardy.
- Summer – Orso, Lombard prince of Benevento, is deposed after the capture of Benevento by the Byzantines. Benevento becomes the capital of the thema of Longobardia.
- Battle of Leuven: Viking raiders on the Dyle River (near Leuven), in modern-day Belgium, suffer a crushing defeat by Frankish forces under King Arnulf of Carinthia.

==== Emirate of Córdoba ====
- Muslim forces led by Abdullah ibn Muhammad al-Umawi, Umayyad emir of Córdoba, defeat the rebel leader Umar ibn Hafsun at Poley, in Al-Andalus (modern Spain).

==== Arabian Empire (Caliphate) ====
- June 2 – Al-Muwaffaq, an Abbasid prince and Commander-in-chief, dies at the capital of Baghdad. His son Al-Mu'tadid is recognized as regent, and second heir of the Abbasid Caliphate.

==== Japan ====
- February 25 – Fujiwara no Mototsune, a Japanese statesman, dies. In his lifetime, he had forced the resignation of Emperor Yōzei and become head of the Fujiwara clan.

=== By topic ===
==== Religion ====
- September 14 – Pope Stephen V dies after a 6-year reign. He is succeeded by Formosus, former cardinal bishop of Portus, as the 111th pope of the Catholic Church.

=== By place ===
==== Europe ====
- Summer – Poppo II, duke of Thuringia (Central Germany), is deposed by King Arnulf of Carinthia. East Frankish forces and their Magyar (Hungarian) allies invade Great Moravia.
- Vladimir, ruler (knyaz) of the Bulgarian Empire, signs a military alliance with Arnulf of Carinthia of the East Frankish Kingdom. This alliance works against the pro-Byzantine policy of his father.

==== Britain ====
- Autumn – A Viking force with a fleet of 250 longships arrives at the river mouth of the settlement of Lympne (East Kent). They attack the small fortification (called Eorpeburnan).
- Viking raiders (80 ships) under Hastein arrive in the Thames Estuary, and set up camp at Middleton. King Alfred the Great decides to position his army in the Wealden Forest.

==== Arabian Empire ====
- April – Al-Mu'tadid, the de facto regent of the Abbasid Caliphate, removes his cousin Al-Mufawwad from succession. He becomes caliph himself, after the death of Al-Mu'tamid, returning the capital from Samarra to Baghdad.
- May – Ibrahim II, Aghlabid emir of Ifriqiya, sends a large army to Palermo, to impose Arab authority from Kairouan. After an uprising, the Sicilians make a bid for independence.
- Summer – The Persian nobility installs Isma'il ibn Ahmad, the former governor of Transoxiana, as ruler (emir) of the Samanid Empire, after the death of his brother Nasr I.

==== Asia ====
- Former Silla general Kyŏn Hwŏn seizes the cities of Wansanju and Mujinju, taking over the territory of Baekje. He wins the support of the people, and declares himself king.

=== By place ===
==== Europe ====
- Vladimir, ruler (khan) of the Bulgarian Empire, is dethroned by his father Boris I, with help from loyal boyars. He is blinded, and succeeded by his brother Simeon I, as prince of Bulgaria; the capital is moved from Pliska to Preslav. Simeon makes an alliance with the Pechenegs (or Patzinaks), a semi-nomad Turkic tribe from the Central Asian steppes.
- An East Frankish expeditionary force under Zwentibold, the eldest son of King Arnulf of Carinthia, crosses the Alps into Friuli. He makes junction at Verona, with the army of the deposed king Berengar I, and proceeds to lay siege to Pavia. After a three-month campaign, Zwentibold receives orders to head back to Bavaria, in case of a Magyar intervention.
- The 13-year-old Charles III (the Simple), the posthumous son of Louis the Stammerer, is crowned king of the West Frankish Kingdom at the Reims Cathedral—though he is not recognized as such by King Odo (or Eudes) until 898.
- King Alfonso III repopulates the city of Zamora with Mozarabs (Iberian Christians who have lived under Moorish rule) from Toledo in Al-Andalus (modern Spain).
- Galindo II Aznárez succeeds his father Aznar II Galíndez as count of Aragon (until 922).

==== Britain ====
- Spring – Prince Edward, the son of King Alfred the Great, defeats the Danish Viking raiders at Farnham, and forces them to take refuge on Thorney Island. At the same time, Danes from East Anglia sail around the Cornish coast, and besiege Exeter.
- Spring – A Viking army under Hastein moves to a fortified camp at Benfleet (Essex). The Danish camp is captured by the Saxons, while the army is out raiding. Hastein is forced to retreat to Shoebury.
- Summer – Battle of Buttington: A combined Welsh and Mercian army under Lord Æthelred besieges a Viking camp at Buttington in Wales. The Danes escape with heavy losses, and take their families to safety in East Anglia.
- Autumn – Danish Vikings under Hastein take the city of Chester, after a rapid march from East Anglia. Alfred the Great destroys the food supplies, forcing them to move into Wales.
- Asser, bishop of Sherborne, writes his Life of King Alfred in Wessex. He studies for 6 months each year in Alfred's household.

==== Arabian Empire ====
- Spring – Caliph Al-Mu'tadid recognizes Khumarawayh as autonomous emir over Egypt and Syria, in exchange for an annual tribute of 300,000 dinars. The Jazira provinces of Diyar Rabi'a and Diyar Mudar are returned to the Abbasid Caliphate. Muslim forces recover direct control of Mosul (modern Iraq) from the Shayban.

==== Eurasia ====
- March 23 – 893 Ardabil earthquake. Several earthquake catalogues and historical sources describe this earthquake as a destructive earthquake that struck the city of Ardabil, Iran. The magnitude is unknown, but the death toll was reported to be very large. The USGS, in their "List of Earthquakes with 50,000 or More Deaths", give an estimate that 150,000 were killed, which would make it the ninth deadliest earthquake in history.
- December 28 – An earthquake destroys the city of Dvin in Armenia.

=== By topic ===
==== Religion ====
- Council of Preslav: The Byzantine clergy is expelled from Bulgaria, and the Greek language is replaced with Old Bulgarian (also known as Old Church Slavonic), as an official language.
- King Yasovarman I (called the Leper King) of the Khmer Empire (modern Cambodia) dedicates the Lolei Temple of the Roluos group to the god Shiva and the royal family.

=== By place ===
==== Byzantine Empire ====
- Byzantine–Bulgarian War: Stylianos Zaoutzes, leading minister and basileopator, convinces Emperor Leo VI (the Wise) to move the Bulgarian market from Constantinople to Thessaloniki. This affects the commercial importance of Bulgarian trade. Simeon I, ruler (khan) of the Bulgarian Empire, mobilizes his Bulgarian forces and invades Byzantine territory, ravaging the countryside.

==== Europe ====
- Spring – King Arnulf of Carinthia invades Italy at the head of an East Frankish expeditionary army, joining up with the deposed king Berengar I at Verona. He conquers Brescia after little resistance, and sacks Bergamo after a one-month siege. The cities of Milan and Pavia open their doors to Arnulf. Emperor Guy III escapes from Pavia, to hide in the mountains of Spoleto (Umbria).
- March – Arnulf of Carinthia proceeds to Piacenza, and from there invades central Italy. After a successful campaign, he calls the invasion off and returns to Pavia – probably because Duke Rudolph I of Burgundy was threatening to invade Lorraine. Arnulf has himself proclaimed King of Italy at Pavia, leaving Berengar I as his vice-regent in Italy.
- Arnulf of Carinthia returns to Germany through the Alps, harried by militias dispatched by Rudolph I of Burgundy and margrave Anscar I of Ivrea. Only with much difficulty is Arnulf able to get his army through the Aosta Valley and through St. Moritz, back into Germany. Guy III descends from the Apennines, and re-seizes the Italian kingdom.
- December – Guy III dies after a 4-year reign, and is succeeded by his 14-year-old son Lambert, already associated as co-emperor since 892. At the pleading of Archbishop Fulk of Reims, Pope Formosus reconciles with the young emperor. Lambert proceeds from Spoleto to Pavia, where he is acclaimed and crowned with the Iron Crown of Lombardy.
- Svatopluk I, ruler (knyaz) of Great Moravia, dies after a 34-year reign, in which he has united the Slavic tribes in his kingdom. He is succeeded by his eldest son Mojmir II. The Principality of Nitra (modern-day Slovakia) is given as an appanage to his brother Svatopluk II.
- Árpád, head of the confederation of the Hungarian tribes, comes to an agreement with the prince of the Moravians, Svatopluk II, that Hungarian and Moravian armies will together expel the Eastern Franks from Pannonia.
- Prince Petar of Serbia defeats his revolting cousin Bran; he is captured and blinded (according to a Byzantine tradition that meant to disqualify a person from taking the throne).

==== Britain ====
- The Vikings in Northumbria and East Anglia swear allegiance and hand over hostages to King Alfred the Great, but promptly break their truce by attacking the southwest of England. A Viking force returns from Exeter and sails along the coast, in an attempt to plunder Chichester. They are defeated by the Saxon garrison, losing many ships and men.
- King Anarawd of Gwynedd's shaky alliance with the Vikings collapses. His kingdom is ravaged by the Norsemen. Anarawd is forced to ask for help from Alfred the Great and submits to his overlordship. Alfred imposes oppressive terms and forces Anarawd's confirmation in the Christian Church, with Alfred as 'godfather'.
- Autumn – Battle of Benfleet: Danish Viking forces retire to Essex, after being deprived of food by Alfred the Great (see 893). They draw their longships up the Thames and into the Lea, entrenching themselves at Benfleet.

==== Japan ====
- Emperor Uda orders commercial relations (called Imperial Japanese embassies to China) to cease with China (approximate date).

=== By place ===
==== Europe ====
- The Magyars are expelled from western Siberia, and settle in the Carpathian Basin, under the leadership of Árpád (the traditional date of 896 held during the 20th century has proved to be erroneous). Emperor Leo VI (the Wise) seeks aid from the Magyars, and after crossing the Danube on Byzantine ships, they ravage Bulgarian territory.
- Simeon I (the Great), ruler (khan) of the Bulgarian Empire, seeks refuge in the fortress of Drastar, while the Magyars reach the outskirts of the capital Preslav. Facing a difficult situation with war on two fronts, Simeon calls for a truce. Leo VI sends the diplomat Leo Choirosphaktes to Bulgaria, to negotiate the terms.
- King Odo (or Eudes) takes a large army against Rheims, and forces anti-king Charles the Simple to flee to Germany. King Arnulf of Carinthia, throwing off his agreements with Odo, charges his illegitimate son Zwentibold to invade the West Frankish Kingdom, and re-install Charles on the throne.
- May – Arnulf of Carinthia summons the Imperial Diet in his residence at Worms. Angered by the non-appearance of Charles the Simple, he again supports Odo's claim to the throne of the West Frankish Kingdom. In the same assembly, he crowns Zwentibold as king of Lotharingia.
- Guy IV, duke of Spoleto, conquers Benevento (after the Byzantines have moved the capital of Byzantine Italy from Benevento to Bari). Guy makes himself prince, thereby uniting the two Italian states. The Byzantines attempt to retake Benevento, but are defeated by Lombard troops.
- December – Arnulf of Carinthia invades Italy, at the head of an East Frankish expeditionary army. He arrives in Pavia and reorganizes the Lombard state. Arnulf partitions the northern part of the kingdom: the western half (March of Lombardy) and the eastern half (March of Verona).
- Arnulf of Carinthia crosses the Po River and divides his army in two: one corps (Swabian) proceeds to Florence (via Bologna), while the other corps (Franks) moves through the Lunigiana to the precincts of Rome.
- Spytihněv I, duke of Bohemia, together with the Slavník prince Witizla, breaks away from Great Moravia, and swears allegiance to Arnulf of Carinthia in Regensburg.

==== Britain ====
- King Anarawd of Gwynedd is supplied with English troops, to assist in his reconquest of Seisyllwg (Wales). He is successful, and his brother Cadell is finally able to take his rightful place on the Seisyllwg throne.
- Autumn – King Alfred the Great blockades the Lea River and builds fortifications, trapping the Danish Vikings at Hertford. They abandon their longships and escape to Bridgnorth, located in the Severn Valley.

==== Arabian Empire ====
- Hamdan ibn Hamdun, a Taghlibi Arab chieftain, is defeated and captured by Caliph Al-Mu'tadid at the fortress of Mardin (near modern Cizre). Hamdan's son Husayn enters Abbasid service, beginning the rise of the Hamdanid Dynasty.

==== Mexico ====
- Birth of Topiltzin, future emperor of the Toltec Empire, in Michatlauhco, modern-day Morelos (approximate date).

=== By topic ===
==== Music ====
- The Musica enchiriadis is composed, marking the beginning of western polyphonic music (approximate date).

=== By place ===
==== Europe ====
- February – King Arnulf of Carinthia invades Italy at the head of an East Frankish expeditionary army. He storms Rome (the Leonine City), and has himself crowned Holy Roman Emperor by Pope Formosus at St. Peter's. Arnulf sets out to establish his authority in Spoleto, but suffers a stroke; he is forced to call off the campaign, and returns to Bavaria.
- March – King Lambert II proceeds to re-conquer Italy. Heading north, he captures western Lombardy, and decapitates count Maginulf of Milan. In the meantime, the deposed king Berengar I recovers Verona (March of Friuli) from Arnulf's candidate, count Walfred of Verona, who dies in office with "great fidelity to the emperor".
- Battle of Southern Buh: Bulgarian forces under Simeon I ('the Great') defeat the Magyars, near the banks of the Southern Buh river (modern Ukraine). The Magyars withdraw from Bulgaria, and are forced to migrate to new pastures. Led by Árpád, they settle in the Carpathian Basin (modern Hungary).
- Summer – Battle of Boulgarophygon: Simeon I invades the Theme of Thrace (in the southeastern Balkans). The Byzantines transfer a new army to Europe, to deal with the Bulgarian threat. The armies clash at Boulgarophygon (modern Turkey); the Byzantines are completely destroyed in battle.
- November – Lambert II and Berengar I agree to sign a treaty at Pavia. Berengar receives the realm between the Adda and the Po, while the rest stays under the control of Lambert (including the March of Tuscany). They share Bergamo, and Lambert pledges to marry Gisela, Berengar's daughter.
- Prince Klonimir, pretender to the throne of the Serbian Principality, is defeated by his ruling cousin, Petar. He is recognized as sole ruler of Serbia by Simeon I, resulting in a 20-year peace and alliance (approximate date).

==== Britain ====
- Summer – King Alfred the Great orders the building of English warships (almost twice as long as the longships) on the Itchen at Southampton, against the Danish Viking raiders in Wessex.
- A Viking pirate army under Hastein (a son of Ragnar Lodbrok) ravages the Welsh kingdoms of Brycheiniog and Gwent (approximate date).

==== Arabian Empire ====
- Kharijite Rebellion: The Kharijite uprising against the Abbasid Caliphate in Jazira is ended. Caliph Al-Mu'tadid reunifies the entire province under central government, and installs his son and heir, Al-Muktafi, as governor.

==== China ====
- Emperor Zhao Zong appoints Li Keyong, a Shatuo military governor (jiedushi), as Prince of Jin. He becomes the first ruler of Jin (see 907) following the collapse of the Tang dynasty.

=== By topic ===
==== Religion ====
- April 4 – Pope Formosus dies at Rome, after a four-year reign. He is succeeded by Boniface VI, as the 112th pope of the Catholic Church.
- April 26 – Boniface VI dies (probably murdered), after a pontificate of 15 days. He is succeeded by Stephen VI, as the 113th pope of Rome.

=== By place ===
==== Europe ====
- Spring – King Lambert II travels to Rome with his mother, Queen Ageltrude and brother Guy IV, Lombard duke of Spoleto, to meet Pope Stephen VI to receive reconfirmation of his imperial title. Guy is murdered on the Tiber by agents of Alberic I, a Frankish nobleman with political interests. He seizes Spoleto (possibly at the instigation of King Berengar I) and sets himself up as duke.

==== Britain ====
- English warships (nine vessels from Alfred's new fleet) intercept six Viking longships in the mouth of an unknown estuary on the south coast (possibly at Poole Harbour) in Dorset. The Danes are blockaded, and three ships attempt to break through the English lines. Lashing the Viking boats to their own, the English crew board the enemy's vessels and kill everyone on board. Some ships manage to escape, two of the other three boats are driven against the Sussex coast. The shipwrecked sailors are brought before King Alfred the Great at Winchester and hanged. Just one Viking ship returns to East Anglia.

==== Arabian Empire ====
- Caliph al-Mu'tadid recovers control of the Cilician Thughur (southeastern Anatolia) and of northern Syria, during the turmoil in the Tulunid government (approximate date).
- 15 March – Al-Hadi ila'l-Haqq Yahya enters Sa'dah and founds the Zaydi Imamate of Yemen.

==== Japan ====
- Emperor Uda abdicates the throne after a ten year reign. He is succeeded by his 12-year-old son Daigo, as the 60th emperor of Japan.

=== By topic ===
==== Religion ====
- January – The Cadaver Synod: Lambert II orders Stephen VI to exhume the nine-month-old cadaver of former pope Formosus, to redress him in papal robes, and have him put on trial while seated in a chair at St. Peter's. Formosus is 'convicted' of several crimes, his fingers of consecration are cut off, and the body is stripped of his vestments.
- August – Stephen VI is removed from office, imprisoned and strangled in his cell. He is succeeded by Romanus as the 114th pope of the Catholic Church.
- December – Romanus is deposed and succeeded by Theodore II as the 115th pope of Rome, who dies twenty days later.

=== By place ===
==== Europe ====
- January 1 – King Odo I (or Eudes) dies at La Fère (Northern France) after a 10-year reign. His rival, the 18-year-old Charles the Simple in Laon, gains sovereignty and becomes ruler (with no real authority) of the West Frankish Kingdom. This puts an end to five years of civil war between the Frankish nobles.
- Summer – Adalbert II, margrave of Tuscany, revolts (pushed by his wife Bertha) against his cousin, Emperor Lambert II. The Tuscan army proceeds against the Lombard capital of Pavia. Lambert with his forces at Marengo defeats Adalbert at Borgo San Donnino, taking him, as a prisoner, to Pavia.
- October 15 – Lambert II dies from falling off his horse while hunting — or is killed (possibly assassinated by supporters of Maginulf of Milan). After the death of Lambert, his rival Berengar I gains recognition as king of Italy. He releases Adalbert II and receives homage from the Italian nobles.

==== Britain ====
- King Alfred the Great makes his eldest son Edward the Elder co-ruler of Wessex in preparation for his accession to the English throne.

=== By topic ===
==== Religion ====
- January – Pope John IX is consecrated, and succeeds Theodore II, as the 116th pope of the Catholic Church. His rival Serguis III (a Spoletan ally of Lambert II) is excommunicated, and takes refuge at the court of Adalbert II.
- John IX holds councils at Rome and Ravenna to rehabilitate the late Pope Formosus. He condemns the Cadaver Synod of the late Pope Stephen VI, and restores the clergymen who were deposed by Stephen's faction.

=== By place ===
==== Europe ====
- Summer – Arnulf of Carinthia, the King of East Francia, enlists the support of the Magyars, to raid northern Italy. They overrun the Lombard plain all the way to Pavia. King Berengar I assembles a large army against the Magyars, and confronts them near the Adda River. Daunted at the strong force, Árpád (head of the confederation of the Hungarian tribes) offers to make peace and restore much of what they've taken, if they are permitted to leave Italy unmolested. Berengar refuses, and the Magyars withdraw to the Brenta River. Árpád renews his offer, offering to leave all his booty and even some hostages. Again Berengar refuses, and awaits their crossing of the Brenta River for a final battle.
- September 24 – Battle of the Brenta: The Magyar forces, consisting of 5,000 men, take a circuitous route through the mountains, crossing the Brenta River and proceed south to fall upon the encamped Lombard army (15,000 men) at Cartigliano. The Magyars massacre much of Berengar's unprepared army. He himself manages to escape to Pavia, changing his dress with the clothing of one of his soldiers. Árpád renews the offensive and heads across Lombardy, pillaging the countryside around Treviso, Vicenza, Bergamo and other towns all the way to Vercelli. He turns south and heads down the Aemilian Road, sacking Reggio Emilia, Modena and Bologna.
- December 8 – Arnulf of Carinthia dies from paralysis following a stroke and is entombed in St. Emmeram's Abbey at Regensburg (Bavaria). He is succeeded by his 6-year-old son Louis III (the Child) as ruler of the East Frankish Kingdom. Arnulf's counselor Hatto I, archbishop of Mainz, becomes regent and guardian of the young king. Louis (possibly at the instigation of Hatto) claims Lotharingia from his half-brother Zwentibold and with the support of the East Frankish nobles he provokes a civil war. The Lombard throne is left temporarily vacant.
- Winter – The Magyars turn back north towards the shores of the Venetian Lagoon. They pillage Chioggia and Pellestrina, and advance towards Malamocco. Their advance into the lagoon is checked by the assembly of the Venetian fleet under doge Pietro Tribuno, which defeats the Magyar's river crossing vessels at Albiola, causing them to pull back. This close call with the Magyars prompts the Venetians to initiate the fortification of the Rialto and the building of protective chains over the Grand Canal.

==== Britain ====
- October 26 – King Alfred the Great dies after a 28-year reign in which he has forced invading Danish Vikings to withdraw, consolidated England around Wessex, divided parts of Mercia into shires, compiled the best laws of earlier kings, encouraged learning by bringing famous scholars to Wessex and made his own translations of Latin works. He is succeeded by his eldest son, Edward the Elder as king of Wessex.
- Winter – Æthelwold's Revolt: Following the death of Alfred the Great, Æthelwold (youngest son of the late king Æthelred I) disputes the succession of Edward the Elder. He seizes the royal estates at Wimborne, the ancient symbolic burial place of West Saxon kings, and Christchurch. Edward set up his army camp at Badbury Rings. Æthelwold first declares that he will 'live or die' at Wimborne, but then flees to Northumbria.

==== Arabian Empire ====
- Muhammad ibn Ahmad al-Shaybani, Muslim ruler of Diyar Bakr, surrenders at the besieged capital of Amid (modern Turkey) to Caliph Al-Mu'tadid in exchange for clemency. Al-Muktafi, the son of Al-Mu'tadid, is installed as governor of the Jazira (Upper Mesopotamia), ending the semi-independent Shaybanid Dynasty, which has ruled in Diyar Bakr since the 870s.
- The Qarmatians, led by Abu Sa'id al-Jannabi, capture Bahrain's capital of Hajr and Al-Hasa (Eastern Arabia). Abu Sa'id makes it his residence and establishes a religious utopian republic.

=== By topic ===
==== Religion ====
- Regino of Prüm, a Benedictine churchman, is expelled from Prüm and becomes abbot of St. Maximin's Abbey (which is destroyed by the Vikings) in Trier.

== Significant people ==
- Al-Mu'tamid
- Al-Mu'tadid
- Abdallah ibn al-Mu'tazz
- Charles the Simple

== Births ==
890

- Arnulf I, count of Flanders (approximate date)
- Gilbert, duke of Lotharingia (or Lorraine) (approximate date)
- Gorm the Old, Danish Viking king (approximate date)
- Lady Ma, wife of Qian Yuanguan (d. 939)
- Marozia of the Rule of the Harlots, Roman noblewoman (approximate date)
- Motoyoshi, Japanese prince and nobleman (d. 943)
- Olaf Feilan, Icelandic priest and chieftain (approximate date)
- Olga of Kiev, princess and regent of Russia (approximate date)
- Reginar II, Frankish nobleman (d. 932)
- Rudolph, Frankish king (approximate date)
- Ulrich, bishop of Augsburg (approximate date)

891

- Abd al-Rahman III, Umayyad caliph (or 889)
- Ali ibn Buya, founder of the Buyid Dynasty (or 892)
- Gao Conghui, prince and ruler of Jingnan (d. 948)
- Lin Ding, Chinese official and chancellor (d. 944)
- Yuan Dezhao, Chinese chancellor (d. 968)

892

- March 30 – Shi Jingtang, founder of the Later Jin Dynasty (d. 942)
- Ai (Li Zhou), emperor (puppet ruler) of the Tang Dynasty (d. 908)
- Ali ibn Buya, founder of the Buyid Dynasty (or 891)
- Dou Zhengu, Chinese official and chancellor (d. 969)
- Guibert, founder of Gembloux Abbey (d. 962)
- Jing Yanguang, Chinese general and governor (d. 947)
- Saadia Gaon, Jewish philosopher and exegete (or 882)
- Wang Sitong, Chinese general and governor (d. 934)
- Wang Yuanying, crown prince of Former Shu (d. 913)
- Zhang, empress consort of Zhu Youzhen (d. 915)

893

- Abu Muhammad al-Hasan, Arab Muslim geographer (d. 945)
- Al-Qa'im bi-Amr Allah, caliph of the Fatimid Caliphate (d. 946)
- Chen Jinfeng, empress consort of Wang Yanjun (d. 935)
- Cunigunda, Frankish noblewoman (approximate date)
- Flodoard, Frankish canon and chronicler (or 894)
- Hamza al-Isfahani, Persian historian (approximate date)
- Li Hao, Chinese official and chancellor (approximate date)
- Louis the Child, king of the East Frankish Kingdom (d. 911)
- Ulrich (or Odalrici), bishop of Augsburg (d. 973)
- William I (Longsword), duke of Normandy (approximate date)
- Wu Cheng, Chinese politician and chancellor (d. 965)

894

- Æthelstan, king of England (approximate date)
- Emma, queen of the West Frankish Kingdom (d. 934)
- Flodoard, Frankish canon and chronicler (or 893)
- Michael Maleinos, Byzantine nobleman and monk (d. 963)
- Matilda of Ringelheim, queen of Germany (approximate date)
- Minamoto no Tsunemoto, Japanese prince and samurai (d. 961)
- Ono no Michikaze, Japanese calligrapher (d. 966)

895

- March 4 – Liu Zhiyuan, founder of the Later Han (d. 948)
- Al-Muqtadir, caliph of the Abbasid Caliphate (d. 932)
- Gérard of Brogne, Frankish abbot (approximate date)
- Liu Chong, founder of the Northern Han (approximate date)
- Odo of Wetterau, German nobleman (approximate date)
- Sancho Ordóñez, king of Galicia (approximate date)
- Su Yugui, Chinese official and chancellor (d. 956)

896

- Al-Masudi, Muslim historian and geographer (approximate date)
- Liu Hua, Chinese princess and wife of Wang Yanjun (d. 930)

897

- Abu al-Faraj al-Isfahani, Arab historian (d. 967)
- Gyeongsun, king of Silla (Korea) (d. 978)
- Balderic, bishop of Utrecht (d. 975)
- Yang Longyan, king of Wu (d. 920)

898

- Fu Yanqing, Chinese general (d. 975)
- He Ning, Chinese chancellor (d. 955)
- Hugh the Great, Father of Hugh Capet and progenitor of the Capetian Kings (approximate date) (d. 956)
- Li Congyan, Chinese general (d. 946)
- Sang Weihan, Chinese chief of staff (d. 947)
- Ngô Quyền, Vietnamese warlord who later became the founder of the Ngô Dynasty (d. 944)

899

- Al-Qahir, Abbasid caliph (d. 950)
- Gonzalo Fernández, count of Castile (d. 915)
- Ma Xifan, king of Chu (d. 947)
- Ma Xisheng, king of Chu (d. 932)
- Wang Zongyan, emperor of Former Shu (d. 926)
- Werner V, Frankish nobleman (approximate date)
- Yelü Bei, prince of the Liao Dynasty (d. 937)

== Deaths ==
890

- February 12 – Henjō, Japanese waka poet (b. 816)
- August 5 – Ranulf II, duke of Aquitaine (b. 850)
- Arib al-Ma'muniyya (July/August) was the poet, singer of the Abbasid Court.
- Æthelhelm, king of Wessex (approximate date)
- Abu Hatim al-Razi, Muslim hadith scholar (b. 811)
- Anandavardhana, Indian philosopher (b. 820)
- Adalard, Frankish nobleman
- Aldalhard II, Frankish nobleman
- Ashot I (the Great), king of Armenia
- Askericus, archbishop of Paris (approximate date)
- Guthrum, Danish Viking king (approximate date)
- Land ingen Dúngaile, princess of Osraige

891

- February 25 – Fujiwara no Mototsune, Japanese regent (b. 836)
- June 2 – Al-Muwaffaq, Abbasid prince and regent (b. 842)
- June 25 – Sunderolt, archbishop of Mainz
- September 14 – Stephen V, pope of the Catholic Church
- October 23 – Yazaman al-Khadim, Abbasid emir
- Bernard, illegitimate son of Charles the Fat (or 892)
- Chen Yan, Chinese warlord and governor
- Enchin, Japanese Buddhist monk (b. 814)
- Gu Yanlang, Chinese warlord and governor
- Isma'il ibn Bulbul, Abbasid official and vizier
- Mutimir of Serbia, ruler of Principality of Serbia
- Wang Hui, chancellor of the Tang Dynasty

892

- August 29 – Theodora of Thessaloniki, Byzantine nun and saint (b. 812)
- October 9 – Al-Tirmidhi, Persian scholar and hadith compiler (b. 824)
- October 15 – Al-Mu'tamid, Muslim caliph of the Abbasid Caliphate
- Berengaudus, Frankish Benedictine monk (b. 840)
- Bernard, illegitimate son of Charles the Fat (or 891)
- Branimir, ruler (knyaz) of Croatia (approximate date)
- Nasr I, Muslim emir of the Samanid Empire
- Sigurd Eysteinsson, Norse Earl of Orkney
- Sun Ru, Chinese warlord and governor
- Yang Shouliang, Chinese warlord and governor
- Zhao Deyin, Chinese warlord and chancellor

893

- April 26 – Chen Jingxuan, general of the Tang dynasty
- May 9 – Shi Pu, warlord of the Tang dynasty
- May 18 – Stephen I, patriarch of Constantinople (b. 867)
- September 18 – Zhang Xiong, Chinese warlord
- December 26 – Masrur al-Balkhi, Muslim general
- Ariwara no Yukihira, Japanese governor (b. 818)
- Aznar II Galíndez, count of Aragon (Spain)
- Bécc mac Airemóin, king of Ulaid (Ireland)
- Du Rangneng, Chinese chancellor (b. 841)
- Li Kuangwei, warlord of the Tang dynasty
- Padla I of Kakheti, Georgian prince
- Photius I, patriarch of Constantinople (approximate date)
- Theodard, archbishop of Narbonne (approximate date)
- Theophano Martiniake, Byzantine empress
- Tian Lingzi, Chinese eunuch commander
- Zhou Yue, Chinese warlord and governor

894

- April 8 – Adalelm, Frankish nobleman
- August 31 – Ahmad ibn Muhammad al-Ta'i, Muslim governor
- December 12 – Guy III, king of Italy and Holy Roman Emperor
- Ali ebn-e Sahl Esfahani, Persian mystic
- Cynemund, bishop of Hereford (approximate date)
- Dae Hyeonseok, king of Balhae (Korea)
- Deng Chuna, Chinese warlord and governor
- Ibn Abi al-Dunya, Muslim scholar
- Kang Junli, general of the Tang Dynasty (b. 847)
- Svatopluk I, ruler (knyaz) of Great Moravia
- Yang Fugong, Chinese eunuch official

895

- May 16 – Qian Kuan, Chinese nobleman
- June 4 – Li Xi, chancellor of the Tang Dynasty
- August 24 – Guthred, king of Northumbria
- October 1 – Kong Wei, chancellor of the Tang Dynasty
- Fujiwara no Yasunori, Japanese nobleman (b. 825)
- Gerolf of Holland, count of Friesland (or 896)
- Hugh, Frankish duke and illegitimate son of Lothair II
- Li Kuangchou, Chinese warlord (approximate date)
- Lu Xisheng, chancellor of the Tang Dynasty
- Minamoto no Tōru, Japanese poet (b. 822)
- Muiredach mac Eochocáin, king of Ulaid (Ireland)
- Wang Chongying, Chinese warlord and governor
- Wang Chucun, general of the Tang Dynasty (b. 831)
- Wang Xingyu, Chinese warlord (approximate date)
- Wei Zhaodu, chancellor of the Tang Dynasty
- Wulfred, bishop of Lichfield (approximate date)

896

- January 18 – Khumarawayh ibn Ahmad ibn Tulun, ruler of the Tulunid Dynasty (b. 864)
- April 4 – Formosus, pope of the Catholic Church
- April – Boniface VI, pope of the Catholic Church
- May 17 – Liu Jianfeng, Chinese warlord
- June 1 – Theodosius Romanus, Syriac Orthodox patriarch of Antioch
- July 3 – Dong Chang, Chinese warlord
- Abu 'l-Asakir Jaysh ibn Khumarawayh, Muslim emir
- Abu Hanifa Dinawari, Muslim botanist and geographer (b. 815)
- Adarnase III, Georgian prince
- Anselm II, archbishop of Milan
- Berengar II, Frankish nobleman
- Cui Zhaowei, chancellor of the Tang Dynasty
- Flann mac Lonáin, Irish poet
- Gerolf of Holland, count of Friesland (or 895)
- Ibn al-Rumi, Muslim poet (b. 836)
- Klonimir, Serbian prince (approximate date)
- Miro the Elder, count of Conflent (Spain)
- Rafi ibn Harthama, ruler of Greater Khorasan
- Rustam I, ruler of the Bavand Dynasty (Iran)
- Sahl al-Tustari, Persian scholar (approximate date)
- Sitriuc mac Ímair, king of Dublin
- Walfred of Friuli, Lombard nobleman

897

- November 16 – Gu Yanhui, Chinese warlord
- Ali ibn Ahmad al-Madhara'i, Muslim vizier
- Buhturi, Muslim poet (b. 820)
- Ermengard of Italy, queen and regent of Provence
- Fujiwara no Sukeyo, Japanese aristocrat (b. 847)
- Guy IV, duke of Spoleto
- Heahstan, bishop of London
- Jinseong, queen of Silla (Korea)
- Li Zi ('Prince of Tong'), prince of the Tang Dynasty
- Mashdotz I, Armenian monk and catholicos (or 898)
- Minamoto no Yoshiari, Japanese official (b. 845)
- Stephen VI, pope of the Catholic Church
- Theodore II, pope of the Catholic Church (b. 840)
- Wilfred the Hairy, Frankish nobleman
- Ya'qubi, Muslim geographer (or 898)
- Zhaozhou, Chinese Zen Buddhist master (b. 778)
- Zhu Xuan, Chinese warlord and governor (jiedushi)

898

- January 1 – Odo I, king of the West Frankish Kingdom
- October 15 – Lambert II, king of Italy and Holy Roman Emperor
- Adalbold I, bishop of Utrecht (approximate date)
- Ahmad ibn Isa al-Shaybani, Muslim leader
- Aitíth mac Laigni, king of Ulaid (Ireland)
- Al-Mubarrad, Muslim grammarian (b. 826)
- Athanasius, bishop and duke of Naples
- Doseon, Korean Buddhist monk (b. 826)
- Gagik Apumrvan Artsruni, Armenian prince
- Hsiang-yen Chih-hsien, Chinese Ch'an master
- Luo Hongxin, Chinese warlord (b. 836)
- Mashdotz I, Armenian monk and catholicos (or 897)
- Stephen, duke of Amalfi (approximate date)
- Wang Chao, Chinese warlord (b. 846)
- Ya'qubi, Muslim geographer (or 897)

899

- July 26 – Li Hanzhi, Chinese warlord (b. 842)
- October 26 – Alfred the Great, king of Wessex (b. 849)
- December 8 – Arnulf of Carinthia, king of the East Frankish Kingdom
- Ahmad ibn al-Tayyib al-Sarakhsi, Persian traveler and historian
- Stylianos Zaoutzes, Byzantine official and minister
- Sumbat I of Klarjeti, Georgian prince
- Wang Gong, Chinese warlord
- Zheng Qi, chancellor of the Tang Dynasty
- Zoe Zaoutzaina, Byzantine empress consort of Leo VI
