= 893 =

Calendar year

893 in various calendars
- Gregorian calendar: 893; DCCCXCIII
- Ab urbe condita: 1646
- Armenian calendar: 342; ԹՎ ՅԽԲ
- Assyrian calendar: 5643
- Balinese saka calendar: 814–815
- Bengali calendar: 299–300
- Berber calendar: 1843
- Buddhist calendar: 1437
- Burmese calendar: 255
- Byzantine calendar: 6401–6402
- Chinese calendar: 壬子年 (Water Rat); 3590 or 3383 — to — 癸丑年 (Water Ox); 3591 or 3384
- Coptic calendar: 609–610
- Discordian calendar: 2059
- Ethiopian calendar: 885–886
- Hebrew calendar: 4653–4654
- Hindu calendars
- Vikram Samvat: 949–950
- Shaka Samvat: 814–815
- Kali Yuga: 3993–3994
- Holocene calendar: 10893
- Iranian calendar: 271–272
- Islamic calendar: 279–280
- Japanese calendar: Kanpyō 5 (寛平５年)
- Javanese calendar: 791–792
- Julian calendar: 893; DCCCXCIII
- Korean calendar: 3226
- Minguo calendar: 1019 before ROC 民前1019年
- Nanakshahi calendar: −575
- Seleucid era: 1204/1205 AG
- Thai solar calendar: 1435–1436
- Tibetan calendar: ཆུ་ཕོ་བྱི་བ་ལོ་ (male Water-Rat); 1019 or 638 or −134 — to — ཆུ་མོ་གླང་ལོ་ (female Water-Ox); 1020 or 639 or −133

Year 893 (DCCCXCIII) was a common year starting on Monday of the Julian calendar.

== Events ==
=== By place ===
==== Europe ====
- Vladimir, ruler (khan) of the Bulgarian Empire, is dethroned by his father Boris I, with help from loyal boyars. He is blinded, and succeeded by his brother Simeon I, as prince of Bulgaria; the capital is moved from Pliska to Preslav. Simeon makes an alliance with the Pechenegs (or Patzinaks), a semi-nomad Turkic tribe from the Central Asian steppes.
- An East Frankish expeditionary force under Zwentibold, the eldest son of King Arnulf of Carinthia, crosses the Alps into Friuli. He makes junction at Verona, with the army of the deposed king Berengar I, and proceeds to lay siege to Pavia. After a three-month campaign, Zwentibold receives orders to head back to Bavaria, in case of a Magyar intervention.
- The 13-year-old Charles III (the Simple), the posthumous son of Louis the Stammerer, is crowned king of the West Frankish Kingdom at the Reims Cathedral—though he is not recognized as such by King Odo (or Eudes) until 898.
- King Alfonso III repopulates the city of Zamora with Mozarabs (Iberian Christians who have lived under Moorish rule) from Toledo in Al-Andalus (modern Spain).
- Galindo II Aznárez succeeds his father Aznar II Galíndez as count of Aragon (until 922).

==== Britain ====
- Spring – Prince Edward, the son of King Alfred the Great, defeats the Danish Viking raiders at Farnham, and forces them to take refuge on Thorney Island. At the same time, Danes from East Anglia sail around the Cornish coast, and besiege Exeter.
- Spring – A Viking army under Hastein moves to a fortified camp at Benfleet (Essex). The Danish camp is captured by the Saxons, while the army is out raiding. Hastein is forced to retreat to Shoebury.
- Summer – Battle of Buttington: A combined Welsh and Mercian army under Lord Æthelred besieges a Viking camp at Buttington in Wales. The Danes escape with heavy losses, and take their families to safety in East Anglia.
- Autumn – Danish Vikings under Hastein take the city of Chester, after a rapid march from East Anglia. Alfred the Great destroys the food supplies, forcing them to move into Wales.
- Asser, bishop of Sherborne, writes his Life of King Alfred in Wessex. He studies for 6 months each year in Alfred's household.

==== Arabian Empire ====
- Spring – Caliph Al-Mu'tadid recognizes Khumarawayh as autonomous emir over Egypt and Syria, in exchange for an annual tribute of 300,000 dinars. The Jazira provinces of Diyar Rabi'a and Diyar Mudar are returned to the Abbasid Caliphate. Muslim forces recover direct control of Mosul (modern Iraq) from the Shayban.

==== Eurasia ====
- March 23 – 893 Ardabil earthquake. Several earthquake catalogues and historical sources describe this earthquake as a destructive earthquake that struck the city of Ardabil, Iran. The magnitude is unknown, but the death toll was reported to be very large. The USGS, in their "List of Earthquakes with 50,000 or More Deaths", give an estimate that 150,000 were killed, which would make it the ninth deadliest earthquake in history.
- December 28 – An earthquake destroys the city of Dvin in Armenia.

=== By topic ===
==== Religion ====
- Council of Preslav: The Byzantine clergy is expelled from Bulgaria, and the Greek language is replaced with Old Bulgarian (also known as Old Church Slavonic), as an official language.
- King Yasovarman I (called the Leper King) of the Khmer Empire (modern Cambodia) dedicates the Lolei Temple of the Roluos group to the god Shiva and the royal family.

== Births ==
- Abu Muhammad al-Hasan, Arab Muslim geographer (d. 945)
- Al-Qa'im bi-Amr Allah, caliph of the Fatimid Caliphate (d. 946)
- Chen Jinfeng, empress consort of Wang Yanjun (d. 935)
- Cunigunda, Frankish noblewoman (approximate date)
- Flodoard, Frankish canon and chronicler (or 894)
- Hamza al-Isfahani, Persian historian (approximate date)
- Li Hao, Chinese official and chancellor (approximate date)
- Louis the Child, king of the East Frankish Kingdom (d. 911)
- Ulrich (or Odalrici), bishop of Augsburg (d. 973)
- William I (Longsword), duke of Normandy (approximate date)
- Wu Cheng, Chinese politician and chancellor (d. 965)

== Deaths ==
- April 26 – Chen Jingxuan, general of the Tang dynasty
- May 9 – Shi Pu, warlord of the Tang dynasty
- May 18 – Stephen I, patriarch of Constantinople (b. 867)
- September 18 – Zhang Xiong, Chinese warlord
- December 26 – Masrur al-Balkhi, Muslim general
- Ariwara no Yukihira, Japanese governor (b. 818)
- Aznar II Galíndez, count of Aragon (Spain)
- Bécc mac Airemóin, king of Ulaid (Ireland)
- Du Rangneng, Chinese chancellor (b. 841)
- Li Kuangwei, warlord of the Tang dynasty
- Padla I of Kakheti, Georgian prince
- Photius I, patriarch of Constantinople (approximate date)
- Theodard, archbishop of Narbonne (approximate date)
- Theophano Martiniake, Byzantine empress
- Tian Lingzi, Chinese eunuch commander
- Zhou Yue, Chinese warlord and governor
