= Ishaq ibn Kundaj =

9th-century Abbasid Commander and Governor

- Died: c. 891 Al-Jazira, Abbasid Caliphate
- Allegiance: Abbasid Caliphate
- Branch: Abbasid Turkic regiment
- Service years: c. 873 – 890
- Conflicts: Zanj Rebellion
- Children: Muhammad

Isḥāq ib Kundāj al-Khazarī (Arabic: إسحاق بن كنداج الخزري) or Kundājīq, was a Turkic military leader who played a prominent role in the turbulent politics of the Abbasid Caliphate in the late 9th century. Initially active in lower Iraq in the early 870s, he came to be appointed governor of Mosul in the Jazira (Upper Mesopotamia, in modern northern Iraq) in 879/80. He ruled Mosul and much of the Jazira almost continuously until his death in 891, despite becoming involved in constant quarrels with local chieftains, as well as in the Abbasid government's rivalry with the Tulunids of Egypt. On his death he was succeeded by his son, Muhammad, but in 892 the Abbasid government under Caliph al-Mu'tadid re-asserted its authority in the region, and Muhammad went to serve in the caliphal court.

== Life ==
Ishaq ibn Kundaj is first mentioned in the histories of al-Tabari and Ibn al-Athir in 873, during the Abbasid campaigns to suppress the Zanj Rebellion. He was tasked with holding Basra against the Zanj rebels, and cutting off supplies to them. In 878/9, along with other senior Turkic generals (Musa ibn Utamish, al-Fadl ibn Musa ibn Bugha, Yanghajur ibn Urkhuz) he secured from the regent al-Muwaffaq, the Caliphate's de facto ruler, the recognition of their power and status as the main military leaders of the Caliphate.

=== Seizure of Mosul ===
Map of the Jazira (Upper Mesopotamia), with its provinces, in medieval times

With the power he had acquired, he turned his gaze in 879 on Mosul in the Jazira (in what is now northern Iraq), an area plagued by rivalries among the Arab tribal chiefs—primarily the various Taghlibi leaders, who succeeded one another as rulers of Mosul—and an ongoing Kharijite rebellion. Ibn Kundaj succeeded in defeating the ruler of Mosul, Ali ibn Dawud, and taking the city. To the local Arab tribes of Taghlib and Bakr, who had been accustomed to wide autonomy from the central government during the "Anarchy at Samarra", the appearance of Ibn Kundaj and his occupation of Mosul represented an unacceptable intrusion. Ibn Kundaj defeated one of them, Ishaq ibn Ayyub, and seized the latter's stronghold of Nisibis, but Ibn Ayyub appealed for aid to the Shaybanid Isa ibn al-Shaykh of Amid and Abu'l-Maghra ibn Musa ibn Zurara of Arzen. The coalition prepared to strike against Ibn Kundaj, but the arrival of emissaries from Baghdad confirming him as governor over Mosul, Diyar Rabi'a and Armenia forced them to back down and agree to pay a tribute of 200,000 gold dinars.

The coalition was soon reformed, however, consisting of Ishaq ibn Ayyub, Isa ibn al-Shayh, Abu al-Maghra, Hamdan ibn Hamdun "and the tribes of Rabi'ah, Taghlib, Bakr and Yaman that were connected with them", according to al-Tabari. Ishaq scored a decisive victory over them in April/May 881, pursuing their remnants to Nisibis and Amid. Many of the defeated leaders, including Hamdan ibn Hamdun, who continued to oppose him, now went over the Kharijite rebels.

=== Arrest of Caliph al-Mu'tamid ===
In 882, the Caliph al-Mu'tamid tried to escape the control of his brother al-Muwaffaq and made contact with Ahmad ibn Tulun, the powerful Turkic general who controlled Egypt, Syria and parts of the southeastern Jazira as well. Although nominally recognizing Abbasid suzerainty, Ibn Tulun was an autonomous ruler, and a rival to al-Muwaffaq. Trusting in Ibn Tulun's pledge of assistance, the Caliph, accompanied by a few trusted aides, left the capital Samarra and went to the Jazira, hoping from there to cross over into Tulunid territory. Ibn Kundaj, who had already received letters from al-Muwaffaq ordering the arrest of the Caliph and his followers, at first presented himself as sympathizing with the Caliph's plight and willing to aid them, but at an opportune moment seized the caliph and his attendants, throwing the latter in chains. After reproaching the Caliph for abandoning his brother who was struggling to save the dynasty and the empire, he sent the caliphal party back to Samarra. Ibn Kundaj was greatly rewarded for this: not only were the estates of the Caliph's companions confiscated and granted to him, but four days after delivering his prisoners to Samarra, on 22 January 883, he was given robes of honour and two ceremonial swords, receiving the title of Dhu al-Sayfayn ("He of the Two Swords"), followed later by more rich gifts and lunches with the grandees of the Abbasid court. At the insistence of al-Muwaffaq, the powerless Caliph was now forced to order the name of Ibn Tulun publicly cursed from the mosques, with all the offices of the latter conferred on Ibn Kundaj. This meant little in practice, as neither the Abbasid government nor Ibn Kundaj possessed the force to wrest Ibn Tulun's territories from him, but, along with his appointment to command the Caliph's private guard (shurtat al-khassa), it made Ibn Kundaj nominally one of the most powerful men of the Caliphate.

=== Wars with the Tulunids and Ibn Abu'l-Saj ===
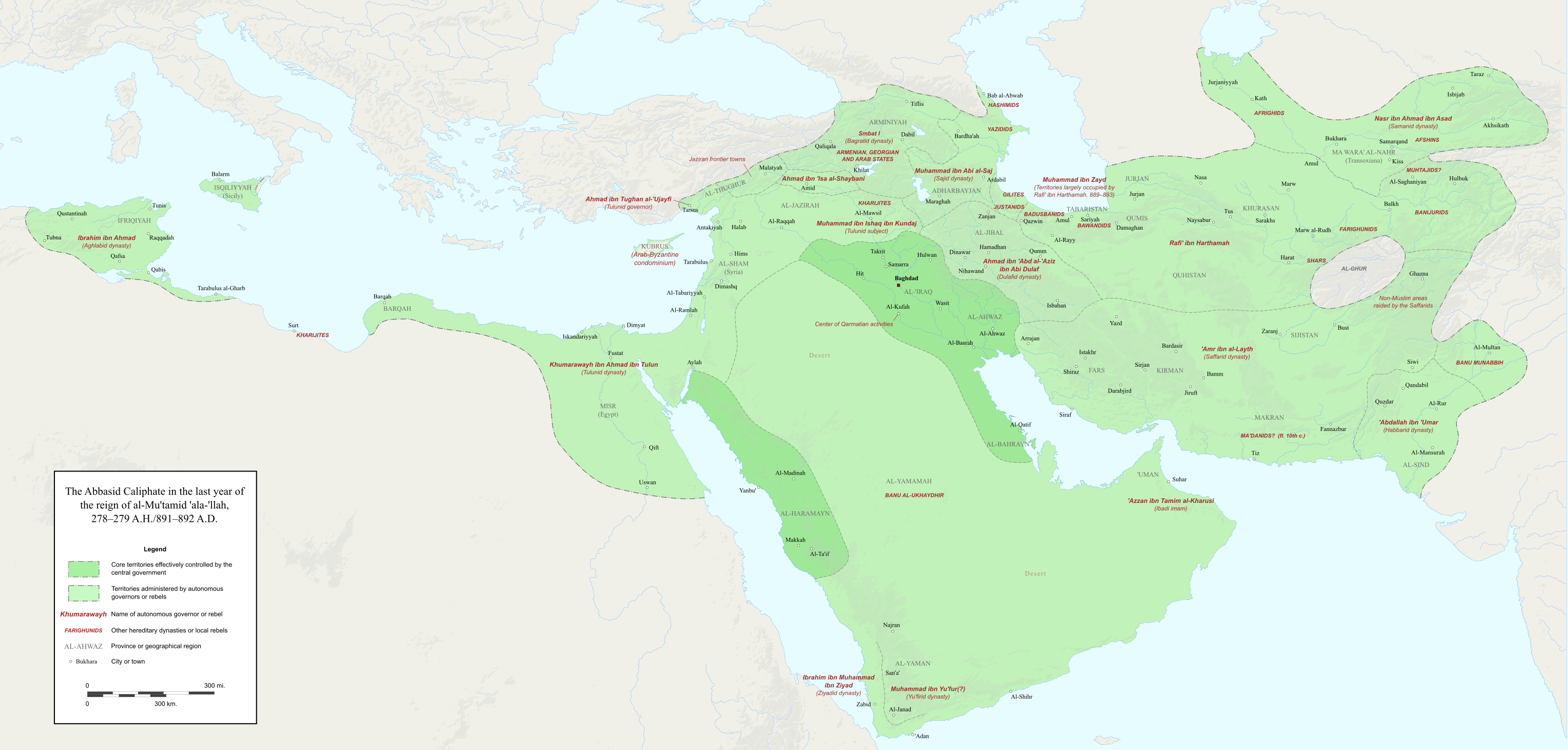
Map of the fragmented Abbasid empire, with areas still under direct control of the Abbasid central government (dark green) and under autonomous rulers (light green) adhering to nominal Abbasid suzerainty, c. 892

Ibn Tulun's death in 884 seemed to present an opportunity to capture some of his territories in Syria from his inexperienced son and heir, Khumarawayh. Ibn Kundaj allied himself with the Abbasid general Ibn Abu'l-Saj, and received authorization and some troops from al-Muwaffaq. Ibn Kundaj clashed with the Tulunid governor of Raqqa in April 884, and soon after, the Tulunid governor of Damascus defected, bringing with him Antioch, Aleppo and Hims. Khumarawayh responded by sending troops to Syria, who soon succeeded in recovering the lost cities, before both sides settled into winter quarters. In the spring, al-Muwaffaq's son, Abu'l-Abbas Ahmad (the future Caliph al-Mu'tadid), arrived to take control. Ahmad and Ibn Kundaj defeated the Tulunids, who were driven back to Palestine, but Ahmad quarrelled with Ibn Kundaj and Ibn Abu'l-Saj, who departed with their troops, and at the Battle of the Mills on 6 April Khumarawayh's general Sa'd al-Aysar routed the Abbasid army. This signalled the end of the alliance between Ibn Kundaj and Ibn Abu'l-Saj: the latter now turned to Khumarawayh, and persuaded him to invade the Jazira. With Egyptian aid, Ibn Abu'l-Saj crossed the Euphrates, defeated Ibn Kundaj's forces in a number of battles in 886–887, and forced him to recognize Tulunid control. The entire Jazira now became a Tulunid province, a fact recognized by the Abbasid government in a treaty in the December 886 that confirmed Khumarawayh in his old and new possessions.

Ibn Kundaj remained as governor of Mosul under Tulunid authority. In 887/8 he tried to rebel but was defeated. Although he re-acknowledged Tulunid suzerainty, he was now stripped of Mosul in favour of Ibn Abu'l-Saj. Ibn Kundaj now concentrated his attentions on defeating his rival, and soon managed to secure the favour and support of Khumarawayh: in 888–889, it was Ibn Kundaj who, at the head of a Tulunid army, defeated and ousted Ibn Abu'l-Saj, who fled to al-Muwaffaq. Ibn Kundaj now returned to his old post at Mosul, which he kept until his death in 891. He was succeeded by his son, Muhammad. The latter soon lost Mosul and the rest of his domains in the Jazira to the resurgent Abbasids under al-Mu'tadid. After a brief stay in the Tulunid court, he entered Abbasid service and rose to become a distinguished general in the caliphal army.

== Sources ==
- Fields, Philip M., ed. (1987). The History of al-Ṭabarī, Volume XXXVII: The ʿAbbāsid Recovery: The War Against the Zanj Ends, A.D. 879–893/A.H. 266–279. SUNY Series in Near Eastern Studies. Albany, New York: State University of New York Press. ISBN 978-0-88706-054-0.
- Haarmann, Ulrich (1986). "K̲h̲umārawayh". In Bosworth, C. E.; van Donzel, E.; Lewis, B. & Pellat, Ch. (eds.). The Encyclopaedia of Islam, Second Edition. Volume V: Khe–Mahi. Leiden: E. J. Brill. pp. 49–50. doi:10.1163/1573-3912_islam_SIM_4328. ISBN 978-90-04-07819-2.
- Kennedy, Hugh (2004) [1986]. The Prophet and the Age of the Caliphates: The Islamic Near East from the 6th to the 11th Century (Second ed.). Harlow: Longman. ISBN 978-0-582-40525-7.
- Sharon, Moshe (2009). Corpus Inscriptionum Arabicarum Palaestinae, Volume 4: G. Handbuch der Orientalistik. 1. Abt.: Der Nahe und der Mittlere Osten. Leiden: BRILL. pp. 11–13. ISBN 978-90-04-17085-8.
- Sobernheim, Moritz (1987). "Khumārawaih". In Houtsma, Martijn Theodoor (ed.). E.J. Brill's First Encyclopaedia of Islam, 1913–1936, Volume IV: 'Itk–Kwaṭṭa. Leiden: BRILL. p. 973. ISBN 978-90-04-08265-6.
- Waines, David, ed. (1992). The History of al-Ṭabarī, Volume XXXVI: The Revolt of the Zanj, A.D. 869–879/A.H. 255–265. SUNY Series in Near Eastern Studies. Albany, New York: State University of New York Press. ISBN 978-0-7914-0763-9.
