= Ibrahim ibn Hamdan =

Ibrahim ibn Hamdan (Arabic: إبراهيم بن حمدان; d. 920/1) was an early member of the Hamdanid dynasty, who served the Abbasid Caliphate as a provincial governor.

He first appears during 908, when his brother, Husayn, was involved in the failed usurpation of Ibn al-Mu'tazz and was pursued by the Abbasid government. Along with the rest of Husayn's brothers, Ibrahim remained loyal to the Abbasids, and negotiated a pardon for Husayn, who was readmitted to Abbasid service. During another revolt of Husayn in 914–915, Ibrahim was suspected of involvement and briefly imprisoned, along with another brother, Abdallah. Released, Ibrahim was appointed governor of the Upper Mesopotamian district of Diyar Rabi'a in 919/20. He died in the next year, and was succeeded by one of his brothers, Dawud.

== Sources ==
- Canard, Marius (1971). "Ḥamdānids". In Lewis, B.; Ménage, V. L.; Pellat, Ch. & Schacht, J. (eds.). The Encyclopaedia of Islam, Second Edition. Volume III: H–Iram. Leiden: E. J. Brill. pp. 126–131. OCLC 495469525.
