= Battle of Dayr al-Aqul =

876 battle in present-day Iraq

| Date | 8 April 876 |
| Location | Istarband, near Dayr al-'Aqul on the Tigris (present-day Wasit Governorate, Iraq) 32°55′N 45°5′E |
| Result | Abbasid victory |

Belligerents
| Abbasid Caliphate | Saffarid dynasty |

Commanders and leaders
| Al-Muwaffaq; Musa ibn Bugha; Masrur al-Balkhi | Ya`qub ibn Laith (WIA); Abi'l-Saj Devdad |

Strength
| 150,000 | 100,000 |

Casualties and losses
| Unknown | 7,000 killed |
- Location within Iraq

The Battle of Dayr al-Aqul was fought on 8 April 876, between forces of the Saffarid ruler Ya'qub ibn Laith and the Abbasid Caliphate. Taking place some 80 km southeast (downstream) of Baghdad, the battle ended in a decisive victory for the Abbasids, forcing Ya'qub to halt his advance into Iraq.

The town of Dayr al-ʿĀqūl (Arabic: دير العاقول, Persian: دیرالعاقول; literally "monastery at the river-bend", from Syriac ʿaqūlā "bend") was the main town of the fertile district (ṭassūj) in central Nahrawan, making it the most important town on the Tigris between Baghdad and Wasit. The battle itself took place near a village of the town's district, called Istarband, between Dayr al-Aqul itself and Sib Bani Kuma.

== Background ==
Ever since the assassination of the caliph al-Mutawakkil in 861, the Abbasid Caliphate had been in a state of turmoil (the "Anarchy at Samarra"). The Turkish military establishment, in an effort to preserve the power of its leaders, began to overthrow any caliph whom they considered unsatisfactory. Between the death of al-Mutawakkil and the ascension of al-Mu'tamid in 870, three caliphs met violent ends. With the Turks exercising unprecedented control over the empire while the finances of the caliphate were increasingly unable to support them, the prestige of the caliphs reached its lowest point thus far.

As the situation in the capital declined, various groups in different parts of the empire took advantage of this period of weakness. In Tabaristan a Zaydi dynasty came to power in 864. In 868 the Turk Ahmad ibn Tulun gained control of Egypt and gradually asserted his independence from Samarra. In Lower Iraq and Khuzistan, the Zanj Rebellion began in 869 and posed a serious threat to the Abbasid Caliphate in the region.

In Iran, meanwhile, the most significant threat against the caliphate came in the form of the Saffarid Ya`qub bin Laith. Ya`qub first came to power in 861 in Sistan, a province which had been held by 'ayyār bands since 854. From there he rapidly expanded, and in 873 he extinguished the rule of the Tahirids, who were governors loyal to the Abbasids, in Khurasan. This left him in control of much of eastern and central Iran plus parts of Afghanistan.

Back in Samarra, reconciliation between the Turks and the caliphs had begun during the reign of al-Mu'tamid (870–892). Al-Mu'tamid's brother, al-Muwaffaq, was the driving force behind this success; he had good relations with the Turkish leaders such as Musa bin Bugha and he gradually gained more and more power until he was the actual administrator of the empire. Musa bin Bugha held the governorships of several of the eastern provinces, but his failure to make any headway against the rebels caused him to resign from these governorships in frustration, after which al-Muwaffaq took over the positions.

The Abbasids were concerned about the threat the Saffarids posed, especially after Ya`qub conquered Fars from Muhammad bin Wasil in 875. From Fars Ya`qub moved on to Khuzistan, taking possession of Ramhurmuz in December of 875. This move put the Saffarid army close to Iraq. It also put Ya`qub close to the Zanj revolt; the Abbasids feared that the Saffarids and Zanj would band together against the caliphate, although Ya`qub's later rejection of an offer by the Zanj to become allies casts doubt on this possibility. In any case it was an alarming development, as the caliph did not feel that he had the resources to stop Ya`qub. All of Ya`qub's supporters in Baghdad, who had been imprisoned in 873 following his conquest of Khurasan, were released, and al-Mu'tamid sent an embassy to Ya`qub to grant him the governorships of Khurasan, Tabaristan, Fars, Gurgan, and Ray, as well as appoint him as head of security in Baghdad.

Ya`qub, sensing that the offer was made due to the weakness of the caliph, rejected it and wrote back that he would be advancing to the capital. The offer also alienated the Turks of Samarra, who felt that Ya`qub represented a threat to their interests. Seeing that an agreement with the Saffarid was impossible, al-Mu'tamid decided upon war and pronounced a formal curse upon Ya`qub. On 7 March 876 he left Samarra, leaving his son al-Mufawwad in charge of the capital. On 15 March he arrived at Baghdad, before arriving near Kalwadha and setting up camp. From there his army marched to Sib Bani Kuma, where al-Mu'tamid's general Masrur al-Balkhi joined him after slowing down Ya`qub's army (see below). While there the caliph gathered more troops to his side.

Map showing the location of the battle, as well as the routes taken by the Saffarid (red) and main 'Abbasid (blue) armies

For his part, Ya`qub traveled through Khuzistan, during which he gained the defection of a former general of the caliph's, Abi'l-Saj Devdad, and entered Iraq. The caliphal general Masrur al-Balkhi managed to slow down his progress by flooding the land outside Wasit, but the Saffarid army was able to get through this and he entered Wasit on 24 March. Leaving Wasit, he set for the town of Dayr al-'Aqul, which was about fifty miles from Baghdad. According to one source, Ya`qub did not actually expect the caliph to offer battle; instead he would give in to any demands that the Saffarid had. Al-Mu'tamid, however, sent al-Muwaffaq to stop him. The two armies met at Istarband, between Dayr al-'Aqul and Sib Bani Kuma.

== Battle ==
The battle took place on 8 April. Before the battle, Ya`qub reviewed his troops, who apparently numbered about ten thousand. The Abbasids, however, had a numerical superiority and the additional advantage of fighting on familiar territory. The center of the Abbasid army was commanded by al-Muwaffaq. Musa bin Bugha had command of the right wing, and Masrur al-Balkhi the left. A final appeal was made to the Saffarids to restore their loyalty to the caliph, and the battle began.

The fighting raged on for most of the day. The Saffarid army was somewhat reluctant to directly fight the caliph and his army. Despite this, there were heavy losses on both sides, and several Abbasid and Saffarid commanders were killed. Ya`qub himself was wounded, but he did not leave the field. As evening approached, reinforcements arrived to support al-Muwaffaq. The mawla Nusayr created a diversion by attacking the Saffarid rear from boats on the Tigris and setting fire to the Saffarid baggage train, giving the Abbasids a further advantage.

Eventually the Saffarid army began to flee from the battle. Ya`qub and his bodyguards continued to fight, but were forced to leave the field as the army retreated, leaving them behind. The caliph had apparently flooded the lands behind the Saffarids before the battle, and this made a retreat difficult; many men drowned attempting to escape the Abbasid army. With the Saffarids making their hasty exit, al-Muwaffaq was able to capture Ya`qub's baggage. Several political prisoners that Ya`qub had brought with him, such as the Tahirid Muhammad bin Tahir, also fell into Abbasid hands and were freed.

== Aftermath ==
The battle completely halted Ya`qub's advance and put an end to what was arguably a major threat to the Abbasid Caliphate. Ya`qub did not make any subsequent campaigns against Iraq. Al-Mu'tamid, following the victory, restored several individuals to their governorships in Iran, such as Muhammad bin Wasil to Fars and Muhammad bin Tahir to Khurasan, but they were unable to enforce their claims against the Saffarids. Ya`qub died three years later, in 879; his brother and successor, 'Amr concluded a peace with the caliph that lasted for a few years. The Abbasids were able to continue to work reasserting their authority in several provinces; the Zanj were defeated in 883, and Egypt and Fars would eventually return to the Abbasid fold.
