= Al-Hasan ibn Ali Kurah =

Al-Ḥasan ibn ʻAlī Kūrah (Arabic: الحسن بن علي كراه) was a military leader of the Abbasid Caliphate under Caliph al-Mu'tadid.

Al-Hasan ibn Ali Kurah first appears in 894/5, during the course of the reimposition of Abbasid authority over the Jibal and Rayy by al-Mu'tadid. According to al-Tabari, he was the agent of the renegade general Rafi ibn Harthama in Rayy, and surrendered to al-Mu'tadid's son Ali (the future al-Muktafi) with a thousand men. In 896, al-Mu'tadid sent him as leader of an expedition against the Kharijite rebels in the Jazira, but he failed to achieve any decisive result.

Sometime in the year 900, he was appointed as governor of the Cilician border zone (ath-thughur ash-Shamiya) with the Byzantine Empire. In November of the same year, he participated in al-Mu'tadid's pursuit of the eunuch Wasif in the border regions, while in 901, he dispatched his deputy Nizar ibn Muhammad for a raid into Byzantine territory, from which the latter returned with many prisoners and booty, including 160 priests and many crosses and flags.

Following the death of al-Mu'tadid and the falling out of the new caliph al-Muktafi and the commander-in-chief Badr al-Mu'tadidi in June/July 902, al-Hasan was sent with an army to Wasit, where Badr had sought refuge. In the event, abandoned by his followers, Badr was tricked into accepting a caliphal pardon and was murdered on his way to meet with al-Muktafi.

== Sources ==
- Lilie, Ralph-Johannes; Ludwig, Claudia; Pratsch, Thomas; Zielke, Beate (2013). Prosopographie der mittelbyzantinischen Zeit Online. Berlin-Brandenburgische Akademie der Wissenschaften. Nach Vorarbeiten F. Winkelmanns erstellt (in German). Berlin and Boston: De Gruyter.
- Rosenthal, Franz, ed. (1985). The History of al-Ṭabarī, Volume XXXVIII: The Return of the Caliphate to Baghdad: The Caliphates of al-Muʿtaḍid, al-Muktafī and al-Muqtadir, A.D. 892–915/A.H. 279–302. SUNY Series in Near Eastern Studies. Albany, New York: State University of New York Press. ISBN 978-0-87395-876-9.
