= 892 =

Calendar year

892 in various calendars
- Gregorian calendar: 892; DCCCXCII
- Ab urbe condita: 1645
- Armenian calendar: 341; ԹՎ ՅԽԱ
- Assyrian calendar: 5642
- Balinese saka calendar: 813–814
- Bengali calendar: 298–299
- Berber calendar: 1842
- Buddhist calendar: 1436
- Burmese calendar: 254
- Byzantine calendar: 6400–6401
- Chinese calendar: 辛亥年 (Metal Pig); 3589 or 3382 — to — 壬子年 (Water Rat); 3590 or 3383
- Coptic calendar: 608–609
- Discordian calendar: 2058
- Ethiopian calendar: 884–885
- Hebrew calendar: 4652–4653
- Hindu calendars
- Vikram Samvat: 948–949
- Shaka Samvat: 813–814
- Kali Yuga: 3992–3993
- Holocene calendar: 10892
- Iranian calendar: 270–271
- Islamic calendar: 278–279
- Japanese calendar: Kanpyō 4 (寛平４年)
- Javanese calendar: 790–791
- Julian calendar: 892; DCCCXCII
- Korean calendar: 3225
- Minguo calendar: 1020 before ROC 民前1020年
- Nanakshahi calendar: −576
- Seleucid era: 1203/1204 AG
- Thai solar calendar: 1434–1435
- Tibetan calendar: ལྕགས་མོ་ཕག་ལོ་ (female Iron-Boar); 1018 or 637 or −135 — to — ཆུ་ཕོ་བྱི་བ་ལོ་ (male Water-Rat); 1019 or 638 or −134

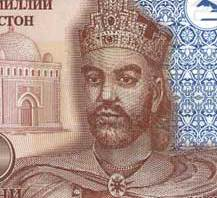
Emir Isma'il ibn Ahmad (849–907)

Year 892 (DCCCXCII) was a leap year starting on Saturday of the Julian calendar, the 892nd year of the Common Era (CE) and Anno Domini (AD) designations, the 892nd year of the 1st millennium, the 92nd year of the 9th century, and the 3rd year of the 890s decade.

== Events ==
=== By place ===
==== Europe ====
- Summer – Poppo II, duke of Thuringia (Central Germany), is deposed by King Arnulf of Carinthia. East Frankish forces and their Magyar (Hungarian) allies invade Great Moravia.
- Vladimir, ruler (knyaz) of the Bulgarian Empire, signs a military alliance with Arnulf of Carinthia of the East Frankish Kingdom. This alliance works against the pro-Byzantine policy of his father.

==== Britain ====
- Autumn – A Viking force with a fleet of 250 longships arrives at the river mouth of the settlement of Lympne (East Kent). They attack the small fortification (called Eorpeburnan).
- Viking raiders (80 ships) under Hastein arrive in the Thames Estuary, and set up camp at Middleton. King Alfred the Great decides to position his army in the Wealden Forest.

==== Arabian Empire ====
- April – Al-Mu'tadid, the de facto regent of the Abbasid Caliphate, removes his cousin Al-Mufawwad from succession. He becomes caliph himself, after the death of Al-Mu'tamid, returning the capital from Samarra to Baghdad.
- May – Ibrahim II, Aghlabid emir of Ifriqiya, sends a large army to Palermo, to impose Arab authority from Kairouan. After an uprising, the Sicilians make a bid for independence.
- Summer – The Persian nobility installs Isma'il ibn Ahmad, the former governor of Transoxiana, as ruler (emir) of the Samanid Empire, after the death of his brother Nasr I.

==== Asia ====
- Former Silla general Kyŏn Hwŏn seizes the cities of Wansanju and Mujinju, taking over the territory of Baekje. He wins the support of the people, and declares himself king.
- Bagratid Armenia conquers Dwin City from the Arabs.

== Births ==
- March 30 – Shi Jingtang, founder of the Later Jin Dynasty (d. 942)
- Ai (Li Zhou), emperor (puppet ruler) of the Tang Dynasty (d. 908)
- Ali ibn Buya, founder of the Buyid Dynasty (or 891)
- Dou Zhengu, Chinese official and chancellor (d. 969)
- Guibert, founder of Gembloux Abbey (d. 962)
- Jing Yanguang, Chinese general and governor (d. 947)
- Saadia Gaon, Jewish philosopher and exegete (or 882)
- Wang Sitong, Chinese general and governor (d. 934)
- Wang Yuanying, crown prince of Former Shu (d. 913)
- Zhang, empress consort of Zhu Youzhen (d. 915)

== Deaths ==
- August 29 – Theodora of Thessaloniki, Byzantine nun and saint (b. 812)
- October 9 – Al-Tirmidhi, Persian scholar and hadith compiler (b. 824)
- October 15 – Al-Mu'tamid, Muslim caliph of the Abbasid Caliphate
- Berengaudus, Frankish Benedictine monk (b. 840)
- Bernard, illegitimate son of Charles the Fat (or 891)
- Branimir, ruler (knyaz) of Croatia (approximate date)
- Nasr I, Muslim emir of the Samanid Empire
- Sigurd Eysteinsson, Norse Earl of Orkney
- Sun Ru, Chinese warlord and governor
- Yang Shouliang, Chinese warlord and governor
- Zhao Deyin, Chinese warlord and chancellor
