= Muflih al-Turki =

Muflih al-Turki (Arabic: مفلح التركي, died April 2, 872) was a Turkish military officer of the Abbasid Caliphate in the mid-9th century. He played a prominent role in the events known as the Anarchy at Samarra and was later killed in battle against the Zanj rebels of southern Iraq.

== Career ==
Muflih was a close associate of the general Musa ibn Bugha al-Kabir, possibly serving as his chief lieutenant. He is first mentioned by the chronicler al-Tabari during the civil war of 865–866, in which he was a member of the army that besieged Baghdad. After the war, he followed Musa to Jibal when the latter was appointed governor there in 867. During his time in Jibal he served as Musa's second in command and undertook several military expeditions, defeating the Dulafid ruler Abd al-Aziz ibn Abu Dulaf near Hamadhan and al-Karaj and attacking the inhabitants of Qumm.

In 869, Muflih entered the province of Tabaristan, which was controlled by the Zaydid rebel al-Hasan ibn Zayd. He was able to defeat al-Hasan and occupy both Sari and Amul. He then set out for the region of Daylam, where al-Hasan had fled to, but he was recalled en route by Musa, who had decided to depart for the capital Samarra. He therefore abandoned Tabaristan, allowing al-Hasan to restore his rule there.

Following their return to Samarra, Muflih was an important supporter of Musa during the short reign of the caliph al-Muhtadi (r. 869–870). He participated in the downfall of the rival general Salih ibn Wasif and was thought to be involved in a plot to depose the caliph. In 870 Musa, Muflih and Bayakbak departed for Upper Mesopotamia, where they fought the Kharijite rebel leader Musawir and forced him to flee. While in Upper Mesopotamia, Musa and Muflih learned that al-Muhtadi was plotting to relieve them of their commands and have them arrested or killed, so they abandoned the campaign and advanced toward Samarra with their troops. During the resulting crisis, al-Muhtadi was deposed and killed, and the two commanders were able to return to the capital.

Shortly after the ascension of al-Mu'tamid (r. 870–892), Muflih returned to al-Jazira to fight Musawir; he succeeded in forcing the rebel to temporarily abandon al-Haditha, but was unable to kill or capture him and eventually returned to Samarra. Around the beginning of 872 he headed for Takrit, where he fought some Arab tribesmen that were reportedly sympathetic to Musawir.

In February 872 Muflih and the caliph's brother Abu Ahmad ibn al-Mutawakkil decided to undertake a campaign against the Zanj and set out for Basra. On April 1 they engaged the Zanj in the vicinity of the Abu al-Khasib Canal, but Muflih was mortally wounded by an arrow that struck him in the temple, and the government army was routed. Muflih died of his wound on the following morning, after which his body was taken to Samarra and buried there. Following his death, his son Abd al-Rahman seems to have assumed his position as one of Musa's chief officers.
