= 894 =

Calendar year

894 in various calendars
Gregorian calendar	894; DCCCXCIV
Ab urbe condita	1647
Armenian calendar	343; ԹՎ ՅԽԳ
Assyrian calendar	5644
Balinese saka calendar	815–816
Bengali calendar	300–301
Berber calendar	1844
Buddhist calendar	1438
Burmese calendar	256
Byzantine calendar	6402–6403
Chinese calendar	癸丑年 (Water Ox); 3591 or 3384 — to — 甲寅年 (Wood Tiger); 3592 or 3385
Coptic calendar	610–611
Discordian calendar	2060
Ethiopian calendar	886–887
Hebrew calendar	4654–4655
- Hindu calendars
Vikram Samvat	950–951
Shaka Samvat	815–816
Kali Yuga	3994–3995
Holocene calendar	10894
Iranian calendar	272–273
Islamic calendar	280–281
Japanese calendar	Kanpyō 6 (寛平６年)
Javanese calendar	792–793
Julian calendar	894; DCCCXCIV
Korean calendar	3227
Minguo calendar	1018 before ROC 民前1018年
Nanakshahi calendar	−574
Seleucid era	1205/1206 AG
Thai solar calendar	1436–1437
Tibetan calendar	ཆུ་མོ་གླང་ལོ་ (female Water-Ox); 1020 or 639 or −133 — to — ཤིང་ཕོ་སྟག་ལོ་ (male Wood-Tiger); 1021 or 640 or −132

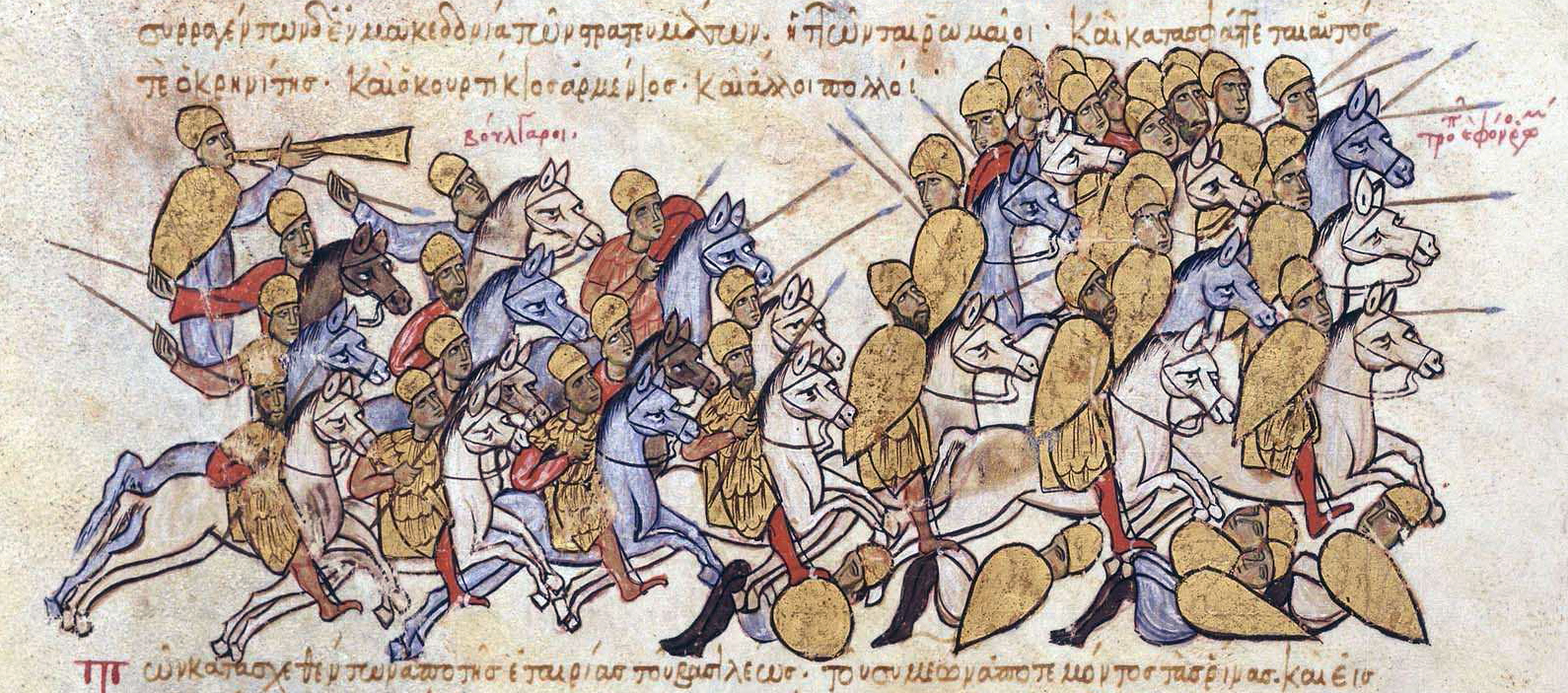
Simeon I invades the Byzantine Empire

Year 894 (DCCCXCIV) was a common year starting on Tuesday of the Julian calendar.

== Events ==
=== By place ===
==== Byzantine Empire ====
- Byzantine–Bulgarian War: Stylianos Zaoutzes, leading minister and basileopator, convinces Emperor Leo VI (the Wise) to move the Bulgarian market from Constantinople to Thessaloniki. This affects the commercial importance of Bulgarian trade. Simeon I, ruler (khan) of the Bulgarian Empire, mobilizes his Bulgarian forces and invades Byzantine territory, ravaging the countryside.

==== Europe ====
- Spring – King Arnulf of Carinthia invades Italy at the head of an East Frankish expeditionary army, joining up with the deposed king Berengar I at Verona. He conquers Brescia after little resistance, and sacks Bergamo after a one-month siege. The cities of Milan and Pavia open their doors to Arnulf. Emperor Guy III escapes from Pavia, to hide in the mountains of Spoleto (Umbria).
- March – Arnulf of Carinthia proceeds to Piacenza, and from there invades central Italy. After a successful campaign, he calls the invasion off and returns to Pavia – probably because Duke Rudolph I of Burgundy was threatening to invade Lorraine. Arnulf has himself proclaimed King of Italy at Pavia, leaving Berengar I as his vice-regent in Italy.
- Arnulf of Carinthia returns to Germany through the Alps, harried by militias dispatched by Rudolph I of Burgundy and margrave Anscar I of Ivrea. Only with much difficulty is Arnulf able to get his army through the Aosta Valley and through St. Moritz, back into Germany. Guy III descends from the Apennines, and re-seizes the Italian kingdom.
- December – Guy III dies after a 4-year reign, and is succeeded by his 14-year-old son Lambert, already associated as co-emperor since 892. At the pleading of Archbishop Fulk of Reims, Pope Formosus reconciles with the young emperor. Lambert proceeds from Spoleto to Pavia, where he is acclaimed and crowned with the Iron Crown of Lombardy.
- Svatopluk I, ruler (knyaz) of Great Moravia, dies after a 34-year reign, in which he has united the Slavic tribes in his kingdom. He is succeeded by his eldest son Mojmir II. The Principality of Nitra (modern-day Slovakia) is given as an appanage to his brother Svatopluk II.
- Árpád, head of the confederation of the Hungarian tribes, comes to an agreement with the prince of the Moravians, Svatopluk II, that Hungarian and Moravian armies will together expel the Eastern Franks from Pannonia.
- Prince Petar of Serbia defeats his revolting cousin Bran; he is captured and blinded (according to a Byzantine tradition that meant to disqualify a person from taking the throne).

==== Britain ====
- The Vikings in Northumbria and East Anglia swear allegiance and hand over hostages to King Alfred the Great, but promptly break their truce by attacking the southwest of England. A Viking force returns from Exeter and sails along the coast, in an attempt to plunder Chichester. They are defeated by the Saxon garrison, losing many ships and men.
- King Anarawd of Gwynedd's shaky alliance with the Vikings collapses. His kingdom is ravaged by the Norsemen. Anarawd is forced to ask for help from Alfred the Great and submits to his overlordship. Alfred imposes oppressive terms and forces Anarawd's confirmation in the Christian Church, with Alfred as 'godfather'.
- Autumn – Battle of Benfleet: Danish Viking forces retire to Essex, after being deprived of food by Alfred the Great (see 893). They draw their longships up the Thames and into the Lea, entrenching themselves at Benfleet.

==== Japan ====
- Emperor Uda orders commercial relations (called Imperial Japanese embassies to China) to cease with China (approximate date).

== Births ==
- Æthelstan, king of England (approximate date)
- Emma, queen of the West Frankish Kingdom (d. 934)
- Flodoard, Frankish canon and chronicler (or 893)
- Michael Maleinos, Byzantine nobleman and monk (d. 963)
- Matilda of Ringelheim, queen of Germany (approximate date)
- Minamoto no Tsunemoto, Japanese prince and samurai (d. 961)
- Ono no Michikaze, Japanese calligrapher (d. 966)

== Deaths ==
- April 8 – Adalelm, Frankish nobleman
- August 31 – Ahmad ibn Muhammad al-Ta'i, Muslim governor
- December 12 – Guy III, king of Italy and Holy Roman Emperor
- Ali ebn-e Sahl Esfahani, Persian mystic
- Cynemund, bishop of Hereford (approximate date)
- Dae Hyeonseok, king of Balhae (Korea)
- Deng Chuna, Chinese warlord and governor
- Ibn Abi al-Dunya, Muslim scholar
- Kang Junli, general of the Tang Dynasty (b. 847)
- Svatopluk I, ruler (knyaz) of Great Moravia
- Yang Fugong, Chinese eunuch official
