= 818 =

Calendar year

818 in various calendars
Gregorian calendar	818; DCCCXVIII
Ab urbe condita	1571
Armenian calendar	267; ԹՎ ՄԿԷ
Assyrian calendar	5568
Balinese saka calendar	739–740
Bengali calendar	224–225
Berber calendar	1768
Buddhist calendar	1362
Burmese calendar	180
Byzantine calendar	6326–6327
Chinese calendar	丁酉年 (Fire Rooster); 3515 or 3308 — to — 戊戌年 (Earth Dog); 3516 or 3309
Coptic calendar	534–535
Discordian calendar	1984
Ethiopian calendar	810–811
Hebrew calendar	4578–4579
- Hindu calendars
Vikram Samvat	874–875
Shaka Samvat	739–740
Kali Yuga	3918–3919
Holocene calendar	10818
Iranian calendar	196–197
Islamic calendar	202–203
Japanese calendar	Kōnin 9 (弘仁９年)
Javanese calendar	714–715
Julian calendar	818; DCCCXVIII
Korean calendar	3151
Minguo calendar	1094 before ROC 民前1094年
Nanakshahi calendar	−650
Seleucid era	1129/1130 AG
Thai solar calendar	1360–1361
Tibetan calendar	མེ་མོ་བྱ་ལོ་ (female Fire-Bird); 944 or 563 or −209 — to — ས་ཕོ་ཁྱི་ལོ་ (male Earth-Dog); 945 or 564 or −208

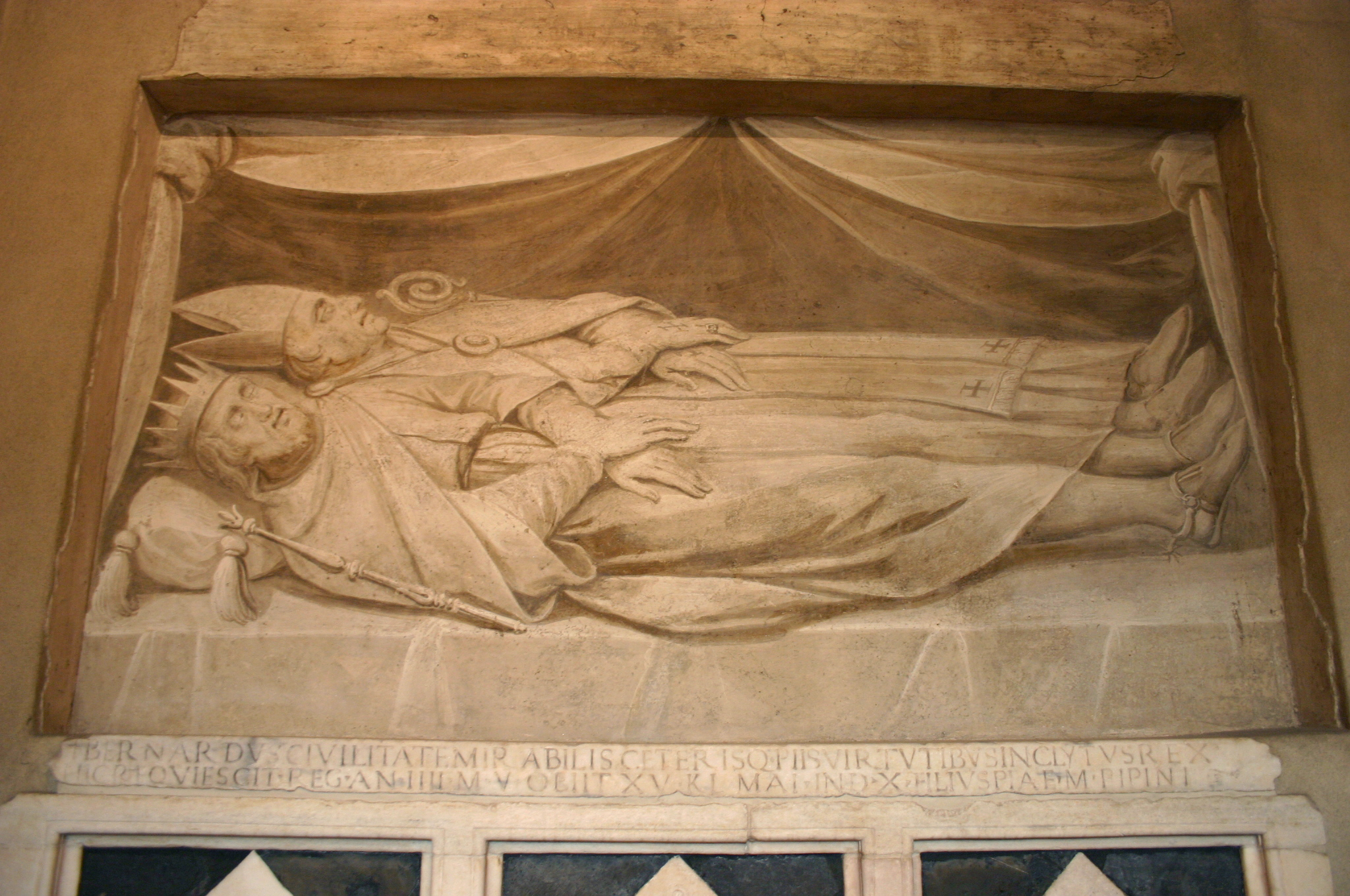
Fresco of king Bernard of Italy (797–818)

Year 818 (DCCCXVIII) was a common year starting on Friday of the Julian calendar. The designation "818" for this year has been used since the early medieval period, when the Anno Domini calendar era became the dominant method of naming years in Europe.

== Events ==
=== By place ===
==== Byzantine Empire ====
Vikings, identified as the Rus' people (a group of Norsemen), plunder the northern coast of Anatolia (modern-day Turkey), marking the first recorded raid of Rus' people on Byzantine territory.

==== Europe ====
- April 17 – King Bernard of Italy, illegitimate son of Pepin of Italy, is tried and condemned to death by Emperor Louis I. The Kingdom of Italy is reabsorbed into the Frankish Empire.

The Slavs known as the Timočani, living along the Timok River, end their alliance with the Bulgars. Duke Ljudevit of the Slavs in Lower Pannonia sends emissaries to Louis I, to assert his independence from the Franks.

- Al-Andalus: A grave rebellion breaks out in the suburbs of Cordoba, against the Emirate of Córdoba. Andalucian Arab refugees arrive in Fez (modern Morocco).

==== Britain ====
- The Anglo-Saxons, led by King Coenwulf of Mercia, raid Dyfed in Wales (approximate date).

==== Asia ====
- Beginning of the Lemro period: The Sambawa and Pyinsa Kingdoms are founded in present-day Myanmar.

=== By topic ===
==== Religion ====
- Theodulf, bishop of Orléans, is deposed and imprisoned, after becoming involved in a conspiracy with Bernard of Italy.

== Births ==
- Abu Dawud, Muslim hadith compiler (or 817)
- Al-Fath ibn Khaqan, Muslim governor (or 817)
- Ariwara no Yukihira, Japanese governor (d. 893)
- Pepin, count of Vermandois (approximate date)
- Sahl al-Tustari, Persian scholar (approximate date)

== Deaths ==
- April 17 – Bernard of Italy, king of the Lombards (b. 797)
- October 3 – Ermengarde, queen of the Franks
- Al-Fadl ibn Sahl, Persian vizier
- Ali al-Ridha, 8th Shia Imam (b. 766)
- Cernach mac Congalaig, king of Brega (Ireland)
- Clement, Irish scholar and saint
- Felix, bishop of Urgell (Spain)
- García I Jiménez, duke of Gascony
- Hildebold, archbishop of Cologne
- Michael the Confessor, bishop of Synnada
- Morman, chieftain and king of Brittany
- Muiredach mac Brain, king of Leinster (Ireland)
- Theophanes the Confessor, Byzantine monk (or 817)
- Quan Deyu, chancellor of the Tang dynasty (b. 759)
- Yahya ibn Adam, Islamic scholar
- Yuan Zi, general of the Tang dynasty (b. 739)
