= Muhammad ibn Ishaq ibn Kundaj =

Abbasid General in 10th century

Muhammad ibn Ishaq ibn Kundaj (Arabic: محمد بن إسحاق بن كنداج) was a prominent general of the Abbasid Caliphate in the early 10th century.

== Life ==
He was the son of Ishaq ibn Kundaj, a Turkic strongman who had established himself, with sanction from the Abbasid court, as the ruler of Mosul in 879. Ishaq ruled Mosul and parts of the Jazira almost uninterruptedly until his death in 891, when he was succeeded by Muhammad. Already in the next year, however, he was driven from Mosul by a rival strongman, Ahmad ibn Isa al-Shaybani. In 893, the new Caliph al-Mu'tadid campaigned in the Jazira, aiming to re-establish direct caliphal control over the region. The Caliph seized Mosul and appointed his own governor there over much of the Jazira. Ahmad retreated to Amid, while Muhammad fled to the Tulunids in Palestine.

After the assassination of the Tulunid ruler Khumarawayh in 896, Muhammad was among those members of the court who tried to assassinate Khumarawayh's successor, Jaysh. The plot was betrayed to Jaysh, and on the very same day, they fled into the desert, leaving their families and property behind. The party crossed the Syrian Desert, losing a few to thirst, and arrived in Kufa, from where they sought asylum with al-Mu'tadid. The Caliph welcomed them and allowed them to enter his service (July 896).

Muhammad now became one of the senior members of the Abbasid court, in both civilian and military positions. In 902, after al-Mu'tadid's death, he was one of the senior subalterns of the Abbasid commander-in-chief, Badr al-Mu'tadidi. When the vizier al-Qasim ibn Ubayd Allah slandered Badr and sought to bring about his execution, Muhammad played a role in calming Badr's fears and persuading him of the sincerity of a guarantee of safe passage for Baghdad. On the way, Badr was killed by one of the Caliph's pages. In 903/4 Muhammad was among the leading officers in the campaigns against the Qarmatians, and in June 906 he led the army that drove them from the town of Hit. In 912 he was made governor of Basra.

== Sources ==
- Kennedy, Hugh (2004). The Prophet and the Age of the Caliphates: The Islamic Near East from the 6th to the 11th Century (Second ed.). Harlow: Longman. ISBN 978-0-582-40525-7.
- Rosenthal, Franz, ed. (1985). The History of al-Ṭabarī, Volume XXXVIII: The Return of the Caliphate to Baghdad: The Caliphates of al-Muʿtaḍid, al-Muktafī and al-Muqtadir, A.D. 892–915/A.H. 279–302. SUNY Series in Near Eastern Studies. Albany, New York: State University of New York Press. ISBN 978-0-87395-876-9.
- Sharon, Moshe (2009). Corpus Inscriptionum Arabicarum Palaestinae, Volume 4: G. Handbuch der Orientalistik. 1. Abt.: Der Nahe und der Mittlere Osten. Leiden: BRILL. ISBN 978-90-04-17085-8.
