= Eorpeburnan =

Place identified in the Burghal Hidage

A map of places named in the Burghal Hidage

Eorpeburnan is the first place identified in the Burghal Hidage, a document created in the late 9th or early 10th century, that provides a list of thirty one fortified places in Wessex. It details the location of fortifications designed to defend the West Saxon kingdom from the Vikings but also the relative size of burghal defences and their garrisons. Eorpeburnan is designated as having a hidage of 324, its precise location is lost in history, but scholars have suggested some possible sites.

== Background ==
Eorpeburnan is the first of thirty one fortified places (burhs (Note: Burh does not mean fortified town per se. Anglo-Saxons used the word to denote any place within a boundary which could include private fortifications or simply a place with a hedge or fence round it.)) in the ancient Kingdom of Wessex, that is listed on a document that has come to be known as the Burghal Hidage. (Note: The Burghal Hidage comprises seven manuscript texts, none of which lists all the burhs. There is actually a total of thirty three burhs listed, but some are in Mercia not Wessex.) The Burghal Hidage was created in the late 9th or early 10th century and was so named by Frederic William Maitland in 1897.

The network of burhs, listed in the Burghal Hidage, was part of Alfred the Great's response to a series of raids and invasions by the Vikings.

The location of the burhs were chosen to defend the main road and river routes into Wessex from Viking attack. They were also a place of refuge, being sited such that any of the Anglo-Saxon rural population would be no more than 20 miles (32 km) from their nearest burh. In addition the burhs became secure regional market centres and a place to mint coins, particularly after 973 when the coinage was reminted every five years or so.

== Name ==
Eorpe~ the first element of the name Eorpeburnan is possibly a personal name or the Old English for dark and the ~burnan probably means stream.

== Modern location of Eorpeburnan ==
Although the location of Eorpeburnan is not known for sure, the various fortifications in the hidage are approximately 40 miles apart and they are listed, in a clockwise direction, around Wessex with Eorpeburnan being the first. Thus the location for Eorpeburnan can be approximated.

The Anglo-Saxon Chronicle records that in the year 892 a "great host of the Danes came up into the estuary of the Limen , (Note: The River Limen is now known as the River Rother) with two hundred and fifty ships" and how they stormed a half finished fortress. (Note: ASC 892)

=== Castle Toll ===
It has been posited by some historians that the half finished fort, described by the chronicle, is Castle Toll, Newenden, Kent. However, other historians have argued against Castle Toll being Eorpeburnan for the following reasons:

- The Burghal hidage does not provide for the defence of Kent. (Note: Although in Kent, Newenden is on the county border between Sussex and Kent.)
- The River Limen would have been too narrow for the Viking warships at Castle Toll.
- The position of Castle Toll is relatively inaccessible and would not have provided any of the usual strategic advantages of a Burh, also an archaeological excavation indicated that the construction of the fort was not typical of Anglo-Saxon works.

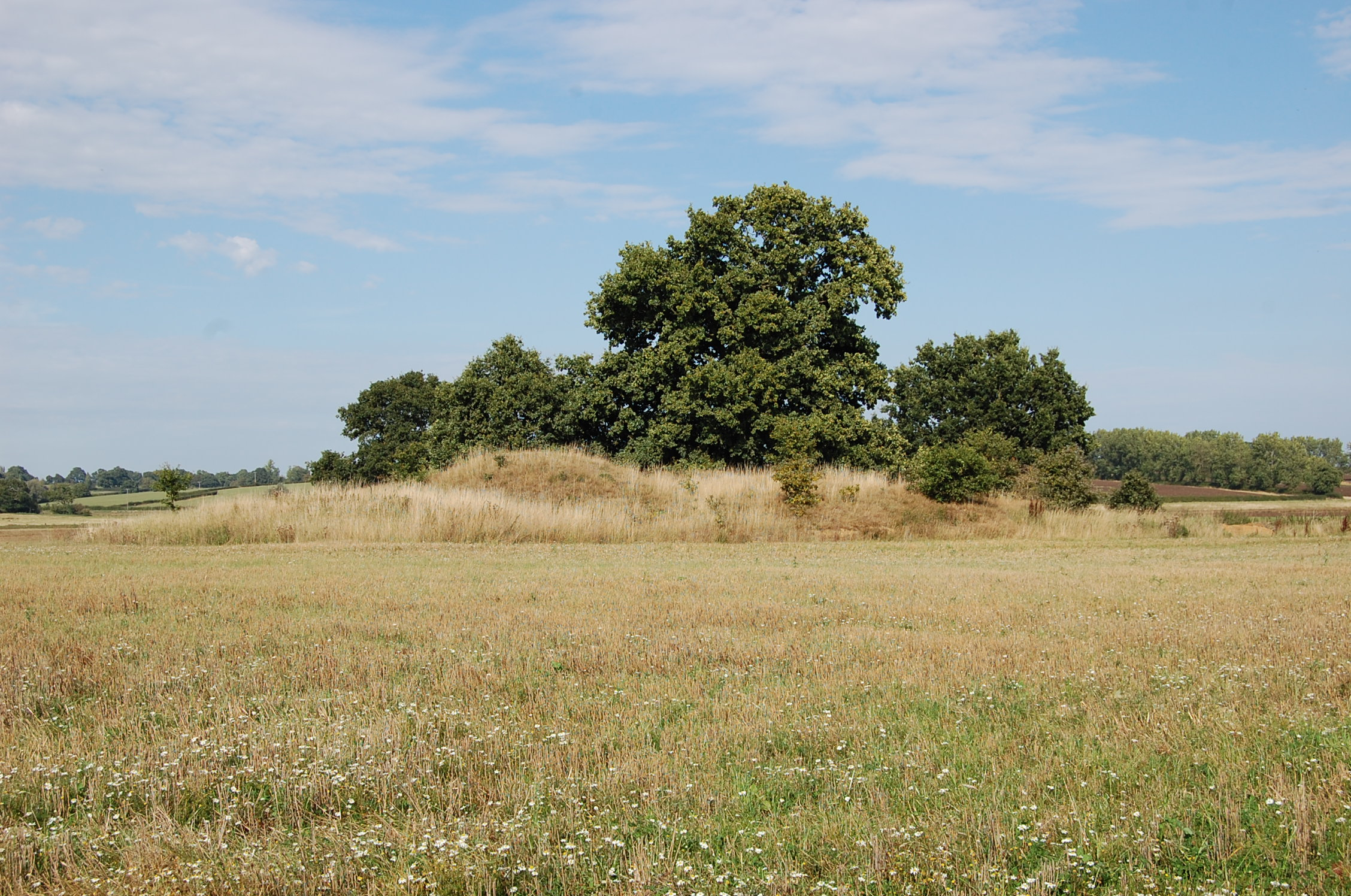
Site of Castle Toll

=== Rye ===
The town of Rye has also been suggested as the site of Eorpeburnan. Rye is in Sussex and the hidage makes provision for the defence of Sussex. The second location listed in the Burghal Hidage is westwards of Rye at Hastings. However, there has been little evidence of Anglo-Saxon occupation in Rye. (Note: Two Anglo-Saxon coins have been found that would provide some evidence that Rye had developed as an urban centre.) An excavation in the 1980s revealed the remains of a ditch, although it was not possible to date it. A more extensive survey was carried out in the 19th century in the town ditch area, when more of the archaeology was intact. It has been possible to deduce the length of wall for each of the listed burhs based on the figures provided by the hidage. The length of the town ditch, in Rye, equates well to the hidage, listed for Eorpeburnan.
