= 893 Dvin earthquake =

Earthquake in Armenia

- Location within Armenia
- Local date: 28 December 893
- Local time: Midnight
- Magnitude: 5.3–6.0 or ≥7.0
- Epicenter: Dvin; 40.0°N 44.6°E
- Areas affected: Armenia
- Max. intensity: MMI IX (Violent)–MMI X (Extreme)
- Casualties: 30,000

The 893 Dvin earthquake occurred on 28 December 893 at around midnight. It had a magnitude of approximately 6 and a maximum intensity of approximately IX (Violent) on the Mercalli intensity scale. It destroyed the city of Dvin in Armenia, causing approximately 30,000 casualties.

The earthquake is sometimes referred to as the 893 Ardabil earthquake. Although the 893 Ardabil earthquake appears in several catalogues the event may not have happened. The similarity of the Arabic name for Dvin, 'Dabil' to Ardabil in northwestern Iran, may have caused confusion in written records. The Ardabil area is prone to numerous earthquakes and was struck by a major earthquake in 1997.

== Tectonic setting ==
Southern Armenia lies within the complex zone of continental collision between the Arabian plate and the Eurasian plate, which extends from the Bitlis-Zagros belt in the south to the Greater Caucasus Mountains, the Apsheron-Balkan Sill and the Kopet Dag mountains in the north. In Armenia the collision is strongly oblique with a large dextral (right lateral) strike-slip component. The Sardarapat-Nakhicheven fault system is formed of four left-stepping fault segments, the Kagyzman, Sardarapat, Parackar-Dvin and Nakhichevan faults. Movement on the Parackar-Dvin segment of this fault system has been associated with a series of large earthquakes in the second half of the 9th century.

== Earthquake characteristics ==
The magnitude of this earthquake has been given as 5.3 and 6, although a value of 7 or greater has been suggested. The main shock was followed by five days of damaging aftershocks. The intensity is estimated to be at least IX on the Mercalli intensity scale, with some seismologists suggesting that X would be a more appropriate value.

== Damage ==
The city was devastated with most of its buildings destroyed, including its defensive walls, the palace of the catholicos and all the other monumental buildings; just 100 houses were left standing. The area damaged included the Artashat Plateau, where landslides were triggered. The Bishop of R'shtunik, Grigor, who was at a mountain retreat was killed with several of his followers. The death toll is variously reported as 20,000, 30,000, 70,000, 82,000, 150,000 and 180,000 in historical sources.

== Aftermath ==
The earthquake had ruined the city's defenses and Dvin was taken by Muhammad ibn Abi'l-Saj, the Sajid emir of Adharbayjan, who turned it into a military base. Although the capital of Armenia was moved to Ani in 961, Dvin became prosperous once more in the 10th century following its reconstruction.

== Confusion over the location and date ==
There has been much confusion over the location and date of this earthquake. Several Armenian sources place it clearly at Dvin in Armenia, the night after a lunar eclipse that occurred on 27 December 893. However, the location has been given as Ardabil in several sources. The event was recorded by contemporary Armenian and Arabic chroniclers, including Ibn al-Jawzi. The Arabic name for the city is Dabil, and this may have led the 14th-century writer Ibn Kathir to place the earthquake in Ardabil in Azerbaijan. Ibn Kathir was then quoted by al-Suyuti in the 15th century. Further writers also placed the earthquake in Ardabil, and added some details, such as waters drying up, while changing others, such as making the eclipse preceding the earthquake solar instead of lunar.

Almost all of the Dvin earthquake's details are repeated in these reports, although in most cases the observed lunar eclipse has become a solar eclipse. One source refers to this earthquake as taking place in 'Outer India' at an unnamed capital. This report has been repeated in several other sources, with the location given as 'Daibul', near modern Karachi. It is now considered that no such earthquake occurred in India/Pakistan and that the 'well known' alleged 893 Ardabil earthquake is a phantom, despite it appearing in many modern catalogues and reference books.

In the National Geophysical Data Center earthquake database entry for this event, the date of the earthquake is variously given as 23 March, 27 March, 14 December, 24 December, with the year as 893, 894 or 895 in the quoted sources.

== See also ==
- List of earthquakes in Armenia
- List of historical earthquakes
