= Masrur al-Balkhi =

9th-century Abbasid general

Masrur al-Balkhi (Arabic: مسرور البلخي; died 26 December 893) was a senior military officer in the late-9th century Abbasid Caliphate.

== Career ==
Little is known of Masrur's background; his nisba suggests that he was from Balkh and of Iranian origin. He is first mentioned by the historian al-Tabari in 870, during the events that resulted in the deposition of the caliph al-Muhtadi. When the revolt of Musa ibn Bugha al-Kabir began, Masrur was one of several officers who remained loyal to the Abbasid caliph, and he was placed in charge of the administration of the caliph's palace. During the battle against the rebels he was in command of al-Muhtadi's right flank, but the caliph's forces were defeated and the troops fled.

During the reign of al-Mu'tamid (r. 870–892), the caliph's brother and effective regent al-Muwaffaq made Masrur one of the leading officers of the Abbasid army. In 872 he led an expedition against the Jacobite Assyrians in Upper Mesopotamia and succeeded in routing them, and in 872, 874 and 875 he commanded several campaigns against the Kharijite rebel Musawir in al-Jazira. In 875 he replaced Musa ibn Bugha as the commander in charge of suppressing the Zanj Rebellion, and was named as the governor of al-Ahwaz, Basra, the Tigris districts, al-Yamama, and al-Bahrayn. Later that year, as part of al-Mu'tamid's succession arrangements, he was nominally appointed as al-Muwaffaq's governor of all of the eastern provinces of the caliphate.

In 876, Masrur participated in the campaign to halt the Saffarid amir Ya'qub ibn al-Layth's advance into Mesopotamia. In an attempt to slow down Ya'qub's progress, he flooded the region around Wasit by breaching a dike on the Tigris; he then made his way toward the main government army at Sib Bani Kuma. When the two sides met at the decisive Battle of Dayr al-Aqul, Masrur commanded al-Muwaffaq's left flank. After the Abbasid forces were victorious, Masrur's role in the battle was acknowledged in a public statement, and he was awarded the estates of Abu al-Saj Dewdad, who had fought on the Saffarid side.

Following the battle, Masrur resumed overseeing the operations against the Zanj; he also advanced to the region of al-Ahwaz and periodically fought the rebels there. In 881, after al-Muwaffaq decided to personally campaign against the Zanj, Masrur joined his camp, and served as one of his commanders for the duration of the rebellion. He participated in the attack against the Zanj capital of al-Mukhtara, though no mention is made of him during the final assault in 884.

== Family ==
Masrur had at least two sons. Muhammad ibn Masrur was appointed as governor of the Mecca Road by al-Muwaffaq in 879; he deputed his brother 'Ali to assume the post, but the latter was killed by tribesmen of the Banu Asad while en route to al-Mughithah.
