= Diyar Rabi'a =

Map of the Jazira (Upper Mesopotamia), with its provinces, in medieval times

Diyar Rabi'a (Arabic: دِيَارُ رَبِيعَةَ, romanized: Diyār Rabīʿa, lit. 'abode of Rabi'a') is the medieval Arabic name of the easternmost and largest of the three provinces of the Jazira (Upper Mesopotamia), the other two being Diyar Bakr and Diyar Mudar. According to the medieval geographer al-Baladhuri, all three provinces were named after the main Arab tribes that were settled there by Mu'awiya in the course of the Muslim conquests of the 7th century. The Diyar Rabi'a was settled by the Rabi'a tribe.

== Structure ==
Diyar Rabi'a encompasses the upper reaches of the river Khabur and its tributaries, i.e. the regions of Tur Abdin and Beth Arabaye, as well as both shores of the river Tigris from the vicinity of Jazirat ibn Umar in the north to the boundary with Iraq in the area of Tikrit in the south, including the lower reaches of the Upper Zab and Lower Zab. The main city of the province was Mosul (Arabic al-Mawsil), with other important urban centres at Balad, Jazirat ibn Umar, al-Sinn, Barqa'id, Sinjar, Nisibis, Mardin and Ra's al-'Ayn. According to Michael Morony, Nisibis had been the administrative center of the region from the Sassanian times to the Abbasid period, though this is supported only from the evidence from the Abbasid period. It seems likely, that during the Umayyad period the Diyar Rabi'a was not yet a administrative subdivision of the Jazira province and was only created in Abbasid times.

== History ==
In the 690s, the region became part of the Jazira province whose oversight was given to Muhammad ibn Marwan, who ruled from Harran. The region was plagued by the raids of the Qarmatians in the Abbasid period. In the mid-10th century, it came under the control of the native Hamdanid dynasty, centred at Mosul. The Hamdanid emirate was terminated by the Buyids in 980, and the province passed under the control of the Uqaylids, who held it until the Seljuq conquest in the late 11th century.

== Sources ==
- Brunner, Kyle B. (2021). "Simeon of the Olives and his World: Life of the Khabur Basin during the early Islamic period". The Life of Simeon of the Olives: An Entrepreneurial Saint of Early Islamic North Mesopotamia. Gorgias Press LLC. ISBN 978-1-4632-4346-3.
- Canard, Marius & Cahen, Claude (1965). "Diyār Bakr". In Lewis, B.; Pellat, Ch. & Schacht, J. (eds.). The Encyclopaedia of Islam, Second Edition. Volume II: C–G. Leiden: E. J. Brill. pp. 343–345. OCLC 495469475.
- Canard, Marius & Cahen, Claude (1965). "Diyār Rabī'a". In Lewis, B.; Pellat, Ch. & Schacht, J. (eds.). The Encyclopaedia of Islam, Second Edition. Volume II: C–G. Leiden: E. J. Brill. pp. 348–349. OCLC 495469475.
