= Taym Allah =

Arabian tribe belonging to the Banu Bakr confederation

Taym Allah (also transliterated Taymallah), known as Taym Allat (also transliterated Taymallat) in the pre-Islamic period or before their conversion to Christianity, were an Arab tribe in eastern Arabia and the lower Euphrates valley, belonging to the Banu Bakr confederation. They were a relatively minor branch and most of their pre-Islamic history pertains to their role in the Lahazim alliance of Bakrite tribes in the alliance's conflicts with the Tamim tribe and the Lakhmids, the main Arab vassals of the Sasanian Empire. They fought against the Muslims during the conquest of Iraq, but afterward embraced Islam and eventually, a number of their tribesmen held important military positions in the eastern provinces of the Caliphate. A small section of the tribe settled the Wadi al-Taym valley, which is called after them, in modern Lebanon.

== Origins, abode and pre-Islamic history ==
The Taym Allah were originally called 'Taym Allat' after their eponymous progenitor, a son of Tha'laba ibn Ukaba ibn Sa'b ibn Ali ibn Bakr ibn Wa'il. The name may have been altered to 'Taym Allah' after their embrace of Christianity or Islam as 'Allat' referred to an Arabian polytheistic god. They were a branch of the Banu Bakr ibn Wa'il tribe, part of the larger group of north Arabian tribes descended from Rabi'a ibn Nizar. Although not specified in the early Arabic sources, the Taym Allah's abode was probably in eastern Arabia. They embraced Monophysite Christianity, like many Bakrites, before the advent of Islam in the 620s–630s.

A relatively minor nomadic tribe on its own, the Taym Allah allied with other Bakrite tribes, namely its brother tribe, the Banu Qays ibn Tha'laba, and the Banu Ijl, and the non-Bakrite Anaza tribe, to form the Lahazim group. The alliance's purpose was to strengthen these tribes' position against the powerful Bakrite nomads of the Banu Shayban, or more likely, to better defend themselves against the large nomadic tribe of Tamim, specifically its Banu Yarbu division. The Shayban and the Bakrite Banu Dhuhl never fought against the Lahazim, and at times, fought alongside the Lahazim in the battles with the Tamim, The Taym Allah are rarely mentioned specifically in the Arabic ayyam literature, which referred to the battle-days of the pre-Islamic Arab tribes. However, as a component of the Lahazim, they probably participated in its battles against the Tamim. In any case, they did not fight with any distinction or provide important battle leaders to the alliance in those engagements, most of whom were supplied by the Ijl. The Taym Allah are reported to have fought alongside their Bakrite tribesmen against the al-Hira-based Lakhmids, Arab client kings of the Sasanian Empire, including at the famed Battle of Dhi Qar in 611 CE.

== Islamic history ==
The Taym Allah, and the largely Christian, core tribes of the Lahazim in general, appear to have fought against the Muslim conquests of eastern Arabia in the Ridda wars (632–633) and the lower Euphrates in modern Iraq afterward. The Taym Allah tribesmen are mentioned as being among the fighters of Abjar ibn Bujayr of the Ijl, who backed the rebellion of the pro-Sasanian al-Hutam from the Qays ibn Tha'laba in eastern Arabia during the Ridda. They are then found in the ranks of the Christian Ijl chief Abu al-Aswad when he and a local Sasanian garrison fought the Muslims at the Battle of Walaja in Iraq. No members of the tribe are recorded as participants on the Muslim side during the Iraqi conquests.

The tribe, nonetheless, embraced Islam. A member, Iyas ibn Abd Allah, played a role among the Muslim rebels who killed Caliph Uthman in Medina in 656. In the Kufa-based army of Uthman's caliphal successor, Ali, a member of the tribe, Ziyad ibn Khasafa, was a commander who fought against the governor of Syria, Mu'awiya ibn Abi Sufyan at the Battle of Siffin in 657, during the First Muslim Civil War. Another member of the tribe, Bahr ibn Ka'b ibn Ubayd Allah, is held by the 10th-century historian al-Tabari to have struck and killed a young nephew of Husayn ibn Ali, grandson of the Islamic prophet Muhammad, at the Battle of Karbala in 680.

Members of the tribe played an increasingly prominent role in the easternmost provinces of the early Caliphate, especially in Khurasan and Sijistan. There, a governor and poet from the Taym Allah, Aws ibn Tha'laba ibn Zufar ibn Wadi'a, defended the city of Herat with distinction against the forces of Mus'ab ibn al-Zubayr led by Abd Allah ibn Khazim al-Sulami in 684–685. At the time, the Caliphate was in middle of the Second Muslim Civil War, with Mus'ab representing the Mecca-based Zubayrid side against the Syria-based Umayyads. With all of the Bakrite tribesmen of Khurasan, Aws ibn Tha'laba held out in Herat for a year before being slain. The Umayyads reasserted control over the Caliphate by 692. In the eastern provinces, the Taym Allah tribesmen Tayhan ibn Abjar is mentioned as the first person to have renounced the authority of Caliph Abd al-Malik and joined the anti-Umayyad rebellion of Abd al-Rahman ibn Muhammad ibn al-Ash'ath in 700-701, according to a report by Abu Mikhnaf, cited by al-Tabari. Another poet and chief of the Taym Allah, Nahar ibn Tawsi'a, was a commander in the conquests led by the Umayyad commander Qutayba ibn Muslim in Transoxiana (the part of Central Asia beyond the Oxus) in the early 8th century, despite having earlier mocked Qutayba in verse. Nahar was known as the Bakr's best poet in Khurasan.

The founder of the Hanafi madhhab (Islamic school of jurisprudence), Abu Hanifa (d. 767), was sometimes given the tribe's epithet, 'al-Taymi', because his grandfather had been a freed mawla (client) of the Taym Allah.

A small part of the Taym Allah eventually settled in the valley at the western foot of Mount Hermon. The valley became known as Wadi al-Taym (Wadi Taym-Allah) after them. This valley became one of the first places where the heterodox Druze faith, which branched out of Isma'ili Shia Islam, took root in the 11th century.

== Bibliography ==
- Donner, Fred McGraw (1980). "The Bakr B. Wā'il Tribes and Politics in Northeastern Arabia on the Eve of Islam". Studia Islamica (51): 5–38. doi:10.2307/1595370. JSTOR 1595370.
- Levi Della Vida, G. (2000). "Taym Allah". In Bearman, P. J.; Bianquis, Th.; Bosworth, C. E.; van Donzel, E. & Heinrichs, W. P. (eds.). The Encyclopaedia of Islam, Second Edition. Volume X: T–U. Leiden: E. J. Brill. pp. 400–401. ISBN 978-90-04-11211-7.
- Schacht, J. (1960). "Abu Hanifa". In Gibb, H. A. R.; Kramers, J. H.; Lévi-Provençal, E.; Schacht, J.; Lewis, B. & Pellat, Ch. (eds.). The Encyclopaedia of Islam, Second Edition. Volume I: A–B. Leiden: E. J. Brill. pp. 123–124. OCLC 495469456.
- Hawting, G. R., ed. (1996). The History of al-Ṭabarī, Volume XVII: The First Civil War: From the Battle of Siffīn to the Death of ʿAlī, A.D. 656–661/A.H. 36–40. SUNY Series in Near Eastern Studies. Albany, New York: State University of New York Press. ISBN 978-0-7914-2393-6.
- Howard, I. K. A., ed. (1990). The History of al-Ṭabarī, Volume XIX: The Caliphate of Yazīd ibn Muʿāwiyah, A.D. 680–683/A.H. 60–64. SUNY Series in Near Eastern Studies. Albany, New York: State University of New York Press. ISBN 978-0-7914-0040-1.
- Hinds, Martin, ed. (1990). The History of al-Ṭabarī, Volume XXIII: The Zenith of the Marwānid House: The Last Years of ʿAbd al-Malik and the Caliphate of al-Walīd, A.D. 700–715/A.H. 81–95. SUNY Series in Near Eastern Studies. Albany, New York: State University of New York Press. ISBN 978-0-88706-721-1.
