= Iyad (tribe) =

Arab tribe

The Iyad (Arabic: إياد, romanized: Iyād) were an Arab tribe which dwelt in western lower and upper Mesopotamia and northern Syria during the 3rd–7th centuries CE. Parts of the tribe adopted Christianity in the mid-3rd century and came under the suzerainty of the Lakhmid kings of al-Hirah, vassals of the Sasanian Empire. From that time, parts of the tribe settled in towns and villages along the Euphrates, while other parts remained nomadic and dwelt in the neighboring desert steppes. The Iyad played a significant role among the Arab tribes in the Fertile Crescent before the advent of Islam, as allies and opponents of the Sasanians and later allies of the Byzantine Empire. As the early Muslim conquests were underway, parts of the tribe in lower Mesopotamia embraced Islam, while those established in northern Syria and Upper Mesopotamia fled with the retreating Byzantine armies into Anatolia. They were expelled by Emperor Heraclius (r. 610–641) to Muslim territory after pressure by Caliph Umar (r. 634–644). Little is heard of the tribe afterward, though a number of Iyad tribesmen served as qadis (head judges) in different provinces of the Abbasid Caliphate in the 9th century and a family of the Iyad, that of Ibn Zuhr (d. 1162), grew prominent in Muslim Spain.

== History ==
=== Origins ===
The Iyad was a branch of the northern Arabian tribal grouping of Ma'add. According to the traditional Arab genealogists, the Iyad's eponymous progenitor was a son of Nizar ibn Ma'add ibn Adnan and a brother of the latter's sons Mudar, Rabi'a and Anmar, all of whom were also progenitors of large Arab tribes. The original dwelling places of the Iyad were in the Tihama coastal area of western Arabia down to the environs of Najran. The tribe, in alliance with the Mudar, forced out the Jurhum from Mecca and consequently became the masters of Mecca's Ka'aba, a major idol sanctuary for the polytheistic Arabs in the pre-Islamic period (pre-630s). Disputes ensued between the Iyad and the Mudar over control of the Ka'aba, and the Iyad was ousted from Mecca during hostilities with the Khuza'a tribe. The poetic verse that associated the Iyad with the Ka'aba emanated from a member of a tribe called Bashir, and this has rendered the Iyad's involvement with the sanctuary as a suspected fabrication produced to glorify the tribe.

=== Sasanian and Byzantine era ===
The Iyad played a significant role among the Arabs in Mesopotamia and Syria in the pre-Islamic era. In the first half of the 3rd century CE, large groups of Iyad tribesmen migrated to Bahrayn (eastern Arabia) and formed with other Arab tribes the Tanukh confederation. From Bahrayn the tribe moved into the Sawad (fertile region of lower Mesopotamia) where they grazed their animals and utilized the Ayn Ubagh spring near Anbar as their water source. Ayn Ubagh was their main area of concentration, though they also dwelt in scattered places south of al-Hirah. About the middle of the 3rd century the Iyad battled Jadhima ibn Malik, the Arab ruler of al-Hirah who was expanding his rule to encompass all the Arab tribes of lower Mesopotamia. Jadhima forced the Iyad to surrender their tribesman Adi ibn Rabi'a, who then married Jadhima's sister Riqash. A number of Iyad tribesmen thereafter settled in al-Hirah and adopted an urban way of life and the Christian faith, though it is possible members of the tribe converted to Christianity in the preceding years. The 9th-century historian al-Baladhuri mentions that the Iyad possessed four monasteries in al-Hirah.

A lone tradition in the Islamic-era sources mentions that the Iyad were the target of a punitive expedition by the Sasanian king Shapur II, but this may be a confusion with Khosrow I's campaign against the Iyad in the 6th century (see below), according to J. Schleifer. The historian Irfan Shahid supports the view that the Iyad were assaulted by the Sasanians either by Shapur II in the 4th century or by Khosrow (possibly confused by the Arabic sources for the more well-known, 6th-century Khosrow I) in the early 5th century, possibly c. 420. Shahid assumes the Iyad's adoption of Christianity may have caused tensions with the Sasanians, particularly following the persecutions of Yazdegerd I (r. 399–420), and that Sasanian expeditions precipitated the emigration of part of the tribe to Byzantine Oriens (e.g. the Levant). A testament to an Iyadi presence in Oriens is that the poet of the Salihid chieftain, Dawud al-Laqit, who served as the Byzantines' phylarch of the Arab tribes in its territory, was Abd al-As, a member of the Iyad.

The Iyad which remained in lower Mesopotamia may have come under the suzerainty of the Lakhmid rulers of al-Hirah, vassals of the Sasanian Empire. Members of the Iyad were concurrently recruited by the Sasanians. The Iyad tribesman Laqit ibn Ya'mur served as a secretary in the Sasanians' government department for Arab affairs in Ctesiphon and the Iyad poet Abu Duwad supervised the horses of the Lakhmid king al-Mundhir III ibn al-Nu'man (r. 505–554). Other components of the Iyad remained nomadic and often harried the peasants of lower Mesopotamia. In the early 6th century, the tribe made incursions into Sasanian territory east of the Euphrates river, prompting a punitive expedition by Khosrow I. The Iyad nomads took captive an elite Persian woman, and bested the Persian cavalry subsequently dispatched against them in a battle at Dayr al-Jamajim. The tribe ignored warnings by Laqit of the repercussions of challenging the Sasanians and were soon after ambushed and driven from their abodes by a Sasanian force. During the Sasanians' pursuit of the Iyad, they routed the tribe at the village of al-Hurajiya. The surviving tribesmen reestablished themselves in three main areas: the desert west of Mesopotamia; northern Syria up to the town of Ancyra (ancient Ankara) where some members of the tribe had already settled; and the different parts of Mesopotamia, including the Jazira (upper Mesopotamia), the area around al-Hirah and Tikrit. The Sasanians ousted them from Takrit, but they returned at some point before the Muslim conquest of the city in 637, where members of the tribe secretly aided the city's Sasanian garrison. Indeed, those who remained in the parts of Mesopotamia controlled by the Sasanians were obligated to serve as auxiliaries of its army. In the first decade of the 7th century, Iyad contingents were dispatched alongside the Quda'a Arab contingents led by Khalid ibn Yazid of the Bahra' tribe to confront the Banu Bakr nomads at the Battle of Dhi Qar. A part of the Iyad secretly cooperated the Banu Bakr and fled the field mid-battle, causing disorder in the Sasanian lines and contributing to the nomadic Arabs' first major battle victory against a Sasanian army.

=== Muslim conquests and Islamic era ===
The Iyad of Mesopotamia continued under Sasanian suzerainty along with most of the other Arab tribes of the region during the Muslim conquests in the 630s. In the Battle of Ayn al-Tamr in 633 or 634, the tribe fought under the Sasanian commander Mihran Bahram-i Chobin against the Muslim Arabs led by Khalid ibn al-Walid and again in nearby Sandawda. Members of the Iyad in Tikrit defected to the Muslims and embraced Islam during the assault on Tikrit in 637. Iyad tribesmen under Byzantine authority were sent by Emperor Heraclius with the Byzantine army to besiege the Muslims in Homs in 638, but ultimately withdrew with the Byzantine force into Cilicia where they were pursued and nearly eliminated by the Muslims. The Muslim general Iyad ibn Ghanm subjected much of northern Syria and upper Mesopotamia in the following year and the Arab tribes who dwelt in these territories embraced Islam with the exception of the Iyad.

The Iyad relocated to Byzantine-held Cappadocia in Anatolia, "with bag and baggage" according to al-Tabari. Caliph Umar (r. 634–644) sought their return to the Muslims' newly conquered territories and threatened to attack the Christians in his domains should Heraclius not extradite the Iyad. Four thousand Iyad tribesmen consequently reentered Syria and Mesopotamia and submitted to Muslim rule. Little is heard of the tribe in the historical record, thereafter.

Most of the few Iyad tribesmen who survived in the post-Islamic historical record settled in Kufa, near al-Hira. A member of the tribe, Adi ibn Wattad, who most likely came from Kufa, was appointed lieutenant governor of Rayy by al-Hajjaj ibn Yusuf in 696. Among the Iyad who are mentioned in Islamic history are the Abbasid caliph al-Ma'mun's qadi (head judge) Ahmad ibn Abi Du'ad (d. 854), the qadi of Egypt Ibn Abi'l-Layth (d. 864) and the qadi of Sistan Zafir ibn Sulayman. Members of the Iyad were also present in al-Andalus (Muslim Spain), including the well-known family of Ibn Zuhr (d. 1162).

== See also ==
- Taghlib

== Bibliography ==
- Crone, Patricia (1980). Slaves on Horses: The Evolution of the Islamic Polity (1980 ed.). Cambridge: Cambridge University Press. ISBN 978-0521229616.
- Fück, J. W. (1978). "Iyād". In van Donzel, E.; Lewis, B.; Pellat, Ch. & Bosworth, C. E. (eds.). The Encyclopaedia of Islam, Second Edition. Volume IV: Iran–Kha. Leiden: E. J. Brill. p. 289. ISBN 978-90-04-05745-6. OCLC 758278456.
- Kaegi, Walter E. (1992). Byzantium and the Early Islamic Conquests. Cambridge: Cambridge University Press. ISBN 0-521-41172-6.
- Schleifer, J. W. (1993) [1927]. "Iyād". In Houtsma, M. Th.; Wensinck, A. J.; Arnold, T. W.; Heffening, W.; Levi-Provençal, E. (eds.). First Encyclopaedia of Islam, 1913-1936. Vol. IV ʿItk–Kwaṭṭa (Reprint ed.). Leiden, New York and Koln: Brill. pp. 565–566. ISBN 90-04-09790-2.
- Shahid, Irfan (1989). Byzantium and the Arabs in the Fifth Century. Washington, D.C.: Dumbarton Oaks Research Library and Collection. ISBN 0-88402-152-1.
