= Shurahbil =

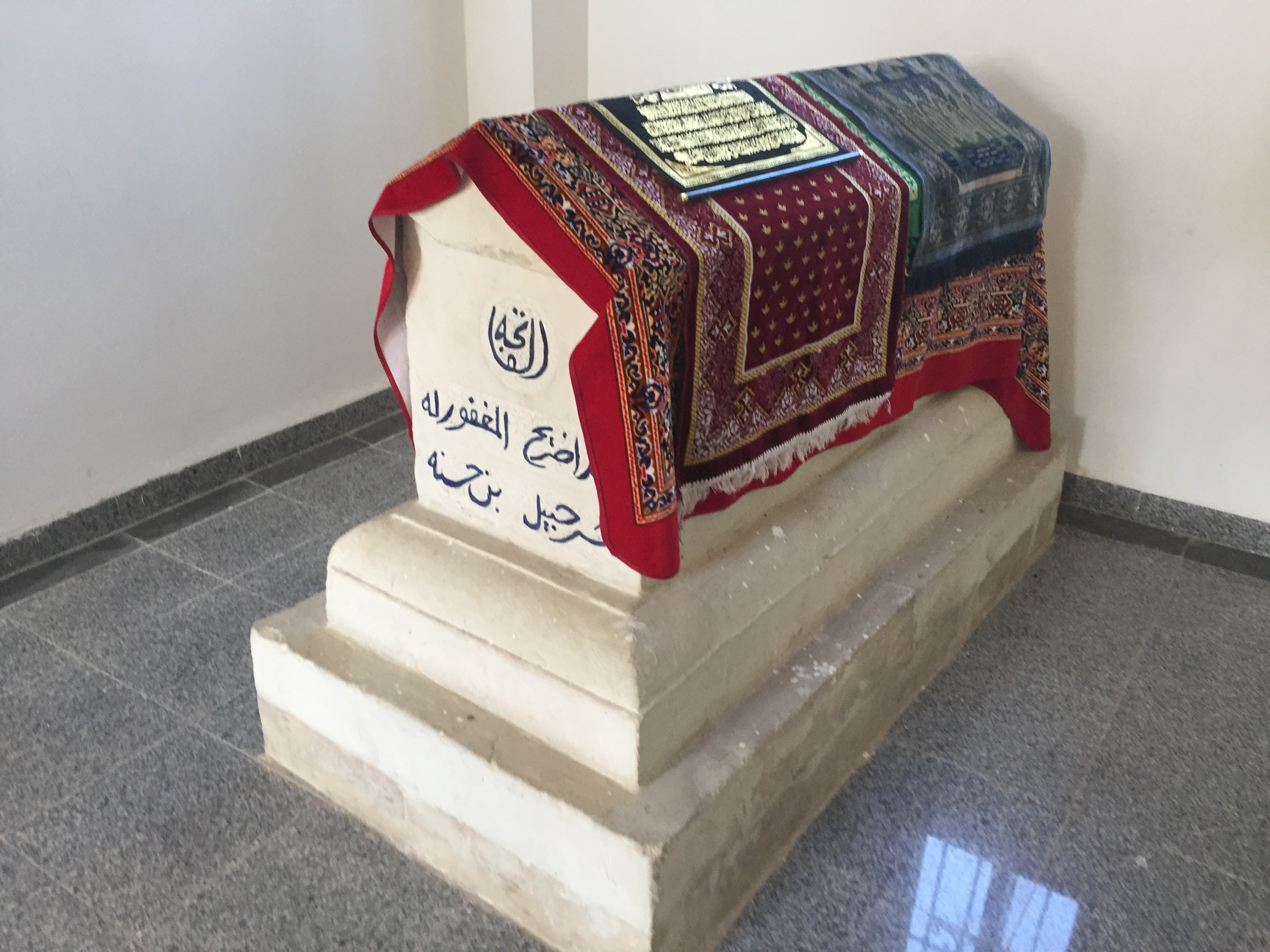
- The tomb of Shurahbil ibn Hasana located in a mosque at Jordan
- Gender: Male
- Language: Arabic

Origin
- Meaning: The meaning is generally unknown

Other names
- Alternative spelling: Sharhabil; Sharhabeel; Charhabil; Cherhabil; Shurihbi'il

Shurahbil (Arabic: شرحبيل, romanized: Shuraḥbīl) is an Arab male given name of Syriac and Aramaic origin. Alternative spellings of this name include Sharhabil, Sharhabeel, Charhabil, Cherhabil and Shurihbi'il.

== Lexicology and meaning ==
The meaning of the name Shurahbil is generally unknown. According to the Muslim lexicographer Ibn Duraid, the name Shurahbil is not of native Arab origin, rather it is derived from Syriac. Ibn al-Kalbi states that every name with "il" at the back means something that is from El, which is Aramaic for God (Allah). Muslim scholar Ibn Abbas compares the name with other names of Aramaic origin like Ismail (derived from Ishmael) and Israfil (derived from Raphael). The name is also said to be of Indian origin with links to the word Shura which is another name for the Hindu god, Shiva. A Mandaean female version of the name, Sharhabeil, exists as well.

== Transliterations and popularity ==
The name Shurahbil is also transliterated as Sharhabil or Sharhabeel. It also has the alternative spellings Charhabil and Cherhabil. An ancient version of this name, Shurihbi'il, appears in inscriptions from the Himyarite Kingdom of Yemen. The name is most common in Nigeria, Morocco and Malaysia.

== People with the given name ==
=== Shurahbil ===
- Shurahbil ibn al-Harith, one of the two leaders of the major factions of the First Battle of Kulab, a major conflict in pre-Islamic Arabia
- Shurahbil ibn Hasana (died 639 CE) one of the earliest converts to Islam and a companion of Muhammad, as well as a key military commander for the Rashidun Caliphate
- Shurahbil ibn Simt, 7th-century South Arabian Muslim warrior and military commander from the tribe of Kinda

=== Sharhabil ===
- Sharhabeil, a saint of the faith of Mandaeism
- Sharhabil Ya'fur (died c. 465 CE) a Himyarite king who ruled in the 5th century CE
- Sharhabil Yakkuf (died c. 480 CE) a Himyarite king who founded a new ruling dynasty in the 5th century CE and persecuted Christians in his realm
- Sharhabil Ahmed, musician from Omdurman, Sudan

== People with the surname ==
=== Sharhabil ===
- Yusuf ibn Sharhabil (died c. 530 CE) a Jewish ruler of the Himyarite kingdom who was well known for his persecutions of Christians throughout his realm and an infamous role in both Islamic and Christian traditions
- Ayyub ibn Sharhabil, 8th-century Umayyad governor of Egypt

=== Cherhabil ===
- Hocine Cherhabil, former Minister of Digitization and Statistics in Algeria
