= Banu Kanz =

Arabic Muslim dynasty (943–1365)

Banu Kanz بنو كنز
- Parent family: Banu Hanifa
- Country: Upper Egypt and Nubia
- Origin: Najd, Arabia
- Founded: 943
- Founder: Ishaq ibn Bishr
- Historic seat: Aswan
- Titles: Kanz al-Dawla
- Dissolution: 1365

Banu Kanz (Arabic: بنو كنز), also known as Awlad Kanz, was a semi-nomadic Muslim dynasty of Egyptian Arab descent that ruled the border region between Upper Egypt and Nubia between the 10th and 15th centuries. They were descended from the sons of sheikhs of the Arab Banu Hanifa tribe who intermarried with the princesses of the Beja Hadariba tribe. They gained official control over the region of Aswan, Wadi Allaqi and the frontier zone in the early 11th century when their chief, Abu al-Makarim Hibatallah, captured a major rebel on behalf of the Fatimid authorities. Abu al-Makarim was accorded the title Kanz al-Dawla (Treasure of the State) by Caliph al-Hakim and his successors inherited the title. The Banu Kanz entered into conflict with the Ayyubids in 1174, during which they were defeated and forced to migrate southward into northern Nubia, where they helped accelerate the expansion of Islam in the mostly Christian region. They eventually assumed control of the Nubian Kingdom of Makuria in the early 14th century, but by the early the 15th century, they were supplanted by the Hawwara tribesmen dispatched by the Mamluks to combat the Banu Kanz.

== History ==
=== Origins ===
The origins of the Banu al-Kanz lay in the Arab tribal migrations to the Egyptian frontier region with Nubia in the 9th century. The nomadic Arab tribes, of which the largest were the Mudhar, Rabi'ah, Juhaynah and Qays 'Aylan, moved to the region after the discovery of gold and emerald mines there. The Banu Kanz originated from the Banu Hanifa, who moved to Egypt from Arabia during the reign of Abbasid caliph al-Mutawakkil, between 847 and 861 CE. In 855, Abdullah ibn Abd al-Hamid al-Umari, a Medina native who studied in al-Fustat and Kairouan, emigrated to Aswan, where he sought to profit from the region's gold mines. He and his slaves were sheltered by the Mudhar and gradually, he became the latter's eminent sheikh (chieftain). Al-Umari and the Mudhar were driven out of Wadi Allaqi and Aswan by the Rabi'ah and proceeded to set up their encampments and mining colony at al-Shanka, to the east of the Kingdom of Makuria ("al-Maqurra" in Arabic). Al-Umari was driven back north to Wadi Allaqi and Aswan by the Nubians of Muqurra in the late 9th century. Thereafter, he gained recognition from the Juhayna, Rabi'ah and Qays 'Aylan as their collective leader. Al-Umari oversaw a huge gold mining enterprise in the region, and the industry financed his own virtual independence in Wadi Allaqi and Aswan. Although he twice defeated the Egyptian army of Ahmad ibn Tulun, the governor of Egypt (r. 868–884), and forced the latter to cease attempts to subjugate him, al-Umari assassinated by Mudhar tribesmen after suppressing a revolt by Rabi'ah. Following his fall, Arab tribal activity continued to increase in the Eastern Desert region.

The Rabi'ah emerged as the strongest of the Arab tribes inhabiting the Egyptian-Nubian frontier region. By the 10th century, they were running a principality that replaced that of al-Umari's. The Rabi'ah was able to grow powerful because of their alliance with the indigenous Beja people, namely the Muslim Hadariba tribe, which controlled the region between the Red Sea coastline and the eastern banks of the Nile River. The alliance manifested in business partnerships in the mining industry and intermarriage, including between the chiefs of the two tribes. The sons of Rabi'ah father and Hadariba mothers inherited the lands and titles of their maternal grandparents since Beja inheritance prioritized descent from the mother. Thus, by 943, Ishaq ibn Bishr, who was born to a Rabi'ah father, became the chief of the Rabi'ah-Hadariba principality after succeeding his maternal Beja uncles Abdak and Kawk. According to the 14th-century Arab historian Ibn Fadlallah al-Umari, the Rab'iah and Beja "became like one" during Ishaq's reign. The latter was killed during an intra-tribal war in Wadi Allaqi, and was succeeded by a paternal cousin from Bilbays, Abu Yazid ibn Ishaq. Abu Yazid established Aswan as the principality's capital and was recognized by the Fatimid Caliphate, which controlled Upper Egypt, as the "protector of Aswan".

=== Kanz al-Dawla and integration into the Fatimid state ===
In 1006, Abu Yazid's son and successor, Abu al-Makarim Hibatallah, was given the title of Kanz al-Dawla (Treasure of the State) by Fatimid caliph Al-Hakim bi Amr Allah as an honorary reward for capturing the anti-Fatimid rebel Abu Rakwa. Thenceforth, Abu al-Makarim's successors inherited the Kanz al-Dawla title, while the mixed Rabi'ah-Hadariba people of their principality became known as the "Banu Kanz" (also spelled Banu'l Kanz, Banu al-Kanz or Kunuz). The principality of the Banu Kanz included the countryside of Aswan to the north, the frontier with Nubia to the south and most of the Eastern Desert between Aswan and the Red Sea. This put the Banu Kanz in control of Wadi Allaqi's mines, the routes connecting the mines to Aswan and the Red Sea port town of Aydhab and the trade between Nubia and Egypt. Altogether, this enabled the Banu Kanz to derive substantial wealth and influence.

Despite their power, the Banu Kanz were not independent from the Fatimid state and the Kanz al-Dawla, who reported to the Fatimid governor of Qus, benefited from the integral role he played within the Fatimid system. The caliphs accorded the Kanz al-Dawla responsibility for regulating Fatimid diplomatic ties and commerce with Nubia, tax collection in the frontier villages, protecting the mines of Wadi Allaqi and travelers and caravans passing through the principality. The Maris-based Nubian counterparts of the Kanz al-Dawla played a similar role and also belonged to a minor branch of the Rabi'ah-Hadariba confederation.

=== Conflict with the Ayyubids ===
In 1168, the Banu Kanz provided safe haven to the disbanded black African regiments of the Fatimid army by the influential aides of Caliph al-Adid, Shirkuh and his nephew Saladin. Saladin toppled al-Adid in 1171 and established the Ayyubid Sultanate in Egypt. In 1171/72, the Nubian army, together with the Fatimids' former black African contingents, attempted to occupy Upper Egypt and sacked Aswan, prompting the Kanz al-Dawla to request military assistance from Saladin, to which he complied. The Ayyubids and the Banu Kanz drove out the Nubians and the Fatimid rebel army units from Upper Egypt. Although the Ayyubids helped the Banu Kanz in repelling the Nubian invasion, their rule also saw the rise of a Syrian Turco-Kurdish military elite in Egypt at the expense of the Arab tribes and African regiments, both of which the Fatimids had maintained close ties with and at one point governed Egypt. Accordingly, the Banu Kanz and the Arab tribes of Upper Egypt felt that their iqta (fiefs) and official privileges were threatened by the new Ayyubid order. When Saladin transferred the iqta of the Banu Kanz to an Ayyubid emir (a brother of senior Ayyubid emir Abu al-Hayja al-Samin), the Banu Kanz killed the emir and his retinue. In 1174, Ibn al-Mutawwaj, the Kanz al-Dawla, launched an insurrection against the Ayyubids to restore the Fatimids. He gained the support of other Arab tribes in the region and the African regiments and sought to join the revolt of Abbas ibn Shadi, the leader of the Arab tribes in Middle Egypt. Before the Banu Kanz could link with Abbas, Saladin's forces under Abu al-Hayja's command defeated and killed Abbas. The Ayyubid army proceeded to confront the Banu Kanz, who were defeated after major clashes in Aswan. Ibn al-Mutawwaj was eventually captured and executed in the aftermath of his army's defeat.

The expulsion of the Banu Kanz from the frontier zone around Aswan caused the area's neglect, including the greatly reduced exploitation of the mines and the increased vulnerability of travelers and caravans to Bedouin raids, due to the absence of the Banu Kanz, the region's traditional guardians. With the loss of their capital, the Banu Kanz migrated south to occupy Maris, where Nubian control of the region had been significantly diminished due to the Ayyubid punitive expedition in 1172. While the Banu Kanz assimilated into the Nubian culture and language, their way of life remained Islamic. The presence of the Banu Kanz in Maris significantly contributed to the spread of Islam and the Arabic language in Nubia.

=== Domination of Makuria and relations with the Mamluks ===
In 1317, the Mamluk sultan an-Nasir Muhammad (the Mamluks succeeded the Ayyubids in Egypt in 1250) maneuvered to install a puppet Muslim pretender, Barshanbu, as king of Christian Makuria, to replace King Karanbas. The latter sought to avoid his deposition by sending an-Nasir Muhammad the Kanz al-Dawla, who was a nephew of Karanbas, as a potential Muslim replacement instead of Barshanbu. Karanbas viewed the Kanz al-Dawla as more tolerable and potentially cooperative than Barshanbu. However, the Kanz al-Dawla was arrested by the Mamluks upon his arrival to Cairo and the Mamluks successfully installed Barshanbu as king. The latter subsequently made Islam the religion of Makuria. The Kanz al-Dawla was released shortly thereafter and usurped the throne, prompting an-Nasir Muhammad to launch two unsuccessful expeditions against the Banu Kanz (the last occurring in 1324), and the Kanz al-Dawla held onto the Makurian throne.

During the reign of Sultan al-Ashraf Sha'ban and regent Yalbugha al-Umari, the Banu Kanz and their Arab ally, the Banu Ikrima, were in control of the region between the Red Sea ports of Aydhab and Suakin in the east and the Nile River banks to the west. The Mamluks sent an expedition against the Banu Kanz and Banu Ikrima after Dongola was captured by the tribesmen and its king killed. The Kanz al-Dawla and other Banu Kanz chiefs surrendered to the Mamluk governor of Qus in December 1365. In 1366, the Banu Kanz attacked Aswan and in 1370 they attacked and burned the city again. They were defeated in a military expedition by Ibn Hassan, the governor of Aswan, in 1378. During the reign of Sultan Barquq, the latter dispatched the Berber tribesmen of the Hawwara confederation to Upper Egypt and the frontier region to counter the Banu Kanz. The Hawwara gradually replaced the Banu Kanz as the dominant force in the region. The modern tribal descendants of the Banu Kanz are known as the "Kunuz" and they inhabit the Upper Egypt reaches of.

== See also ==
- List of rulers of Makuria

== Bibliography ==
- Baadj, Amar S. (2015). Saladin, the Almohads and the Banū Ghāniya: The Contest for North Africa (12th and 13th centuries). Brill. ISBN 9789004298576.
- Hasan, Yusuf Fadl (1967). The Arabs and the Sudan From the Seventh to the Early Sixteenth Century. Edinburgh University Press. OCLC 33206034.
- Holt, Peter Malcolm (1986). The Age of the Crusades: The Near East from the Eleventh Century to 151. Addison Wesley Longman Limited. ISBN 9781317871521.
- Lev, Yaacov (1999). Saladin in Egypt. Leiden, Boston, Köln: Brill. ISBN 90-04-11221-9.
