= Al-Mutalammis =

Arab Christian poet (died circa 580)

Jarīr ibn ʻAbd al-Masīḥ
- جرير بن عبد المسيح
- Died: c. 580 CE; Bosra
- Known for: Arabic poetry
- Title: al-Mutalammis
- Relatives: Tarafa (nephew)

Al-Mutalammis (Arabic: المتلمس), real name Jarīr ibn ʻAbd al-Masīḥ, was a 6th-century Arab Christian poet. He was the maternal uncle of fellow poet Tarafa. Al-Mutalammis was from the Banu Bakr tribe.

== Biography ==
His real name was Jarir ibn 'Abd al-Masih and he was from the tribe of Banu Bakr. His patronymic Ibn 'Abd al-Masih implies that he was an Arab Christian and not a follower of pre-Islamic polytheism. (Note: 'Abd al-Masih is a name for Arab Christians which means "Slave (or servant) of the Messiah" in Arabic.) His nephew was the poet Tarafa.

Ibn Sallam al-Jumahi places Al-Mutalammis in the seventh of the later classes of poets that lived before Islam.

== Conflict with the Lakhmids ==
Al-Mutalammis and his nephew Tarafa travelled to the city of Al-Hira around the 6th century, where they visited 'Amr ibn Hind, the Lakhmid ruler of the city. The three men had generally good relations until Tarafa recited a poem which was insulting towards 'Amr ibn Hind. After the two poets had left Al-Hira, 'Amr ibn Hind sent a message to both of them which ordered them to come forward to ancient Bahrain for their execution. Tarafa, not wanting to break the royal seal, went ahead to Al-Hira for his execution, while Al-Mutalammis instead ignored the letter and threw it away, hence saving his life. He escaped via camel to the Ghassanids.

== Legacy ==
Al-Mutalammis died around 580 CE in the Syrian city of Bosra. A fictionalized version of him appears in the book 1001 Arabian Nights, where he escapes from the king Al-Nu'man III ibn al-Mundhir. Some of his poetry has been compiled into a book known as the Dīwān Shiʿr al-Mutalammis al-Ḍubaʿī.

== See also ==
- List of Arabic-language poets
