= Ibn H'ddri =

Meq'ed Ibn H'ddri, also Meq'ed of Hothail Albogoom (Arabic: مقعد بن حدري) was the sheikh of Hothail Albogom from the Adnanite tribe of Hothail. In the mid-19th century, he lived at Abar Alzayddi (Al-zayddi wells, which belonged to H'addri's uncle Mazyad Pasha Ibn Dhumain) to the east of Alnir mountain in Najd. He was considered one of the most prominent knights of the Arabian Peninsula and a well-known owner of Arabian horse studs, including Ma'anagi H'ddri(or Hidrigi), Saklawi H'ddri and Kuhaila H'ddri.

== Horses ==
Meq'ed's contributions to Arabian horse breeds, especially the Ma’naqiyah al-Hadriyah, endure as part of his lasting legacy.

=== Ma'anagi H'ddri ===
Ibn H'addri captured a horse from Ibn Sbyel in a mid-19th century battle and changed its name from Ma’anagi Sbeyli to Ma’anagi H'ddri. Ma’anagi is from Um Argub or Urkub. Mohamed El Kalabi considered it as one of "Al Khamsa". It is originally from Al A'awajiyat stud, the stud of Rabi`ah Ibn Nizar Ibn Ma'ed. Al A'awajiyat is breed of Prophet Solomon's horse. A famous horse of Ma’anagi H'ddri stud is Darley. Napoleon's horse was Ma’anagi H'ddri.

=== Darley Arabian ===
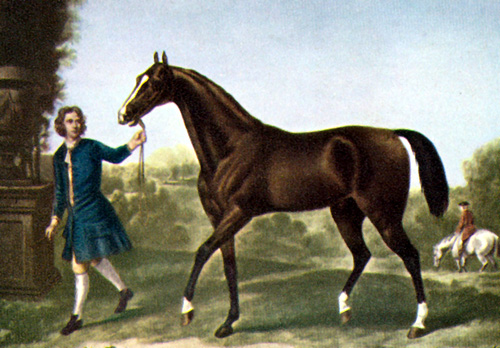
Darley Arabian

Darley Arabian was one of three foundation sires of modern thoroughbred horse racing bloodstock. In 95% of modern Thoroughbred racehorses, the Y chromosome can be traced back to this single stallion.

The Darley Arabian sired Flying Childers and was the great-great-grandsire of the stallion Eclipse. The Darley Arabian was the most important sire in the history of the English Thoroughbred.

=== Eclipse ===
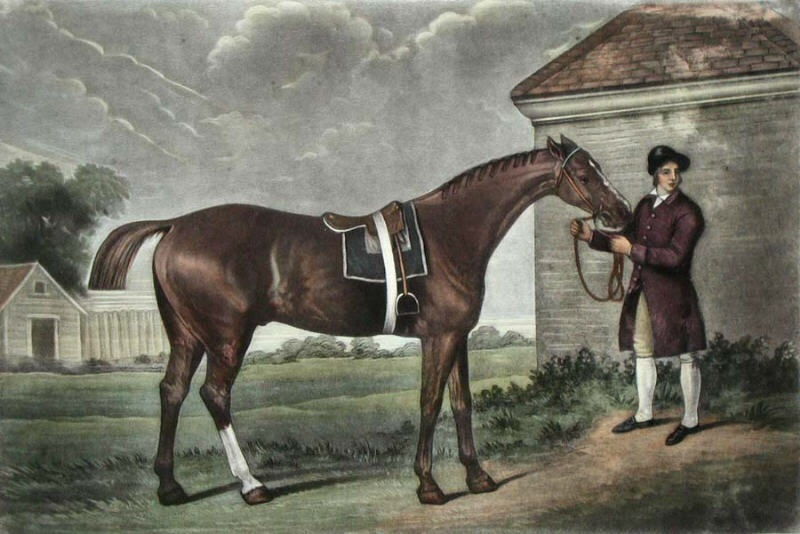
Eclipse

Eclipse (1 April 1764 – 26 February 1789) was an outstanding, undefeated 18th-century British thoroughbred. It won 18 races. It died due to colic on 26 February 1789, at age 24; his skeleton is now housed at the Royal Veterinary College.

=== Saklawi H'ddri ===
Saklawi H'ddri stud was attributed to Ibn Hidri originally for Juhail Ibn Jadraan (Saklawi Jadrani). Sheikh Faisal and Sheikh Abdullrahman Ibn Sha'lan had this stud until it was transferred to Italy. Many of the more highly valued class of horses today trace their lineage to this stud.

=== Kuhaila H'ddri ===
Kuhaila H'ddri stud was attributed to Ibn H'addri.
