= First Battle of Kulab =

The First Battle of Kulab (Arabic: يوم الكلاب الأول, Yawm al-Kulāb al-Awwal) was a major conflict in pre-Islamic Arabia involving the Kingdom of Kinda and various tribes of the Rabi'ah and Tamim tribal confederations. Fought near a spring named Kulab in the Najd region, the battle is a centerpiece of the Ayyam al-Arab (Days of the Arabs) literary tradition, marking the collapse of Kindite hegemony over Central Arabia. Along with Dhi Qar and Shi'b Jabala, it is one of the most famous pre-Islamic battle-days.

== Background ==
Following the death of the Kindite king al-Harith ibn Amr, a succession crisis broke out between his sons, Salama and Shurahbil. Each brother sought to secure the throne by rallying the support of the powerful nomadic tribes that had previously been under Kindite vassalage. The conflict essentially became a Kindite civil war fought by proxy through these tribal alliances.

== Tribal alliances ==
The battle reignited old rivalries, most notably between the Banu Bakr and Banu Taghlib tribes (cousin tribes of the Rabi'ah branch), whose decades-long Basus War had only recently concluded. The two main factions of the war were that of Salama and Shurahbil. Salama was supported by Taghlib, including its Namir branch and elements of the Banu Tamim. Shurahbil was supported by Banu Bakir, other elements of the Banu Tamim, and the Ribab confederation. As the battle intensified, the accounts suggest that many of the Tamim contingents deserted both sides, leaving the Bakr (fighting for Shurahbil) and the Taghlib (fighting for Salama) as the primary combatants on the field.

== Outcome ==
The faction led by Salama and the Taghlib achieved a decisive victory. Shurahbil's forces were routed, and the prince himself was killed during the retreat. According to chroniclers, Shurahbil himself was wounded by a Taghlibite named Habib ibn Utba (though, Habib was killed) and ultimately killed by Habib's brother, Abu Hanash. The head of Shurahbil was brought back and presented to Salama, who, seeing it, expressed remorse over the fratricidal conflict.
