= Azadbeh =

Azadveh-i Banegan Mahan-i Mihr-Bondad, known in Arabic sources as Azadhbih ibn Baniyan Mahan ibn Mihrbundadh, better simply known as Azadbeh, was an Iranian nobleman, who served as the Sasanian marzban of al-Hira in the period 617-633.

== Biography ==
Azadbeh was born in Hamadan in the province of Media to a family of dehqan origin. In 617 or 618, he was appointed as the governor of al-Hira, thus succeeding the Iranian noble Nakhiragan and the Arab Iyas ibn Qabisah al-Ta'i, who together had co-governed al-Hira after the execution of the last Lakhmid ruler al-Nu'man III in 602. During his governorship, Azadbeh managed to secure his position by giving his daughter in marriage to the lord of Sinnin, who was of higher rank than him. Al-Taberi cites an older source that Azadbeh ruled for 17 years, which suggests that he was appointed as governor in 617 rather than 618, but there are some uncertainty about the chronology.

In 633, during the Muslim conquest of Persia, Muslim forces destroyed Amghishiya, an important military post near al-Hira, which Azadbeh saw as very important. Furthermore, the Muslims also took his daughter captive. Knowing that he would soon be their next target, he sent an army under his son to attack the Muslims, and after some time stationed outside of al-Hira. However, things did not go as expected, and Azadbeh's son was defeated and killed during a clash with the Muslim military leader Khalid ibn al-Walid, who marched towards al-Hira and easily defeated Azadbeh, who managed to survive and fled from al-Hira.

Nothing is known about him afterwards.

== Sources ==
- Pourshariati, Parvaneh (2008). Decline and Fall of the Sasanian Empire: The Sasanian-Parthian Confederacy and the Arab Conquest of Iran. London and New York: I.B. Tauris. ISBN 978-1-84511-645-3.
- Zarrinkub, Abd al-Husain (1975). "The Arab conquest of Iran and its aftermath". The Cambridge History of Iran, Volume 4: From the Arab Invasion to the Saljuqs. Cambridge: Cambridge University Press. pp. 1–57. ISBN 978-0-521-20093-6.
- Morony, Michael G. (2005) [1984]. Iraq After The Muslim Conquest. Gorgias Press LLC. ISBN 978-1-59333-315-7.
- Bosworth, C. E. (1987). "ĀZĀḎBEH B. BĀNEGĀN". Encyclopaedia Iranica, Vol. III, Fasc. 2. p. 177.
