= Iyas ibn Qabisah al-Ta'i =

Governor of al-Hirah (r. 613–618)

Iyas ibn Qabisah al-Ta'i (Arabic: إياس بن قبيصة الطائي) was governor of al-Hirah, the capital of the Lakhmid kingdom, from 613 to 618CE. He was the son of Qabisah al-Ta'i. He was also the father of Hayyah and Farwah. The last part of Iyas ibn Qabisah's name, al-Ta'i, indicates that he came from the Tayy tribe.

Iyas ibn Qabisah or his father, was appointed interim governor of al-Hirah for a few months in 580 by Sasanian monarch, Hormizd IV (r. 579–590), while a suitable candidate was sought among the Naṣrid dynasty that used to rule the Lakhmid kingdom. Later that year al-Nu'man III became king of the Lakhmid kingdom and replaced Qabisah as ruler of al-Hirah.

At some point the Persian king awarded Iyas 30 villages along the Euphrates as a grant for life and made him administrator of the district of Ayn al-Tamr.

Iyas ibn Qabisah gave Sasanian king Khosrow II (r. 590–628) a horse and slaughtered a camel for him when he met Iyas having fled from Bahram. Khosrow II showed his gratitude by rewarding Iyas in the following way. Al-Nu'man III ruled until 602 where he was executed by Khosrow, who appointed Iyas ibn Qabisah again as co-governor of al-Hirah alongside the Persian noble Nakhiragan.

Khosrow sent a message to Iyas enquiring where al-Nu'man's deposited possessions were. Iyas replied that al-Nu'man had found a safe refuge for them among the Bakr b. Wa'il. Khosrow ordered Iyas to get possession of what al-Nu'man had left behind and to forward that to him. Iyas sent a message to his brother Hani' saying "Send to me the coats of mail and other items al-Nu'man entrusted to you" (the lowest estimate of these mailed coats was four hundred, and the highest was eight hundred). But Hani' refused to hand over what he had engaged to protect.

In response, Iyas commanded pro-Sassanid Arab and Persian troops against the Banu Bakr at the Battle of Dhi Qar, in which the Sassanids were defeated. A range of dates from between about 603 to 623 have been suggested for the Battle by different researchers.

Iyas ibn Qabisah and Nakhiragan were succeeded by Azadbeh in 618. Azadbeh was succeeded by Al-Mundhir VI ibn al-Nu'man, who in turn was succeeded by Iyas ibn Qabisah's sons Hayyah and Farwah who surrendered al-Hirah to Khalid ibn al-Walid in 633.
