= Banu Ijl =

Arab tribe

Banu Ijl بنو عجل
- Adnanites
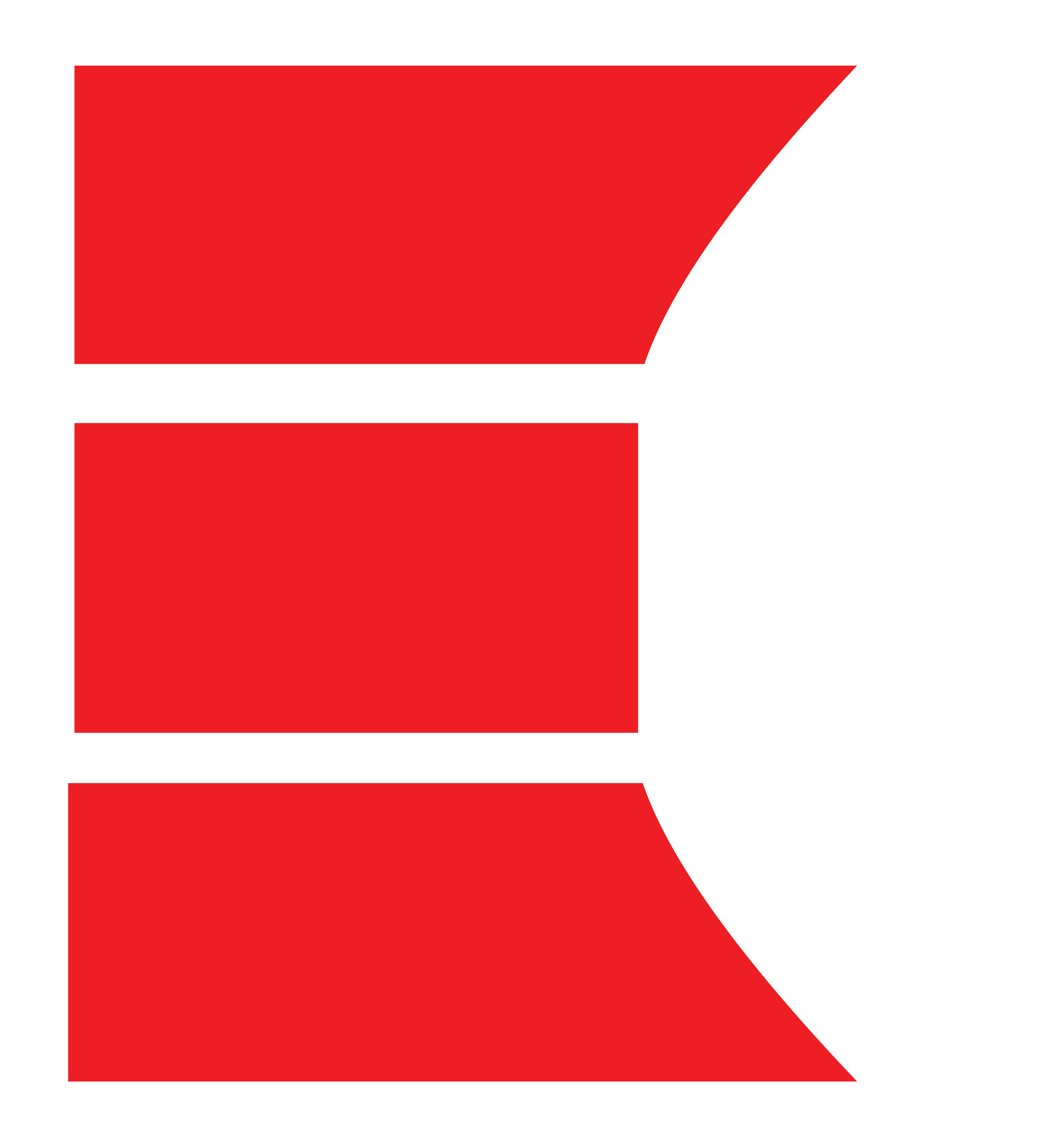
- Banner of Banu Ijl
- Ethnicity: Arab
- Nisba: Al-Ijli العجلي
- Location: Arabian Peninsula
- Descended from: Ijl ibn Lujaim
- Parent tribe: Banu Bakr
- Branches: Banu Dubay'a, Banu Sa'd, and Banu Rabi'a
- Religion: Christianity and Islam

Banu Ijl (Arabic: بنو عجل), also known as Banu Ajal, was an Arab tribe present in Lower Mesopotamia in the pre-Islamic and early Islamic period. It was a branch of the Banu Bakr tribe and part of the Lahazim tribal alliance.

== Ancestry ==
The ancestor of the Banu Ijl was Ijl ibn Lujaym ibn Sa'b ibn Ali ibn Bakr ibn Wa'il ibn Qasit ibn Hanab ibn Afsa ibn Da'mi ibn Jadila ibn Asad ibn Rabi'a ibn Nizar ibn Ma'ad ibn Adnan.

Ijl had three sons, Tha'laba, Abd al-Aswad and Yazid, and the tribe produced three sub-clans: Banu Dubay'a, Banu Sa'd and Banu Rabi'a.

== History ==
The Banu Ijl inhabited the region from Ayn al-Tamr to the southern shores around the town of Al-Ubulla. Some members of the Banu Ijl also lived in al-Yamama. The tribe was also a part of the large tribal alliance known as al-Lahazim. Other tribes who were part of the alliance are Banu Qays, Banu Taym and Banu Anazzah. This tribal alliance was made as a defensive coalition against other tribes, mainly the Banu Yarbu' and Banu Shayban. Banu Ijl also participated in the famous battle of Dhi Qar in which the Arab tribes defeated the Sasanian army. In the early Islamic conquests, the Banu Ijl Muslim tribesmen also joined the army of Khalid ibn al-Walid in the battles of Walaja and Ullais. in the Battle of Walaja it is reported that the Muslims of Banu 'Ijl fought against their own fellow Christians tribesmen of Banu Ijl who sided with the Sassanian army.

Christians were a significant part of the Banu Ijl tribe. In the eve of Islam, The leader of the tribe Abjar ibn Jabir was of Christian faith and he remained as such until his death in 660 in Kufa.

== Notable members ==
- Abu Dulaf al-Ijli, military general under the successive Abbāsid Caliph al-Mamun.
- Jahwar ibn Marar al-Ijli, military commander under the Abbāsid caliph al-Mansur, who was known for suppressing Sunpadh's Rebellion and later revolting against the Caliphate

== See also ==
- Tribes of Arabia
- Arab Christians
