= Al-Mundhir VI ibn al-Nu'man =

Last king of the Lakhmids

- King of the Lakhmid state
- Reign: 8 months, starting from 633 CE
- Predecessor: Azadbeh
- Successor: Position abolished
- Died: c. 633; Jawatha, now modern day Al-Ahsa Governorate, Saudi Arabia
- Cause of death: Killed in battle
- House: Lakhmids
- Father: Al-Nu'man III ibn al-Mundhir
- Religion: Nestorian Christianity (possibly)

Al-Mundhir VI ibn al-Nu'man (Arabic: المنذر بن النعمان) also known by the title al-Ma'rur was the final member of the Lakhmid dynasty to exert power and rule over the ancient city of Al-Hira. He was a son of Al-Nu'man III ibn al-Mundhir and succeeded the Persian governor Azadbeh, hence temporarily restoring the rule of Al-Hira to Lakhmid control. His reign was short, only ruling for eight months.

== Biography ==
=== Childhood ===
Al-Mundhir was a son of Al-Nu'man III ibn al-Mundhir. He also held the title al-Ma'rur. He is from the family of the Lakhmids, and not much is known from his early life.

=== Temporary rule and death ===
The Persian governor, Azadbeh, fled from his rule over Al-Hira in 633 CE after the city faced invasions from the Muslim armies of the Rashidun Caliphate. The rule returned to the family of Lakhm, with Al-Mundhir assuming power. However, his reign lasted for only eight months before the Muslim armies led by Khalid ibn al-Walid advanced on his territories. According to the historian Muhammad ibn Habib al-Baghdadi, Al-Mundhir was killed in a battle against the Muslims at a place known as Jawatha (present-day Al-Ahsa Governorate).

== Legacy ==
Al-Mundhir was the last Lakhmid ruler of Al-Hira. His death signified the end of the ruling dynasty. Muslims would rule Al-Hira and other areas of Mesopotamia after the Battle of Hira in 633 CE, the same year of his death.

== Religious affiliation ==
Al-Mundhir VI might have been a Nestorian Christian, as the Lakhmids themselves were Nestorians. However, Ibn Habib mentioned in the Kitāb al-Muḥabbar that Al-Mundhir was an "apostate" which implies he may have converted to Islam and then left the faith afterwards.

== See also ==
- Lakhmids
- Muslim conquest of Persia
