= Battle of Dhu Qar =

Pre-Islamic battle fought between Arabs in southern Iraq and a Sassanid Persian army

Coordinates: 30.108°N 44.945°E

Battle of Dhi Qar
Date	604–611
Location	Sasanian Empire (Dhi Qar, Southern Iraq)
Result	Arab victory

Belligerents
Sasanian Empire; Imperial Persian units; Banu Tayy; Banu Taghlib; Banu Iyad (Pro-Sasanian faction)	Arab tribal coalition; Banu Bakr; Banu Shayban; Banu Ijl; Banu Yashkur; Banu Dhuhl; Taym Allah; Banu Qays ibn Tha'labah; Banu Tamim

Commanders and leaders
Iyas ibn Qabisah al-Ta'i; Hāmarz al-Tustarī † al-Nuʿmān ibn Zurʿa †; Khālid ibn Yazīd †; Khunūbazīn †	Hani ibn Mas'ud; Hanzala ibn Tha'laba; Abd Amr ibn Bashar; Jabala ibn Ba'ith; Al-Harith ibn Wa'la; Al-Harith ibn Rabi'a

Strength
2,000 Persian soldiers, with 3,000 Arabs	

The Battle of Dhu Qar (Arabic: يوم ذي قار), also known as the War of the Camel's Udder, was a pre-Islamic battle fought between Arab tribes and the Persian Sasanian Empire in Southern Iraq between 604 and 611 AD. The battle is remembered as a turning point in Arab-Persian relations, and a blow to Persian control over Eastern Arabia, though the battle may have been no more than a skirmish. The battle is sometimes understood as part of a more prolonged Arab rebellion against the Persians, which culminated in the early Muslim conquests a few decades later.

== Background ==
In the sixth century, the Sasanian Empire ruled over the Lakhmid kingdom, a client Arab kingdom that played an essential role in projecting Sasanian power into Arab territories, and serving also as a buffer state that protected the Sasanians from nomadic Arab incursions. Seeking direct control over Arabia, the Persians deposed the Lakhmids in 602 AD. The Lakhmid king at the time, Al-Nu'man III, left his station in Al-Hira, the Lakhmid capital, to the royal court of Ctesiphon, the Sasanian capital. There, he was suddenly seized by the Sasanians and sent to a prison in Khanaqin, where he would eventually die of plague shortly before the rise of Islam. However, the decision to depose the Lakhmids would prove disastrous: in as few as two years later, it brought the Sasanians into immediate and direct conflict with the Banu Bakr, a major tribal confederation controlling large swathes of Arab territory.

== Series of events ==
After the Persians deposed the Lakhmids from their East Arabian and south Mesopotamia territories, they appointed as governor over the area the leader of the Arab Tayyi tribe, Iyas ibn Qabisa. This quickly brought the Persians and their new Arab auxiliaries into a conflict with the Banu Bakr, a large Arab tribal confederation which also projected their power through southwestern Iraq and the eastern Arabian peninsula. The Bakris won the battle, despite the absence of effective coordination among member tribes. Traditional Arabic sources claim that the Persians and Arab auxiliary forces numbered 2,000 and 3,000 each.

Persian sources do not mention the conflict. Two versions of the battle are known from later Arabic sources. One version goes back to Ibn al-Kalbi (d. 819), the other to Ma'mar ibn al-Muthanna (otherwise known as Abu Ubayda). The version of Ma'mar is considered more fantastical, and less reliable. According to Ma'mar's version of events, Khosrow II, the Sasanian emperor, deposed the Lakhmid ruler al-Nu'man III ibn al-Mundhir due to his anger at him for refusing to marry his daughter and insulting Persian women. Khosrow II also demanded that the leader of the Banu Shayban, the most powerful constituent tribe of the Banu Bakr confederation, hand over the family and armor of the former Lakhmid ruler. The demand was refused, leading to the Battle of Dhi Qar. According to Ibn al-Kalbi, the deposition of the Lakhmid ruler enabled Bakri raids into Persian territory. The Persian and Shaybani rulers came to an agreement to prevent further conflict. In spite of this agreement, rivalrous members within the Shaybani continued the raids, leading to the Persians imprisoning the Shaybani leader. The Persians demanded Bakri hostages in return for their leader. Upon their refusal, a conflict broke out, and the Battle of Dhi Qar was the result of these tensions.

== Date ==
Muslim traditions place the battle anywhere from 602 to 624 AD, but according to Encyclopædia Iranica, modern scholars have narrowed the range down to 604–611 AD.

== Primary sources ==
The battle of Dhi Qar is reported in many classical works of Arabic history and literature. The longest, but not necessarily most representative, version is Bishr ibn Marwan al-Asadi's Ḥarb Banī Shaybān maʻa Kisrá Ānūshirwān (Arabic: حرب بني شيبان مع كسرى آنوشروان). The classical account is found in Al-Tabari's History of the Prophets and Kings, and earlier, it is also found in the Khuzistan Chronicle.

== In popular culture ==
The battle is depicted in the 2025 film Desert Warrior.

== See also ==
- Aksumite–Persian wars
- Fijar Wars
- Al-Nu'man III

== Sources ==
- Bosworth, C. E. (1983). "Iran and the Arabs Before Islam". In Yarshater, Ehsan (ed.). The Cambridge History of Iran: The Seleucid, Parthian, and Sasanian periods (1). Cambridge: Cambridge University Press. pp. 593–612. ISBN 978-0-521-200929.
- Howard-Johnston, James (2021). The Last Great War of Antiquity. Oxford University Press.
- Landau-Tasseron, Ella (1995). "Ḏū Qār". In Yarshater, Ehsan (ed.). Encyclopædia Iranica. Vol. VII/6: Drugs–Ebn al-Aṯir. London and New York: Routledge & Kegan Paul. pp. 574–575. ISBN 978-1-56859-024-0.
- Morony, Michael G. (2005) [1984]. Iraq After The Muslim Conquest. Gorgias Press LLC. ISBN 978-1-59333-315-7.
- Rezakhani, Khodadad (2024). "The First Great War of the Middle Ages: the Sasanian Conquest of the Eastern Mediterranean (602–630 CE) as a Background to the Islamic Futūḥāt". In Hyland, John; Rezakhani, Khodadad (eds.). Brill's Companion to War in the Ancient Iranian Empires. Brill. pp. 600–653.
