= Nizar ibn Ma'add =

Common ancestor of northern Arab tribes (the Adnanites)

Nizar ibn Ma'add نزار بن معد
- Born: Arabia
- Died: Arabia
- Burial: Arabia
- Issue: Mudar; Rabi'a; Iyad; Anmar
- Father: Ma'add ibn Adnan
- Mother: Mu'ana bint Jahla Jurhum tribe

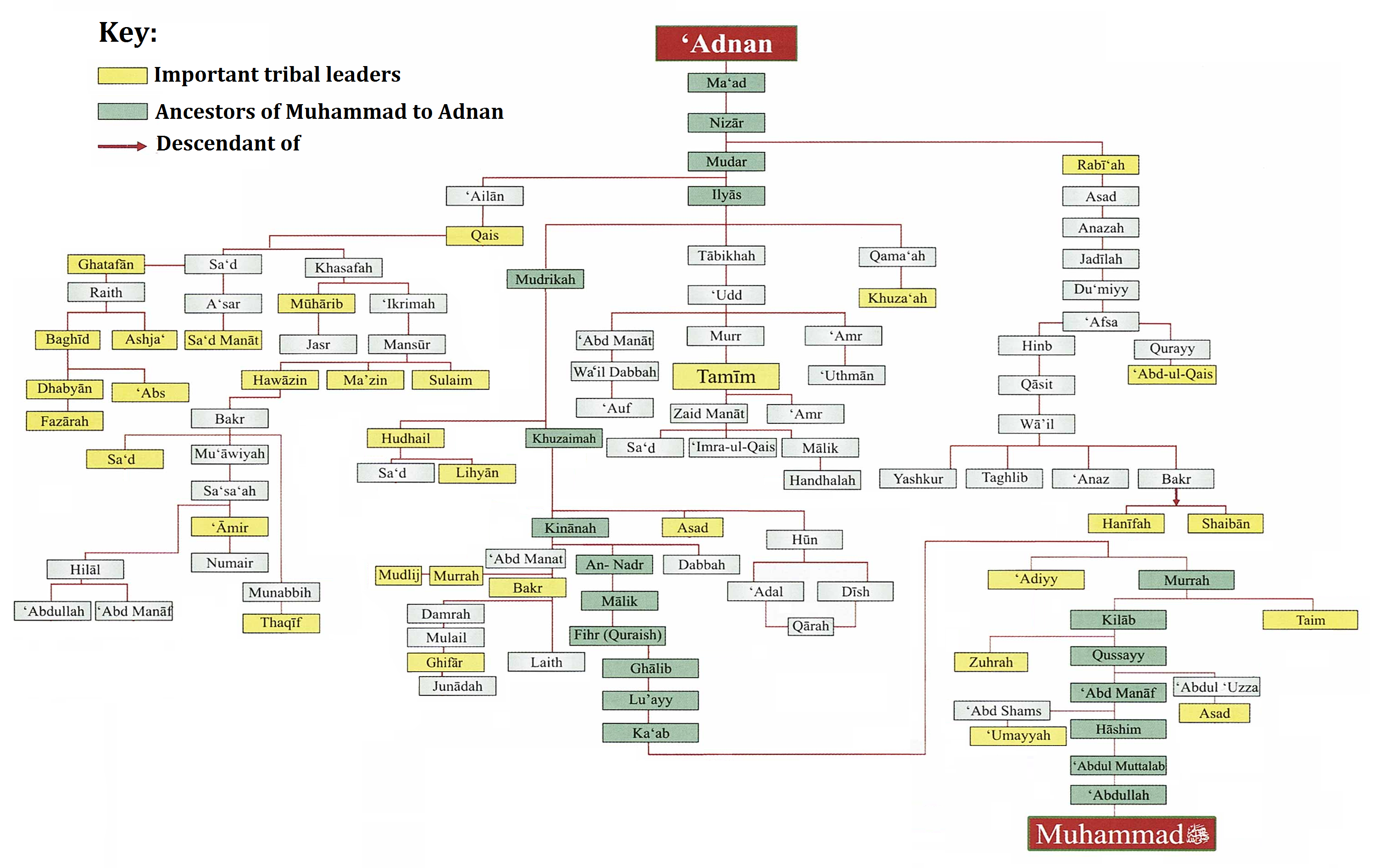
Family tree from Adnan to Muhammad

Nizar ibn Ma'add ibn Adnan (Arabic: نزار بن معد بن عدنان) was the common ancestor of most of the northern Arab tribes (the Adnanites), according to the Arab genealogical tradition. As a result, the term 'Nizar', or Nizariyya (نزارية), has been used as a loosely defined name for a group of tribes, most commonly the Rabi'a and Mudar tribes, but occasionally extended to include others.

== Ancestry ==
His father is Ma'add ibn Adnan, while his mother, Mu'ana bint Jahla, hailed from the South Arabian Jurhum tribe. More notable are his four sons, and progenitors of major tribal groupings: Rabi'a, Mudar, Anmar, and Iyad. According to the Arab genealogists, Mudar and Iyad were sired by Sawda bint Akk ibn Adnan, and Rabi'a and Anmar by Hadala bint Wa'lan of the Jurhum.

=== Family tree ===
Ma'ad ibn Adnan	Mu'ana bint Jahla
Quda'a	Nizar	Iyad
Mudar	Rabi'a	Iyad	Anmar

== Tribal label ==
The term Nizar is rarely attested in the pre-Islamic period. It is only after the Battle of Marj Rahit in 684, which cemented the rivalry between "southern" and "northern" Arab tribes, that the term Nizar (Banu Nizar or Nizariyya) begins to appear frequently, being used as an ethnic and political marker, contrasting with the southern "Yemeni" (Yamaniyya) or "Qahtanite" (Banu Qahtan) tribes. The term Ibna Nizar (lit. 'the two sons of Nizar') was applied to the two large "northern" tribal groups of Rabi'a and Mudar, who were previously considered as unrelated. The tribes claiming descent from Iyad or Anmar, who in some sources were regarded as sons of Ma'add, were only rarely considered part of the Nizari tribes. The term remained vague and malleable, however: attempts were made to reclassify the Banu Kalb, originally of "southern" origin, as descendants of Nizar, since they were among the most important supporters of the "Nizari" Umayyad dynasty.

As the linguist and historian Giorgio Levi Della Vida writes, "it is evident that we cannot speak of Nizar as a tribe which had a real historical existence nor, as is the case with the Ma'add, as a comprehensive term indicating an effective grouping together of a number of tribes of different origin. Nizar is simply a fictitious invention, a label intended to serve political interests".

== Sources ==
- Kindermann, H. (1995). "Rabīʾā and Muḍar". In Bosworth, C. E.; van Donzel, E.; Heinrichs, W. P. & Lecomte, G. (eds.). The Encyclopaedia of Islam, Second Edition. Volume VIII: Ned–Sam. Leiden: E. J. Brill. pp. 352–354. ISBN 978-90-04-09834-3.
- Levi Della Vida, Giorgio (1995). "Nizār b. Maʾādd". In Bosworth, C. E.; van Donzel, E.; Heinrichs, W. P. & Lecomte, G. (eds.). The Encyclopaedia of Islam, Second Edition. Volume VIII: Ned–Sam. Leiden: E. J. Brill. pp. 82–83. ISBN 978-90-04-09834-3.
