= Banu Hanifa =

Ancient Arab tribe

Banu Hanifa بنو حنيفة
- Rabi'aite Arab tribe
- Nisba: Al-Hanafi
- Location: Arabia
- Descended from: Hanifa bin Lujaim bin Saab bin Ali bin Bakr bin Wael
- Parent tribe: Banu Bakr
- Branches: Banu Al-Du'ul; Banu 'Adi; Banu 'Amer
- Religion: Christianity (pre-630); Islam (post 630)

Map of the Arabian Peninsula in 600 AD, showing the various Arab tribes and their areas of settlement. The Lakhmids (yellow) formed an Arab monarchy as clients of the Sasanian Empire, while the Ghassanids (red) formed an Arab monarchy as clients of the Roman Empire A map published by the British academic Harold Dixon during World War I, showing the presence of the Arab tribes in West Asia, 1914

Banu Hanifa (Arabic: بنو حنيفة) is an ancient Arab tribe inhabiting the area of al-Yamama in the central region of modern-day Saudi Arabia. The tribe belongs to the great Rabi'ah branch of North Arabian tribes, which also included Abdul Qays, Taghlib, al-Nammir ibn Qasit, and Anazzah. Though counted by the classical Arab genealogists as a Christian branch of Bani Bakr, they led an independent existence prior to Islam. The ruling House of Saud of Saudi Arabia are Hanifites.

== Pre-Islamic era ==
The tribe's members appear to have been mostly sedentary farmers at the dawn of Islam, living in small settlements along the wadis of eastern Nejd (known back then as al-Yamama), particularly the valley of Al-'Irdh, which later came to bear their name (see Wadi Hanifa). Sources such as Yaqut's 13th century encyclopedia credit them with the founding of the towns of Hadjr (the predecessor of today's Riyadh) and Manfuha, and being responsible for the granaries of Al-Kharj. According to legend, the tribe had moved to al-Yamamah from the Hejaz after the region's original inhabitants, the extinct people of Tasm and Jadis were decimated by war.

== During Muhammad's era ==
During Muhammad's era the Banu Hanifa tribe were involved in military conflict with him. Muhammad ordered the Expedition of Muhammad ibn Maslamah in July, 627 AD in Muharram, 6 AH.

A platoon of thirty Muslims under the leadership of Muhammad bin Maslamah was despatched on a military mission. It headed for the habitation of Banu Bakr sept. The Muslims attacked that sept and dispersed them in all directions. Plenty of spoils (war booty) were captured and the Muslims returned with the chief of the tribe of Banu Hanifa, called Thumamah bin Uthal Al-Hanafi.

Muhammad's companions tied him to a pole of a mosque. To a question posed by Muhammad, Thumamah used to say: "If you were to kill someone, then you would have to choose one of noble descent, if you were to be gracious, then let it be to a grateful man and if you were to ask for money, you would have to ask for it from a generous man." He repeated that three times on three occasions. The third time, Muhammad ordered that he should be released and later he converted to Islam.

== Islamic era ==
Banu Hanifa played an important role in early Islamic history. At around 632, according to the traditional Muslim chroniclers, they sent a delegation pledging allegiance to the Islamic prophet Muhammad. Among the members of the delegation was Musaylimah, who, probably from what he then saw, conceived the idea that he might set up a claim to prophethood. The delegation, before their departure, embraced Islam and denounced Christianity without compunction.

Muhammad died shortly afterwards, and the Banu Hanifa immediately renounced their new religion, under the leadership of their own self-proclaimed prophet, Musaylima. It is said, however, that Musaylima had declared his prophethood shortly before Muhammad's death, claiming to have been made a partner of Muhammad's in divine revelation. This, along with other apostasy movements in Arabia, triggered the Ridda Wars, in which the Muslims of Medina, under the leadership of the first caliph Abu Bakr, subjugated the rebellious tribes, but not before some heavy losses. The Muslims of Medina were only able to defeat Banu Hanifa on the third attempt, killing Musaylima in the battle of 'Aqraba, some 30 km north of modern Riyadh, and the rest of Banu Hanifa then made peace with the Muslims and rejoined the new Islamic state.

== Umayyad and Abbasid eras ==
Due to their role in the Apostasy movement, members of Banu Hanifa were initially banned from participating in the early Muslim conquests by the first Caliph, Abu Bakr. The ban was lifted by Abu Bakr's successor Umar, and members of Bani Hanifa subsequently joined Muslim forces in Iraq, with some settling in garrison towns such as al-Kufa.

Tribesmen from Banu Hanifa also supplied the ranks of rebellious movements such as the Kharijites. One member of the tribe by the name of Najdah ibn 'Amir, even founded a short-lived Kharijite state in the Arabian Peninsula during the Umayyad era. Thereafter the tribe seems to have resumed its pre-Islamic agricultural way of life, leading the famous Umayyad-era poet Jarir ibn Atiya to mock them in scathing satirical verse for choosing the "humble" life of the farmer over the "glorious" life of the Arab nomad, and accusing them of cowardice and incompetence in battle. Others such as the 8th century literary critic al-Jahiz, however, express admiration for their military prowess, surrounded as they were by hostile tribes from every direction. Al-Jahiz, however, also notes with curiosity that the tribe produced almost no poets of any repute after conversion to Islam. The tribes small pastoralist bedouin section, mentioned only fleetingly by Muslim sources, appears to have joined the rest of the bedouins of Bakr and 'Annizah in northern Arabia and southern Iraq, at some point after Islam according to al-Tabari.

Perhaps due to the legacy of the Ridda Wars and Najdah's Kharijites, the Umayyads and Abbasids made sure never to appoint a member of the tribe to governorship in their native province of Yamamah. In the mid 9th century, the Alid dynasty of Banul Ukhaidhir (c. 867) came to power in al-Yamama, having fled there from their native Mecca. According to Yaqut and others, Ukhaidhirite rule was harsh on Bani Hanifa, leading many of them to leave for Basra in Iraq, and to Upper Egypt, where sources such as al-Yaqubi of the 9th century state that Bani Hanifa formed the majority of the population of the valley of Wadi al-Allaqi, near Aswan, having moved there earlier with their women and children. There they worked in gold mining, and according to Yaqut, the "sultan of al-Allaqi" was a man of Bani Hanifa.

Geographers such as Al-Hamadani of the 10th century and Yaqut of the 13th seem to indicate that Bani Hanifa still resided in its ancestral lands at the time of their writings, though the tribe seems to have held little political power by then, and many of their old settlements had been taken over by other tribes, such as Bani Tamim and Bani 'Amir. Yaqut, however, reports that they still formed the majority in al-Yamama's provincial capital, Hadjr, though he could have been reporting from an earlier source.

== 13th century onwards ==
In the 14th century, however, Ibn Batuta relating his visit to Hadjr, also stated that most of its inhabitants are from Banu Hanifa, and even joined their emir, one Tufail ibn Ghanim, on a pilgrimage to Mecca. Little else is heard from Banu Hanifa thereafter, except that a number of clans in the region of Wadi Hanifa are given a Hanafite lineage by Jabr ibn Sayyar, the ruler of nearby Al-Qassab, in his short 17th-century manuscript on the genealogies of the people of Nejd.

According to King Salman Al Saud of Saudi Arabia, Banu Hanifa had assimilated into its larger cousin tribe Anizah, socially and politically. Tribes merging and assimilating through alliances and intermarriage was a common phenomenon.

== See also ==
- Al-Yamama
- Banu Bakr ibn Wa'il
- Banul Ukhaidhir
- Nejd
- Rabi'ah
- Hassan Abu Karib al-Himyari
- Anizah
- Rabi'a ibn Mani' al-Muraydi
