= Abu al-Atahiya =

Arab poet of the Abbasid period (c.748-c.828)

Abū Isḥāq Ismā’īl ibn al-Qāsim Abū al-‘Atāhiyya
- أبو إسحاق إسماعيل بن القاسم بن سويد العنزي
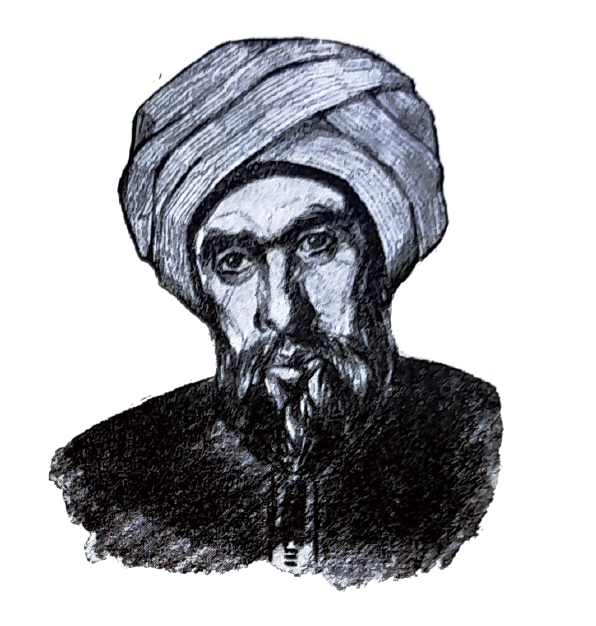
- A sketch representing Abu al-Atahiya from a book entitled Sayr mulhimah: min al-Sharq wa-al-Gharb by unknown author, 1961
- Born: c. 748; Ayn al-Tamr, Anbār, Irāq
- Died: c. 828; Baghdad, Iraq
- Other name: Abū Isḥāq Ismā’īl b. al-Qāsim b. Suwaid b. Kaisān al-Aini

Academic work
- Era: Abbāsid period (al-Mahdī era) and (Hārūn al-Rashīd era)
- Main interests: poetry
- Notable works: Diwan

Abū al-ʻAtāhiyya (Arabic: أبو العتاهية; 748–828), full name Abu Ishaq Isma'il ibn al-Qasim ibn Suwayd Al-Anzi (أبو إسحاق إسماعيل بن القاسم بن سويد العنزي), was one of the principal Arab poets of the early Islamic era, a prolific muwallad (Note: Note jahilī (جاهلي), pre-Islāmic era; mukhadram (مخضرم) pre-early-Islām; muwallad (مولد) Islāmic Era.) poet of ascetics who ranked with Bashshār and Abū Nuwās, both of whom he met. He renounced poetry for a time on religious grounds.

== Life ==
Abū l-ʻAtāhiyya was born in Ayn al-Tamr in Karbala. (Note: Ibn Khallikān says that some said ‘Abu al-Atāhiyah was born at Ain al-Tamr, in Hejāz near Medina, others said it was along the Euphrates near Anbār.) There are two views regarding his lineage: the first is that he was from the Anazzah tribe, while the other is that his family were mawali of the tribe of ʻAnaza. His youth was spent in Kufa, where he sold pottery. While he was selling pottery, he saw poets assemble for a competition and participated in it. Later, he composed eulogia to the governor of Tabaristan, emir Umar Ibn al-Alā (783-4/ 167AH).

With his reputation growing, Abū l-ʻAtāhiyya was drawn to Baghdad, the seat of the Abbāsid court where he soon became famous for his verses, especially for those addressed to ‘Utbah (Note: Khallikān describes ‘Utbah as the slave girl of the caliph al-Mahdī, while Iṣbahānī calls her slave girl of al-Khayzurān, mother of Hārūn al-Rashīd. Isḥāq al-Nadīm lists Abū al-‘Atāhiyah and ‘Utbah among the ‘passionate lovers’ whose stories became romanticised in book form.), a concubine of the Abbasid Caliph al-Mahdi. His love was unrequited, although Caliph al-Mahdi, and after him Caliph ar-Rashīd, interceded for him. At one point he offended the caliph, and was imprisoned for a short time.

Abū l-ʻAtāhiyya died in 828 during the reign of Caliph al-Ma'mūn. Al-Nadīm cites the qāḍī of al-Kūfah Ibn Kāmil (d.961) that he died on the same day as the grammarian ‘Amr ibn Abī ‘Amr al-Shaybānī and the court musician Ibrāhīm al-Mawṣilī in 828-9 / 213 AH. His tomb was on the banks of the Īsā canal (Note: The Īsā river, or canal, ran from the Euphrates into the Tigris. See Ibn Khallikān Wafayāt, (1843) I, p.209, n.14) opposite the Kantarat al-Zaiyātīn ('Oilmen Bridge')

== Legacy ==
The poetry of Abū l-ʻAtāhiyya is notable for its avoidance of the artificiality almost universal during his lifetime. The older poetry of the desert had been constantly imitated up until this time, although it was not natural to town life. Abū l-ʻAtāhiyya was one of the first to drop the old qasīda (elegy) form. He was very fluent and used many metres. He is also regarded as one of the earliest philosophical poets of the Arabs. Much of his poetry was concerned with the observation of common life and morality, and at times was pessimistic. Thus he was strongly suspected of heresy.

Ibn Abī Ṭāhir Ṭayfūr (819/20 —893/94) published an anthology of Abū al-‘Atāhiyah’s poetry. He was also included in Hārūn ibn ‘Alī al-Munajjim’s unfinished anthology “Traditions of the Poets,” along with contemporary poets Abū Nuwās and Bashshār. The vizier Ibn ‘Ammār al-Thaqafī (d. 931/ 319 AH) wrote Traditions about Abū al-‘Atāhiyah.

The Family of Abū al-‘Atāhiyah

Abū al-‘Atāhiyah produced poets among his children and grandchildren:

- Muḥammad ibn Abī al-‘Atāhiyah, surnamed Abū ‘Abd Allāh, was a hermit nicknamed al-‘Atāhiyah (the Foolish One);
- ‘Abd Allāh ibn Muḥammad ibn Abī al-‘Atāhiyah; and
- Abū Suwayd ‘Abd al-Qāwī ibn Muḥammad ibn Abī al-‘Atāhiyah.

Of the many anecdotes told of al-‘Atāhiyah, al-Nadīm relates one attributed to the Abbāsid court musician, Isḥāq al-Mawṣilī, that whenever he, al-Mawṣilī, saw three men, three others appeared: "Wherever al-Haytham ibn 'Adi was seen, Hishām al-Kalbī was there; if ‘Allawīyah was there then Mukhāriq turned up; Abū Nuwās was on hand if Abū al-‘Atāhiyah appeared." (Note: AI-Haytham and al-Kalbī were scholars of traditions; ‘Allawīyah and Mukhāriq were singers; Abū Nuwās and Abū al-‘Atāhiyah were poets; all lived about the time of Hārūn al-Rashīd or thereafter.).

== Bibliography ==
- Diwan (1887, Beirut: Jesuit Press; 2nd ed. 1888)
  - translated and published by Arthur Wormhoudt as Diwan Abu'l Atahiya (1981) ISBN 0-916358-05-4
- Ahlwardt, Wilhelm (1861). Diwan des Abu Nowas. Greifswald. pp. 21 ff.
- Baghdādī (al-), Abū al-‘Alā’ Sa‘d al-Ḥasan al-Rub’a (1994). al-Tāzī Sa’ūd, ‘Abd al-Wāhb (ed.). Kitāb al-Fuṣūṣ (in Arabic). Vol. 2. pp. 204–6 (§107).
- Guillaume, A. (1986) [1960]. "Abu 'l-ʿAtāhiya". In Bearman, P.; Bianquis, Th.; Bosworth, C.E.; van Donzel, E.; Heinrichs, W.P. (eds.). Encyclopaedia of Islam. Vol. I (2nd ed.). Leiden, Netherlands: Brill Publishers. ISBN 9789004161214.
- Ḥamawī (al-), Yāqūt (1993). Irshād al-Arīb ilā Ma'rifat al-Adīb (in Arabic). Vol. I. Beirut: Dar al-Gharb al-Islamiya. pp. 1708, 2649.
- Iṣbahānī, Abū al-Faraj (1888). Kitab al-Aghānī (in Arabic). Vol. III. Leiden: Brill. pp. 122–176.
- Kaḥḥālah, Umar Riḍā (1977). A'lām al-Nisā' (in Arabic). Vol. III. Bayrūt: Muʼassasat al-Risālah. p. 245.
- Khallikān, Aḥmad ibn Muḥammad (1843). Wafayāt al-A'yān wa-Anbā' Abnā' al-Zamān (The Obituaries of Eminent Men). Vol. I. Translated by McGuckin de Slane, William. Paris: Oriental Translation Fund of Great Britain and Ireland. pp. 202–210.
- Khaṭīb, Aḥmad b. ʿAlī b. Thābit b. Aḥmad (2001). Ma’rouf, Bashar A. (ed.). Ta'rikh Madīnatis-Salām (in Arabic). Vol. 7. Beirut: Dar al-Gharb al-Islami. pp. 226–238 (§3241).
- Alfred von Kremer, Culturgeschichte des Orients (1877, Vienna) vol. II, pp 372 ff
- Mubarrad (al-), Abū al-‘Abbās M. b. Yazīd (1997). Abū al-Faḍl Ibrāhīm, Muḥammad (ed.). Al-Kāmil fī al-Lughah (in Arabic). Vol. 3. Cairo: Dār al-Fikr al-‘Arbi. p. 4.
- Nadīm (al), Abū al-Faraj Muḥammad ibn Isḥāq Abū Ya'qūb al-Warrāq (1970). Dodge, Bayard (ed.). The Fihrist of al-Nadim; a tenth-century survey of Muslim culture. New York & London: Columbia University Press. pp. 151, 206, 315, 321, 325, 352, 355, 721, 965.
- Nadīm (al-), Abū al-Faraj Muḥammad ibn Isḥāq (1872). Flügel, Gustav (ed.). Kitāb al-Fihrist (in Arabic). Leipzig: F.C.W. Vogel. p. 160 (489).
- Stefan Sperl, Mannerism in Arabic Poetry: A Structural Analysis of Selected Texts (3rd Century AH/9th Century AD–5th Century AH/11th Century AD) (2005, Cambridge University Press) ISBN 0-521-52292-7
- Tzvetan Theophanov, "Abu-l-'Atahiya and the Philosophy". In: T. Theophanov. Philosophy and Arts in the Islamic World: Proceedings of the 18th Congress of the Union Europeenne des Arabisants et Islamisants (1998), p. 41-55. ISBN 978-90-6831-977-4
