= Al-Khirniq bint Badr =

Arabic poet (died c. 600)

- الخرنق بنت بدر بن هفان
- Died: c. 600 CE
- Occupation: Poet
- Spouse: Bishr ibn 'Amr
- Relatives: Tarafa ibn al'Abd (half-sister or aunt)
- Writing career
- Language: Arabic
- Notable work: Elegies

Al-Khirniq bint Badr ibn Hiffān (or Haffān; Arabic: الخرنق بنت بدر بن هفان; died c. 600) was an early Arabic elegiac poet. She was half-sister or aunt to the poet Tarafa ibn al'Abd.

Al-Khirniq's surviving diwan extends to somewhat under sixty lines, mostly preserved in the work of Abu 'Amr ibn al-'Ala'. Her known elegies are addressed to relatives, including her brother and her husband Bishr ibn 'Amr, who was slain by neighboring tribe on Mount Qudab.
