= Meriem Benmouloud =

Algerian politician (born 1980)

- مريم بن مولود
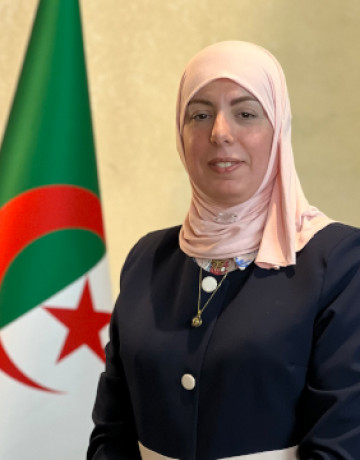
- Benmouloud in 2023

Minister of Digitization and Statistics
- Incumbent
- Assumed office 16 March 2023
- President: Abdelmadjid Tebboune
- Prime Minister: Aymen Benabderrahmane; Nadir Larbaoui
- Preceded by: Hocine Cherhabil

Personal details
- Born: 17 July 1980 (age 46)
- Education: University of Science and Technology Houari Boumediene

Meriem Benmouloud (Arabic: مريم بن مولود; born 17 July 1980) is the Algerian Minister of Digitization and Statistics. She was appointed as minister on 16 March 2023.
