= Hocine Cherhabil =

Algerian politician

- حسين شرحبيل
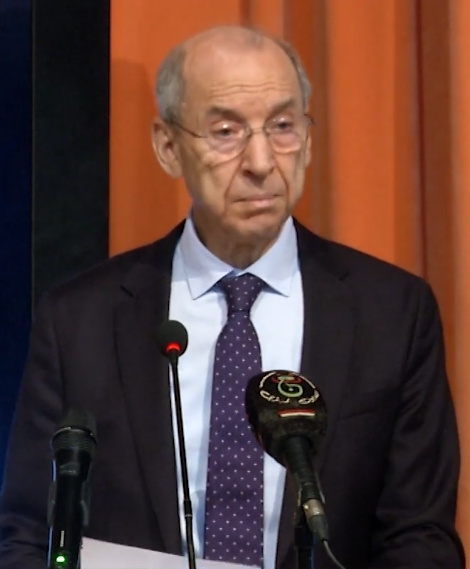
- Cherhabil in 2023

Minister of Digitization and Statistics
- In office 21 February 2021 – 16 March 2023
- President: Abdelmadjid Tebboune
- Prime Minister: Aymen Benabderrahmane
- Preceded by: Mounir Khaled Berrah
- Succeeded by: Meriem Benmiloud

Personal details
- Born: February 24, 1953 (age 73)
- Education: University of Algiers (D); University of Algiers (PhD)

Hocine Cherhabil (Arabic: حسين شرحبيل; born 24 February 1953) is an Algerian politician. Previously he had served as Minister of Digitization and Statistics from 2021 to 2023.

== Education ==
Cherhabil holds a Diploma in Political Science (1975) from the University of Algiers, a Diploma in Human Resources Management Techniques (1993) from the International Institute of Public Administration, a Doctorate in Social Sciences (1982) from the École des hautes études des sciences sociales de Paris and a Doctorate in Political Science and International Relations (2009) from the University of Algiers.
