= Amghishiya =

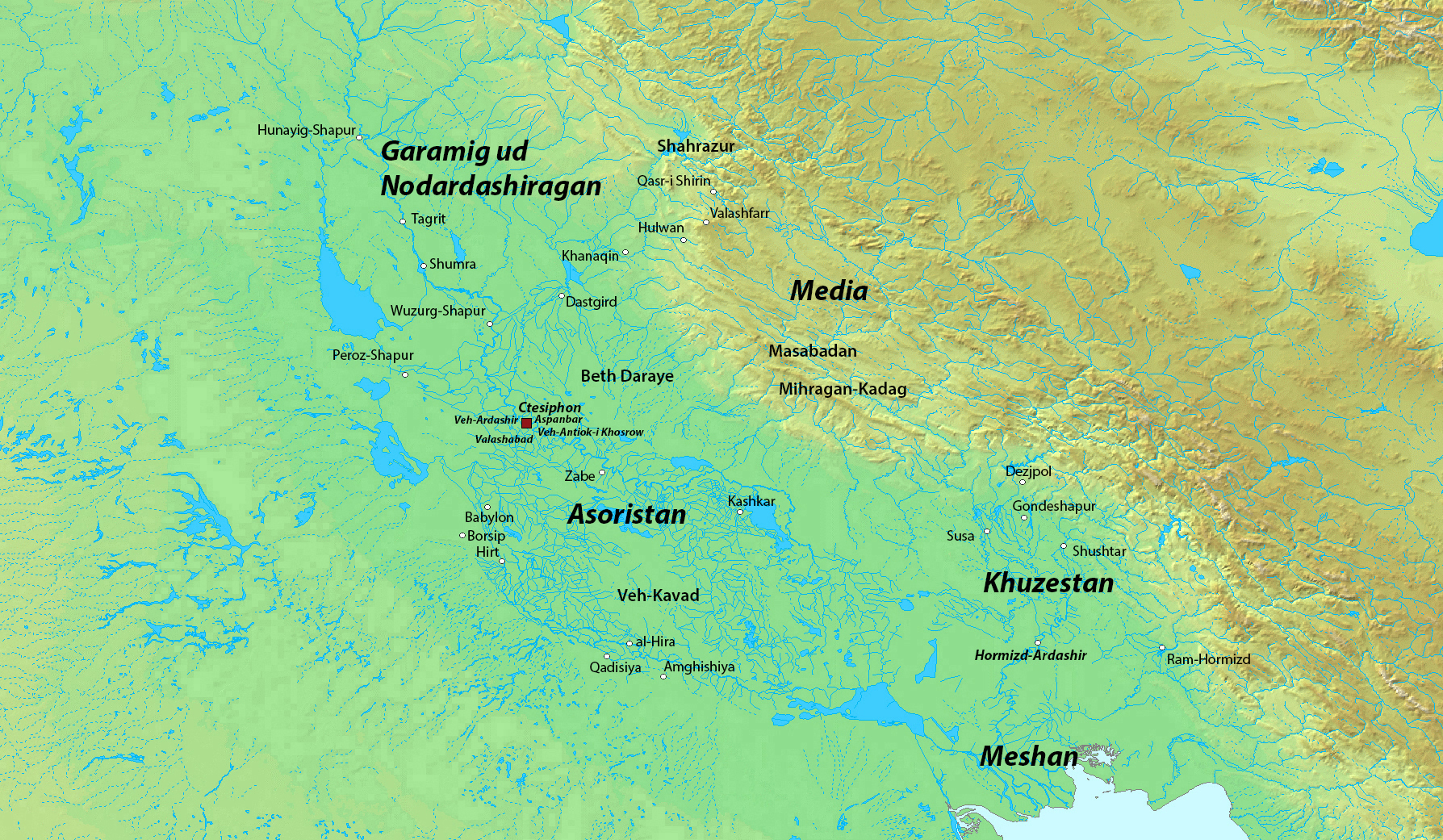
Map of the southwestern part of the Sasanian Empire.

Amghishiya was a Sasanian city or fortress located near the former Lakhmid capital of al-Hira. It was known as a major defensive headquarter. In 633, during the Muslim conquest of Persia, a battle took place in one of its satellite military posts, Ullais, where the Muslim Arabs defeated a combined army of Sasanian-Christian Arab troops. Amghishiya was thereafter invaded and sacked by the Muslim military officer Khalid ibn al-Walid, while the survivors of the place fled to the countryside.

== Sources ==
- Morony, Michael G. (2005) [1984]. Iraq After The Muslim Conquest. Gorgias Press LLC. ISBN 978-1-59333-315-7.
- Al-Tabari, Abu Ja'far Muhammad ibn Jarir (1993). Yar-Shater, Ehsan (ed.). The History of al-Tabari Vol. 11: The Challenge to the Empires A.D. 633-635/A.H. 12-13. Trans. Khalid Yahya Blankinship. Albany, NY: SUNY Press. ISBN 0791408523.
