= Alfred von Kremer =

Austrian diplomat, orientalist and politician (1828–1889)

Kremer, Alfred of
- Born: 13 May 1828; Penzing (Vienna district)
- Died: 27 December 1889 (aged 61); Döbling

Alfred von Kremer (13 May 1828 in Penzing, Vienna; 27 December 1889, Döbling) was an Austrian orientalist and politician.

== Life ==
Handwriting (1885)

Alfred Kremer first studied Philosophy in Vienna, then Jurisprudence. He self-taught Modern Greek, Arabic, Hebrew and Persian and travelled (1849–51) with a scholarship from the Academy of Sciences to Syria and Egypt.

On return he received the professorship of vernacular Arabic at the Vienna Polytechnic, a post he surrendered in May 1852 to return to Egypt as the first interpreter of the Austrian Consulate.

He received the vice-consulate (1858), consul in Cairo (1859), the consulate in Galaţi (1862), in Beirut (1870), and became ministerial advisor to the consular ministry in the Ministry of Foreign Affairs appointed to Vienna (1872), where he was elected a member of the Academy of Sciences (1876).

From May 1876 he lived in Cairo as a member of the Egyptian Government Debt Commission and returned to the Viennese Ministry of Foreign Affairs in the spring of 1880. A few months later he was appointed Austrian Minister of Commerce, an appointment he held until mid-February 1881.

== Works ==
Kremer's writings are mostly geographic and ethnographic in nature, especially the

- Beiträge zur Geographie des nördlichen Syriens (Contributions to the Geography of Northern Syria), Vienna 1852.
- Mittelsyrien und Damaskus (Central Syria and Damascus), Vienna 1853.
- Topographie von Damaskus (Topography of Damascus), Vienna 1855.
- Ägypten. Forschungen über Land und Volk (Egypt. Research on land and people), Leipzig 1863.
- Über die südarabische Sage (About the South Arabian legend), Leipzig 1866.
- Geschichte der herrschenden Ideen des Islams. (History of the prevailing ideas of Islam) Leipzig 1868
- Kulturgeschichtliche Streifzüge auf dem Gebiet des Islams. (Cultural-historical forays into the field of Islam.) Leipzig 1873

In wider circles he became known especially with the publication of Culturgeschichte des Orients unter den Chalifen ('History of the orient under the caliphs')(Vienna 1875-77, 2 volumes).

Among the Arabic texts he published were:

- Beschreibung Afrikas aus dem 12. Jahrhundert (Description of Africa from the 12th century) (Vienna 1852);
- Beschreibung Afrikas aus dem 12. Jahrhundert (al-Waqidi's 'History of the campaigns of Muhammad) (Calcutta 1855);
- Himjarische Kasideh (Himyaran Qasida) (Leipzig 1865) as well as a German adaptation of the
- Diwans des AbuNuwas (Diwan of Abu Nuwas) (Vienna 1855);
- Beiträge zur arabischen Lexikographie (Contributions to Arabic Lexicography) (Vienna 1883-84, 2 issues);
- Über meine Sammlung orientalischer Handschriften (On my collection of oriental manuscripts) (Vienna 1885).

He opposed the Slavic and clerical tendencies in Austria's internal politics in the treatise Die Nationalitätsidee und der Staat (The Nationality Idea and the State) (Vienna 1885).

== Literature ==
- Constantin von Wurzbach: Kremer, Alfred Ritter von. In: Biographisches Lexikon des Kaiserthums Oesterreich. 13. Vol. Kaiserlich-königliche Hof- und Staatsdruckerei, Vienna 1865, p. 196 (Digitalisat). (in German)
- Franz Ilwof: Kremer, Alfred Freiherr von. In: Allgemeine Deutsche Biographie (ADB). Vol. 51, Duncker & Humblot, Leipzig 1906, p. 374–376.
- Kremer Alfred Frh. von. In: Österreichisches Biographisches Lexikon 1815–1950 (ÖBL). Vol.4, Verlag der Österreichischen Akademie der Wissenschaften, Vienna 1969, p. 253 f. (Direktlinks auf p.253, p.254. (in German)
- Peter Fuchs: Kremer, Alfred Freiherr von. In: Neue Deutsche Biographie (NDB). Vol. 13, Duncker & Humblot, Berlin 1982, ISBN 3-428-00194-X, p. 5 f. (Digitalisat).
