= Anizah =

Adnanite Arab tribe

- Adnanite
- Ethnicity: Arab
- Nisba: Anezī
- Location: Saudi Arabia; Kuwait; Bahrain; Qatar; United Arab Emirates; Iraq; Syria; Jordan; Lebanon
- Descended from: Anizah Ibn Asad Ibn Rabīʿa Ibn Nizar Ibn Ma'add Ibn Adnan.
- Parent tribe: Rabīʿa
- Religion: Islam

Anizah or Anazah (Arabic: عنزة, romanized: ʿAnizah, Najdi pronunciation: [ʕni.zah]) is an Arabian tribe in the Arabian Peninsula, Upper Mesopotamia, and the Levant.

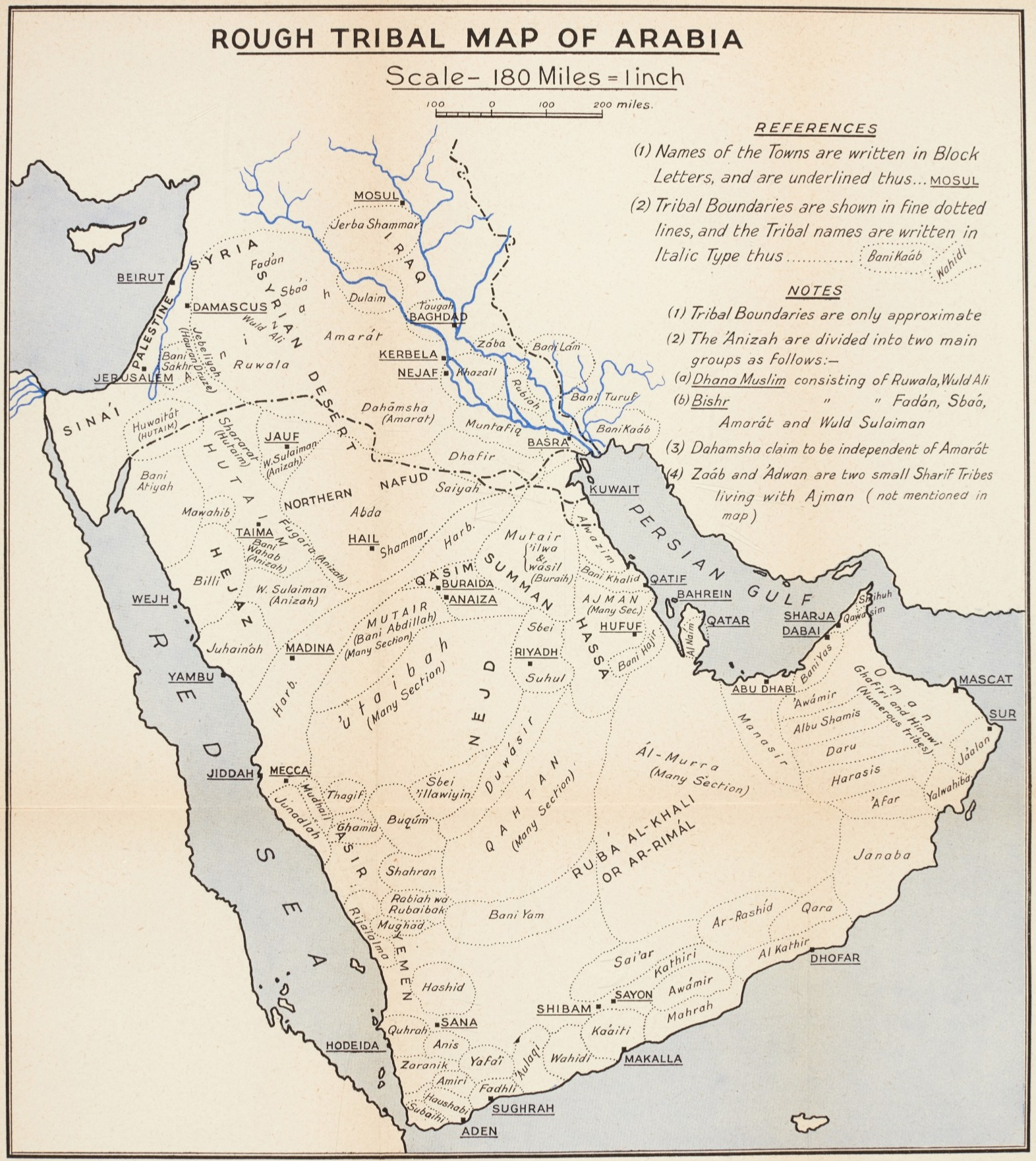
Approximate locations of some of the important tribes and states of the Arabian Peninsula in the early 1900s.

== Genealogy and origins ==
Anizah's existence as an autonomous tribal group, like many prominent modern tribes, predates the rise of Islam in the seventh century. The classical Arab genealogists placed Anizah within the large Rabiʿa branch of the Adnanites alongside the tribes of Abd al-Qays, Banu Bakr, Bani Hanifa, and Taghlib. In the genealogical scheme, Anizah's eponymous ancestor is a great uncle of all of these. One thing for sure is that they come from the same family and most likely of one Patriarch.

Two main branches of Anizah are recorded by the early historians. One branch was nomadic, living in the northern Arabian steppes bordering Syria and Mesopotamia. The other, was sedentary, living within the wadis of the district of Al-Yamama in eastern Najd, just south of their purported cousins, the Bani Hanifa of the Banu Bakr, who inhabited modern-day Riyadh. One of these clans, Bani Hizzan, Families tracing their origin to Anizah through Hizzan still exist in that area today.

The other tribes of Rabiʿa were far more prominent in the events of late pre-Islamic Arabia and the early Islamic era. According to historians such as al-Tabari (10th century), the Anizah joined with Bakr ibn Wa'il under an alliance they called al-Lahazim. Many of these tribes were followers of the Christian faith prior to Islam. Others such as bani Taghlib remained largely Christian even after the Muslim conquest of Mesopotamia and the Levant.

Bahrain's House of Khalifa and Kuwait's House of Sabah royal families both trace their ancestry to this vast tribe. Saudi Arabia's House of Saud trace their ancestry to Anizah's cousin tribe, the Bani Hanifa, which has merged with the larger tribe of Bani Bakr, and are therefore considered members of it as well.

== History ==
=== Anizah in Hejaz ===
According to the historians al-Hamdani and Abu'l-Hasan Bayhaqi, the Anizah tribe settled in the Hijaz region, specifically in Khaybar, at the end of the 10th century AD. The Uyunid prince and poet Ali bin al Mugrab Al Uyuni mentioned the news of the Anizah tribe fighting rulers of Khaybar, the descendants of Ja'far al-Tayyar, and expelled them from it. With the passage of time, a part of the Anizah become urban, while the other part remained on the nomadic lifestyle.

The 13th-century historian Ibn Sa'id al-Maghribi says about himself that he came to the Arabian Peninsula and asked about the rest of the Rabi’a tribes, saying about that 'I entered the Arabian Peninsula and asked: Are there any Rabi'ah tribes left in its regions? They said: There is no one left who rides horses, settles and migrates except for the Anazah, and they are in the regions of Khaybar, and the Banu Shu'bah are famous for highway robbery and tearing down veils in the outskirts of the Hijaz near Yemen and the sea, and the Banu Anz are in the region of Tabalah; and other than that we do not know of in the East or the West'".

The 14th-century historian Ibn Fadlallah al-Umari notes that the Anazah were one of the tribes allied with the Al Fadl, along with several other tribes, the most prominent of which were Khath'am, Adwan, and Dhafeer.

In the 19th century, the Swiss traveler Burckhardt and the British traveler Doughty visited the tribe in their stronghold of Khaybar and gathered from them many details of Bedouin life

=== Anizah in Levant and Mesopotamia ===
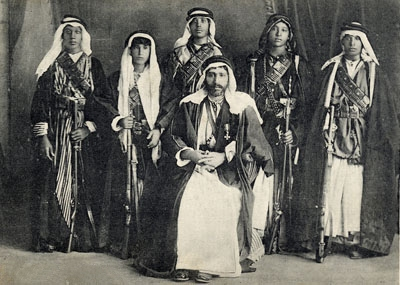
Post-card of Emir Mejhem ibn Meheid, chief of the Anizah tribe near Aleppo with his sons after he was decorated with the Croix de Légion d'honneur on 20 September 1920 by General Gouraud

The Anizah tribe participated with the other Rabi'a tribes in the side of the fourth Rashidun caliph, Alī ibn Abī Ṭālib, in the Battle of Siffin. Historian Naṣr Ibn Muzahim mentions that 4,000 armored warriors joined Ali's army.

The modern tribe of Anizah became prominent in the Ottoman era, as masters of the oasis towns of northwestern Arabia, particularly Khaybar and Al-'Ula. Although not farmers themselves, the Anizah levied crops from the inhabitants, and only spent the winter months in the area, while migrating northwards into southern Syria in the summer months, where they collected tribute from the inhabitants of the Hawran region. The tribute was known as khuwwa ("brotherhood"), and in exchange, the tribesmen pledged to protect the farmers from other tribes. Other clans of the tribe spread across the northern Arabian steppes as far north and east as the Euphrates. According to Encyclopedia of Islam, "it is not known whence they came", while many such as the Western travelers Philby and Anne Blunt simply assumed they had recently migrated from Nejd, having been pushed northwards into Syria by other tribes.

The first Anizah tribe to enter Syria was the Hasana in the mid-18th century. They established themselves as the dominant tribe in the plains around Hama and Homs. Around the same time entered the Wuld Ali in the Hawran. The Ruwallah followed the Wuld Ali in the early 19th century and rivaled them for influence in the Hawran, while the Fad'an and the Sba'a entered the central Syrian plains and often entered into conflict with the Hasana in the early 19th century.

One branch of the Anizah in that area, centered around Al-Jouf and the valley of Wadi Sirhan and extending into Jordan and Syria, became so large and powerful that it practically developed into an independent tribe, known as the Ruwallah. The Ruwallah engaged in battle with other branches of Anizah, and also became the arch-enemy of the large tribe of Shammar, who inhabited roughly the same area and dominated Nejd in the late 19th century after temporarily deposing the Al Saud. A 19th century oral poetic epic telling the tale of a rivalry between two heroes from Shammar and Anizah was published in 1992. The Ruwallah were among the tribes that took part in the "Arab Revolt" against the Ottomans in 1916. Another northern branch of Anizah, the `Amarat, was centered in the deserts of Iraq.

=== Anizah in Nejd ===
The sparse chronicles of Nejd relating to the pre-Wahhabi era relate a process of penetration of the tribe into northern and western Nejd, where they began to claim pastures during the winter months. One 19th-century historian, Ibn La'bun, a descendant of Anizah who went by the tribal appellation of "Al-Wa'ili", recorded the story of the settlement of several `Annizi families in Nejd, which he placed in the 14th century CE. In the 15th century, the region of Al-Qassim in northern Nejd was being rapidly settled through migration and the majority of this activity was by members of Anizah. In the early 18th century the Bedouins of Anizah are recorded to have reached as far as the gates of Riyadh, killing its ruler, Zayd Abazara'a, in battle. This battle was part of a tribal war in which Riyadh and its neighboring villages took sides.

With the rise of the First Saudi State in the late 18th century, Anizah were among the tribes that adopted a favorable attitude towards this new power, but took little active part in supporting it militarily, due to their geographical location. The royal family of Saudi Arabia Al Saud family are from the 'Anizah tribe, with Al Saud having ancestry from Wa'il, the region's native inhabitants as well as the migratory Anizah. The Saud intermarried with their 'Anizah rivals, al Shammar, along with other powerful tribes to solidify their dynasty. Ibn Saud sired dozens of children by his many wives. He had at most four wives at a time, divorcing many times, making sure to marry into many of the noble clans and tribes within his territory, including the chiefs of the Bani Khalid, Ajman, and Shammar tribes, as well as the Al ash-Sheikh.

In the 19th century, Sheikh Mashaan Ibn Hathal was cavalier, leader, and poet who gained his fame from leading the Bedouin clans of the Anizah tribe across the Arabian peninsula and unifying it against the tribe's enemies at the Battle of Al Shimasiyah on 18 June 1825. Sheikh Mashaan died in the battle of Al Shimasiyah but the Anezis won consequently.

=== 20th century ===
Limited settlement of Bedouin tribesmen in nearby towns and villages has always been an ongoing process in the region. Settled families in Anizah are to be found not only in Saudi Arabia, where they are most numerous, but also in Kuwait, Jordan, Iraq, Syria, Lebanon, United Arab Emirates, Qatar, Oman, Bahrain, Ahwaz (Iran) and the West Bank, where the village of Anzah near Jenin is falsely reported to be named after the tribe, though the real meaning of the name means Goat or Hill.

The establishment of the modern borders of the Middle East dealt a severe blow to the Bedouin lifestyle of tribes such as Anizah, which were accustomed to raising their animals over wide areas spanning many modern states. Special arrangements were made in the early 20th century for these tribes, but the vast majority ended up settling within these new states and taking Saudi, Kuwaiti, Iraqi, Lebanese, Syrian, or Jordanian citizenship. These recently settled tribesman are often distinguished from their sedentary cousins by retaining tribal appellations such as al-`Annizi or Al-Ruwaili as their surnames.

== Notable people ==
Among the tribe's members are:

- Al-Qarid Al-Anzi, chieftain of the Rabi`ah tribes in Pre-Islamic Arabia
- Rabi` ibn Al-Afkal, Rashidun commander and governor of Mosul during the reign of Omar
- Matar ibn Hilal Al-Anzi, companion of Muhammad
- Talq ibn Habib Al-Anzi, tābi and hadith narrator
- Yahya ibn ʿUmar Al-Anezī, military leader of the Abbasid Caliphate
- Harith al-Muhasibi, Muslim scholar and founder of the Baghdad School of Islamic philosophy
- Abu al-Atahiya, Abbasid Classical poet
- Abu Saeed bin Al-Arabi, Sunni Sufi Master and Imam of al-Masjid al-Haram in the 10th century AD
- Othman bin Sanad, influential writer, poet and historian who lived in the 18th century AD in eastern Arabia
- Hamad Ibn La'bun, historian who lived in the 19th century AD
- Abdulaziz al-Tuwaijri, Saudi politician
- Sa'd ibn Junaydil, Saudi historian and historical geographer
- Abdul-Rahman Al-Sudais, General President for the Affairs of the Two Holy Mosques and one of the imams of the al-Masjid al-Haram
- Kamel Asaad, Lebanese Speaker of the Parliament & Minister of Education
- Mohammed Salem Al-Anzi, Qatari football player
- Safaq Al-Anzi, Saudi professional shooter
- Farouk Omar, Iraqi historian

== Notable families ==
The Anizah tribe is historically divided into urban and nomadic families, the most prominent of which are:

=== settled families ===
- Al-Saud of the Mrudah clan : rulers of Saudi Arabia, their relation to Anizah is disputed and is claimed to be maternal, Al Saud officially and are locally recognized paternally as part of Banu Hanifa.
- Al-Sabah of Utub Alliance : rulers of Kuwait
- Al-Khalifa of Utub Alliance : rulers of Bahrain
- El Assaad Family/AlSaghir dynasty : former rulers of Jabal Amil 1639 – 1971
- Abalkhail of Al Najied clan : Former rulers of Buraydah and parts of the Al-Qassim region 1863 – 1908
- Al-Mudlij clan : Rulers and governors Harmah late 14th century – present
- Al-Abu Rabah clan : Founder of Huraymila in the 17th century

=== Bedouin or semi-Bedouin families ===
- Al-Hathal : the sheikhs of Al-Hblan branch of Anizah. In the eleventh century AH/17th century CE, their grandfather Hathal Ibn Adenan led the Tribes of Anizah. Hathal Ibn Adenan was given the title of (Sheikh Al-Shuyoukh) by the Sheriff of Makkah, Saad Ibn Zeid (1666-1705).

Several stories about the way Hathal obtained the Sheikhdom were told, however Ibn Abar a notable Anezi Historian believes that history tells us that Hathal came to power when Makkah's Sharif was unable to collect the zakat of one of the tribes near Makkah and was disturbed about it, here Sheikh Hathal emerged and pledged to the sheriff to bring him the zakat of this tribe, and in fact this was done for him, and from here he was appointed as a general sheikh of the tribe of Anizah and was given the seal and the bundle of Sheikhdom. Ibn Abar quoted on this saying :

"It is for the benefit of this narration that it is told from various perspectives with agreement and consensus on the cause and content, and it is for the purpose of collecting zakat from this tribe and bringing it to the Sharif, and we have the right to ask why sheikh Hathal pledged to carry out this mission. Did Sheikh Hathal have a personal contact with the Sharif, or did he have knowledge and connections with him? Was he the one who offered this service on his own initiative, or was it something that was brought to his attention? Why was the actual version of this story not kept in the same way over and over again? There are a lot of unanswered questions and mysterious occurrences around the circumstances of this case that we don't know about! There is no doubt, however, that the man was of enormous importance and presence among the people of his tribe, and that he was not an average person at the time, and that something like this prompted him to assume the Sheikhdom of this vast, great, and ancient tribe."

Hathal had two sons who were both considered Sheikhs : Sheikh Abdullah Ibn Hathal, and Sheikh Mndeel Al-Shuja' Or Mndeel the Brave. Their progeny are still regarded to be the Sheikhs of Anizah and are still given the honorary title of the Sheikhs of Shuyoukh of Anizah.

- Al-Awaji : sheikh of the tribe of Walad Suleiman,
- Al-Aida : sheikh of the tribe of Walad Ali,
- Al-Qaqa’a : sheikh of al-Qa’qa’ah from al-Rawla,
- Ibn Mujlad : sheikh of Al-Dahamisha,
- Al-Rafdi : Sheikh of Al-Salqa,
- Ibn Bakr : Sheikh of Al-Suwaylmat from Al-Dahamsheh,
- Ibn Dhbayan : Sheikh of Al-Mehlef of Al-Dahamsheh,
- Al-Taiyar : from the sheikhs of Walad Ali,
- Ibn Ghabin : Sheikh of Dana Kahil from Al-Fadaan,
- Ibn Muhaid : Sheikh of Al-Fadaan,
- Ibn Quaishish : Sheikh of Al-Kharsa and currently is also the sheikh of Dana Majid from Al-Fadaan,
- Ibn Huraymis : Sheikh Al-Aqaqrah from Al-Fadaan,
- Ibn Murshid : Sheikh of Sbaee,
- Ibn Hudayb : Sheikh of Al-Abedah from Sba’ah,
- Ibn Aida : Sheikh of Al-Rasaleen from Sba’ah,
- Al Mana : From the Sheikhs of Al-Mehlef
- Ibn Shaalan : the sheikh of Al-Ruwullah, including Nuri Al Shalaan
- Ibn Melhem : the Sheikh of Al-Manabaha,
- Ibn Swailem : from the Sheikhs of Walad Suleiman,
- Al-Faqeer : the Sheikh of Al-Faqara from Al-Manabha,
- Ibn Ya’ish : the Sheikh of Al-Masalikh from Al-Manabha,
- Ibn Dhwehr : from the sheikhs of Walad Suleiman,
- Ibn Ma’jil : the Sheikh of Al-Ashaja’ah from Al-Mehlef,
- Ibn Jandal : Sheikh Al-Sawalmeh from Al-Mehlef,
- Ibn Majid : the sheikh of Al-Abadla, from the Mehlef,
- Ibn Khael : the sheikh of the Tawala’, from the Walad Ali,
- Al-Murtaed : the sheikh of Al-Yemnah, from the Walad of Sulayman,
- Ibn Nasir : the sheikh of al-Mr’ad, from al-Rawla.

== See also ==
- Taghlib
- Bedouin
- Rabi`ah
- Ruwallah
- Banu Bakr
- Banu Hanifa
- Al Jalahma
- Ibn Sbyel
- Unaizah
