= Ibn Sbyel =

Ibn Sbyel or Ibn Sbe'yel or AlSbyel (Arabic ابن سبيل) are a family from the Al-Qmesah clan, from the Adnanite tribe of `Anizzah. The family is notable for their connection to the Ma’anagi Arabian horse studs :

- Ma’anagi Sbyeli stud .

== Ma'anagi Sbyeli Stud ==
The Ma'anagi Sbyeli stud is one of the oldest Arabian horse studs.
