= Banu Dhuhl =

Arab tribe

Banu Dhuhl بنو ذهل
- Adnanites
- Banner of Banu Dhuhl
- Ethnicity: Arab
- Nisba: Al-Dhuhli
- Location: Arabian Peninsula
- Descended from: Dhuhl ibn Tha'laba
- Parent tribe: Banu Bakr
- Religion: Paganism, later Islam

Banu Dhuhl (Arabic: بنو ذهل) also known as Dhuhal, was an Adnanite Arab tribe descended from Dhuhal ibn Tha'laba.

The tribe of Dhuhl was a branch of the Banu Bakr tribe, less prominent than the other Bakri tribes like the Banu Ijl and Banu Shayban. Although the Banu Dhuhl existed before Islam, there is scant mention in the pre-Islamic Ayyam al-Arab accounts. But, well-known figures of the Dhuhl are recorded in the early Islamic period. Their region of control is not exactly known, thought a branch of the Dhuhl were known to have settled in al-Yamama.

The lineage of the tribe was Dhuhl ibn Tha'laba ibn Ukaba ibn Sa'b ibn Ali ibn Bakr ibn Wa'il ibn Qasit ibn Hanab ibn Afsa ibn Da'mi ibn Jadila ibn Asad ibn Rabi'a ibn Nizar ibn Ma'ad ibn Adnan. Therefore, they are Adnanites.

== See also ==
- Pre-Islamic Arabia
- Tribes of Arabia
