= Tarafa =

Bahraini poet (0543–0569)

- Born: Tarafa ibn al-‘Abd ibn Sufyān ibn Sa‘d Abū ‘Amr al-Bakrī al-Wā’ilī c. 543; Bahrain, Arabia
- Died: c. 569; Bahrain, Arabia
- Occupation: Poet
- Writing career
- Language: Arabic
- Period: Pre-Islamic
- Genres: Panegyrics, Satire
- Notable work: Mu'allaqat

Ṭarafah ibn al-ʿAbd ibn Sufyān (Arabic: طرفة بن العبد بن سفيان; c. 543 – c. 569), commonly known as Tarafa, was a 6th-century pre-Islamic Arabian poet of the tribe of Bakr ibn Wa'il. He is celebrated as one of the seven poets of the Mu'allaqat, the renowned corpus of pre-Islamic odes.

Known for his rebellious nature, biting satire, and his early death following a conflict with the Lakhmid king Amr ibn Hind, he was traditionally referred to in Arabic literary tradition as al-Ghulām al-Qatīl ("the murdered youth").

== Life ==
Ṭarafah was the half-brother or nephew of the elegist Al-Khirniq bint Badr. He traveled with his uncle Al-Mutalammis to the court of the king of Al-Hirah, ʿAmr ibn Hind, and there became companion to the king's brother. According to one legend, having ridiculed the king in some verses he was sent with a letter to the ruler of Bahrayn, and, in accordance with the instructions contained in the letter, was buried alive.

Tarafa's bitter tongue was destined to cost him dear.

Fatigued and disgusted by the rigid ceremony of the court, he improvised a satire in which he said:-

"Would that we had instead of 'Amr
A milch-ewe bleating round our tent"

Shortly afterwards he happened to be seated at table opposite the king's sister. Struck with her beauty, he exclaimed:-

"Behold, she has come back to me,
My fair gazelle whose ear-rings shine;
Had not the king been sitting here,
I would have pressed her lips to mine !"

'Amr b. Hind was a man of violent and implacable temper. Tarafa's satire had already been reported to him, and this new impertinence added fuel to his wrath. Sending for Tarafa and Mutalammis, he granted them leave to visit their homes, and gave to each of them a sealed letter addressed to the governor of Bahrayn. When they had passed outside the city the suspicions of Mutalammis were aroused. As neither he nor his companion could read, he handed his own letter to a boy of Hira and learned that it contained orders to bury him alive. Thereupon he flung the treacherous missive into the stream and implored Tarafa to do likewise. Tarafa refused to break the royal seal. He continued his journey to Bahrayn, where he was thrown into prison and executed.

— Nicholson, A literary history of the Arabs

== Poetry and themes ==
Ṭarafah's literary reputation rests primarily on his long Mu'allaqa, an ode of over one hundred lines rhyming in the letter dāl. The poem is structured around three core themes: the physical journey through the desert, a confrontation with mortality, and personal conflict with his kinsmen.

The central section of the ode contains an exhaustive, anatomical description of his she-camel, spanning nearly thirty verses. In classical Arabic literary commentary, this passage is recognized as one of the most sustained descriptions of a riding beast in pre-Islamic poetry, depicting the animal through architectural and mechanical similes.

A significant portion of his surviving poetry addresses human mortality and social alienation. In his Mu'allaqa, Ṭarafah presents an existential argument advocating the pursuit of material pleasures, generosity, and warfare before death, arguing that the grave treats the miserly recluse and the free-spending warrior identically. He also details his estrangement from his own clan, the Banu Bakr, lamenting his mistreatment and isolation by his cousin Mālik, which produced his widely cited line regarding the exceptional pain inflicted by one's own kin (dhulm dhawī al-qurbā).

== Legacy ==
In classical Arabic literary criticism, Ṭarafah was consistently ranked in the highest tier of pre-Islamic poets. Ibn Sallām al-Jumaḥī (d. 846) placed him in the first rank (al-ṭabaqah al-ūlā) of Jahili poets in his Tabaqat Fuhul al-Shu'ara, grouping him with Imru' al-Qais, Zuhayr bin Abi Sulma, and Al-Nabigha. Ibn Qutaybah (d. 889) considered him the most gifted poet of his generation, observing that despite his death at an early age, his craftsmanship matched that of long-lived poets.

The Islamic prophet Muhammad occasionally quoted the famous closing line of Ṭarafah's Mu'allaqa: "Days shall disclose to you what was unknown / and news shall reach you through hands you never tasked." In Hadith traditions recorded by al-Tirmidhi and Ahmad ibn Hanbal on the authority of Aisha, this couplet was documented as one of the few instances where Muhammad recited secular pre-Islamic poetry.

The circumstances of his execution gave rise to the proverbial Arabic idiom ṣaḥīfat al-Mutalammis ("the letter of al-Mutalammis"), used to describe carrying one's own death warrant or walking unwittingly into peril.

== Modern Translations ==
- The Divans of the Six Ancient Arabic Poets, Ennabiga, 'Antara, Tharafa, Zuhair, 'Alqama and Imruulqais, Trübner & co., London, 1870 (in English); anthology of diwan (collected poems) edited by Wilhelm Ahlwardt.

While some of his poems have been translated into Latin with notes by B. Vandenhoff (Berlin, 1895), both Tharafa and the poet Imru al-Qais were not included by Theodor Nöldeke in his Fünf Moallaqat, übersetzt und erklärt (Vienna, 1899-1901).

- The seven golden odes of pagan Arabia : known also as the Moallakat; An English translation by Anne Blunt, Lady; Wilfrid Scawen Blunt (London, Chiswick Press, 1903).

== References and external links ==
- University at Albany: The Mu'Allaqa of Ibn Tarafa
- Mohammadi Malayeri, M.: Tarikh va Farhang-e Iran Vol. I, Yazdan Publishers, Tehran 1372 Hsh. pp. 242، 267، 291، 292، 374.
- Nicholson, Reynold Alleyne (1907). A literary History of the Arabs. London: T.F. Unwin. pp. 44, 101, 107–9, 128, 138, 308.
