= Anmar =

Arabic tribe consisting mainly of the Adnanite Arabs

Anmar (Arabic: أنمار, lit. 'clean water') is an Arabic tribe consisting mainly of the Adnanite Arabs.

While Mudar was supposed to have a son, Anmar's tribes had perished. The Prophet says Anmar was one of the tribes of Yemen, a son of Saba the Qahtanite.

One of Anmar ibn Nizar's children, Khath'am, managed to survive. He was the ancestor of the tribe named after him.
