= Al-Nu'man III ibn al-Mundhir =

Lakhmid king of al-Hirah (582 – c. 602)

- King of the Lakhmid state
- Reign: CE 580–602
- Predecessor: Al-Mundhir IV
- Successor: Iyas ibn Qabisah al-Ta'i (non-dynastic governor) with Nakhiragan (Persian governor)
- Born: c. 552
- Died: c. 609 (age 57); Ctesiphon, Sassanid Empire
- Issue: Hind bint al-Nuʿmān
- House: Lakhmids
- Father: Al-Mundhir IV ibn al-Mundhir
- Religion: Nestorian Christianity

Al-Nuʿmān III ibn al-Mundhir (Arabic: النعمان بن المنذر), also transcribed Naʿaman, Nuʿaman and Noman and often known by the patronymic Abu Qabus (أبو قابوس), was the last Lakhmid king of al-Hirah (582 – c. 602) and a Nestorian Christian Arab. He is considered one of the most important Lakhmid rulers.

== Biography ==
=== Childhood and siblings ===
Al-Nu'man was the son of al-Mundhir IV ibn al-Mundhir (r. 575–580) and Salma. She was the daughter of a Jewish goldsmith, Wa'il ibn Atiyyah, from Fadak, and had been a slave of al-Harith ibn Hisn, of the Banu Kalb tribe. The base, and even servile, origin of his mother was often used to mock al-Nu'man by contemporary poets. Furthermore, the Arabic sources unanimously portray al-Nu'man as a particularly ugly individual, and remark on his red hair, small stature, and mottled skin.

According to al-Tabari, he was reared in childhood by the Christian poet Adi ibn Zayd, who with his brothers served as secretaries of Arab affairs for the Lakhmids' overlord, the Sasanian king. He had numerous brothers—11 or 12 according to the sources—but only one of them, his half-brother al-Aswad, who was raised by the noble clan of the Banu Marina, seems to have been a figure of any consequence.

=== Reign ===
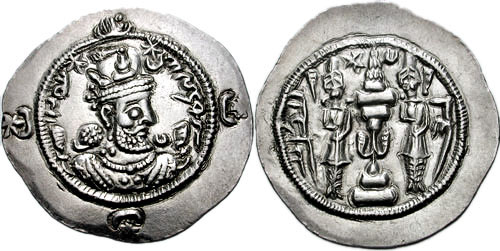
Coin of Hormizd IV (r. 579–590)

Al-Nu'man's succession in 580 was not unopposed, as the clan of Banu Marina backed his brother al-Aswad. The Sasanian monarch, Hormizd IV (r. 579–590), appointed Iyas ibn Qabisah al-Ta'i as interim governor, while a suitable candidate was sought among the Lakhmid dynasty. The Arabic sources report that the intervention of Adi ibn Ziyad was decisive: Adi had the other sons of al-Mundhir present themselves first to Hormizd, who asked them whether they could fulfill the duties of the office. To this they all replied, schooled by Adi, "We can control the Arabs for you, except al-Nu'man". When al-Nu'man came last, he confidently promised to not only control the Arabs, but also his siblings, boasting "If I can't cope with them, then I can't cope with anyone!" Pleased with his answer, Hormizd appointed him king and gave him a gold-and-pearl encrusted crown worth 60,000 dirhams to confirm his position.

Al-Nu'man was a strong and energetic ruler, but not much is known about his reign. He was faced with divisions among the tribes and clans subject to him. Thus when he tried to remove the right to lead a division into battle (the so-called ridāfa) from the Yarbu, a subtribe of the Banu Tamim, and give it to the Darim, another subtribe, this provoked a violent clash between the two at Tikhfa. Despite the support given by al-Nu'man to the Darim, the Yarbu won and even took prisoner al-Nu'man's brother and son, who had to be ransomed for one thousand camels.

Unlike his predecessors, al-Nu'man was scarcely concerned with the Lakhmids' traditional Arab rivals, the Ghassanids, as the latter had fallen out with their Byzantine overlords in c. 580 and been eliminated as a power factor in the region. The only recorded military activity of al-Nu'man is an attack on the Byzantine fortress of Circesium during the Byzantine–Sasanian War of 572–591. According to Arab accounts, al-Nu'man gave refuge to Hormizd's son, Khosrow II (r. 591–628), during his flight from the usurper Bahram Chobin in 590, and fought alongside him in a battle at al-Nahrawan against the usurper's forces.

=== Downfall, death and aftermath ===
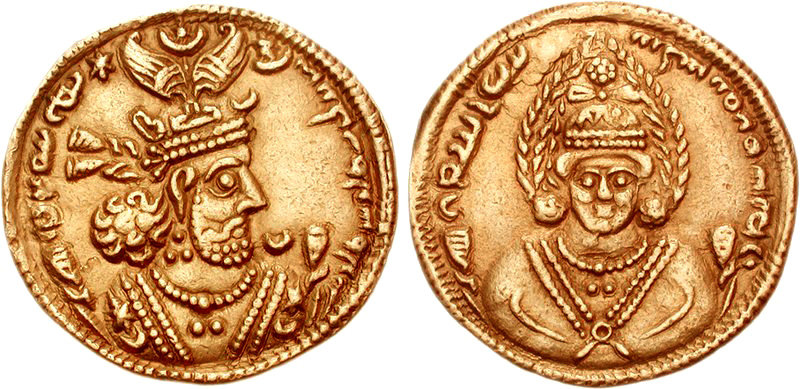
Coin of Khosrow II (r. 591–628)

Despite the assistance rendered to Khosrow, after the latter was restored to his throne, the two fell out. The sources provide no clear reason for this, attributing their dispute to al-Nu'man's refusal to give his horse to Khosrow or marry one of his daughters, Hind, to one of Khosrow's relatives. More likely it had to do with the prior falling out between al-Nu'man and his chief councillor, Adi ibn Zayd, who fell under suspicion of plotting against al-Nu'man and was executed. Adi's son, who had Khosrow's ear, then managed to turn the Persian ruler against al-Nu'man. The latter's conversion to Nestorian Christianity may also have been a factor, since Khosrow distrusted the rising influence of Christians in his own court. On the other hand, the Nestorian branch of Christianity was generally seen with less hostility by the Sasanian rulers, and Khosrow himself was married to a Christian, Shirin.

Once he became aware of Khosrow's hostility, Al-Nu'man fled his capital and sought refuge among the Banu Bakr, but was eventually forced to surrender and was executed by being crushed by elephants. However, according to a Syriac chronicle, Khosrau invited Nu'man to a feast where he was dishonored and trapped; another Syriac chronicle states that Khosrow captured Nu'man along with his sons, who then were poisoned.

The end of al-Nu'man's reign is generally placed in c. 602 by modern scholars. After his arrest, Khosrow entirely removed the Lakhmids from power and entrusted the rule of al-Hira to Iyas ibn Qabisah al-Ta'i. This marked the end of the Lakhmid dynasty, which had effectively shielded Persia against the Arab tribes for almost three centuries. Very quickly, the ill effects of this made themselves felt, when the Bakr, dissatisfied with Iyas, rose in revolt, and defeated a Persian force at the Battle of Dhi Qar. Coupled with increasing instability in Persia proper after the downfall of Khosrow in 628, these events heralded the decisive Battle of Qadisiyya in 636 and the Arab conquest of Persia.

== Legacy ==
According to Irfan Shahîd, in the later histories, al-Nu'man ibn al-Mundhir's reign "was the most memorable after that of his grandfather, al-Mundhir III". The Lakhmid capital of al-Hira continued to be the major Arab cultural centre of its time, particularly through al-Nu'man's patronage of poets, most notably Adi ibn Zayd and the panegyrist al-Nabigha.

Al-Nu'man was also the first to openly convert to Christianity, likely after the conclusion of the peace with Byzantium in 591. This enhanced al-Hira's importance as a major Nestorian Christian centre, particularly for missionary activities in the Persian Gulf and Eastern Arabia, and was the seat of a bishopric.

== See also ==
- Fijar Wars
- Battle of Dhi Qar
- Sabrisho I

== Sources ==
- Bosworth, C. E. (1983). "Iran and the Arabs Before Islam". In Yarshater, Ehsan (ed.). The Cambridge History of Iran: The Seleucid, Parthian and Sasanian Periods. Vol. 3(1). Cambridge: Cambridge University Press. pp. 593–612. ISBN 0-521-20092-X.
- Bosworth, C. E., ed. (1999). The History of al-Ṭabarī, Volume V: The Sāsānids, the Byzantines, the Lakhmids, and Yemen. SUNY Series in Near Eastern Studies. Albany, New York: State University of New York Press. ISBN 978-0-7914-4355-2.
- Rothstein, Gustav (1899). Die Dynastie der Lahmiden in al-Hîra. Ein Versuch zur arabisch-persichen Geschichte zur Zeit der Sasaniden [The Dynasty of the Lakhmids at al-Hira. An Essay on Arab–Persian History at the Time of the Sasanids] (in German). Berlin: Reuther & Reichard.
- Shahîd, Irfan (1995). "al-Nuʿman (III) b. al-Mund̲h̲ir". In Bosworth, C. E.; van Donzel, E.; Heinrichs, W. P. & Lecomte, G. (eds.). The Encyclopaedia of Islam, Second Edition. Volume VIII: Ned–Sam. Leiden: E. J. Brill. pp. 119–120. doi:10.1163/1573-3912_islam_SIM_5979. ISBN 978-90-04-09834-3.
