= Rabi'a ibn Nizar =

Patriarch of one branch of the North Arabian tribes

Rabīʿa ibn Nizar (Arabic: ربيعة بن نزار) is the patriarch of one of two main branches of the "North Arabian" (Adnanite) tribes, the other branch being founded by Mudhar.

== Branches ==
According to the classical Arab genealogists, the following are the important branches of Rabīʿa:

- Abd al-Qays
- Anizah
- Anz ibn Wa'il
- Banu Bakr, which also included the following sub-tribes
  - Banu Hanifa
  - Banu Shayban
  - Banu Qays ibn Tha'laba
  - Taym Allah (or Taym Allat)
  - Banu Yashkur
- Taghlib
- al-Nammir ibn Qasit

== Location ==
Like the rest of the Adnanite Arabs, legend has it that Rabīʿa's original homelands were in the Tihamah region of western Arabia, from which Rabīʿa migrated northwards and eastwards. Abd al-Qays were one of the inhabitants of the region of Eastern Arabia, including the modern-day islands of Bahrain, and were mostly sedentary.

Bakr's lands stretched from al-Yamama (the region around modern-day Riyadh) to northwestern Mesopotamia. The main body of the tribe was bedouin, but a powerful and autonomous sedentary sub-tribe of Bakr also resided in al-Yamama, the Bani Hanifa.

Taghlib resided on the eastern banks of the Euphrates, and al-Nammir are said to have been their clients. Anz inhabited southern Arabia, and are said to have been decimated by the plague in the 13th century, though a tribe named "Rabīʿa" in modern-day 'Asir is said to be its descendant.

Anazah was divided into a sedentary section in southern Yamama and a bedouin section further north.

Abd al-Qays, Taghlib, al-Nammir, and some sections of Bakr were mostly Christian before Islam, with Taghlib remaining a Christian tribe for some time afterwards as well. Anazah and Bakr are said to have worshiped an idol by the name of al-Sa'eer.

=== Rabīʿa in Egypt ===
During the Abbasid era, many members of Bani Hanifa and related tribesmen from Bakr ibn Wa'il migrated from al-Yamama to southern Egypt, where they dominated the gold-mines of Wadi Allaqi near Aswan. While in Egypt, the tribesmen went by the collective name of "Rabi'a" and inter-married with indigenous tribes in the area such as the Beja peoples. Among their descendants are the tribe of Banu Kanz (also known as the Kunooz), who take their name from Kanz al-Dawlah of Bani Hanifa, the leader of Rabi'a in Egypt during the Fatimid era.

== Some notable people ==
- Amr ibn Kulthum
- Suhayb al-Rumi
- Al-Muthanna ibn Haritha
- Abu Layla al-Muhalhel
- Tarafa
- Bahira
- Al-A'sha
- Al-Harith ibn Hilliza al-Yashkuri
- Musaylimah
- Qatada ibn Di'ama
- Malik ibn Tawk
- Khalid ibn Yazid al-Shaybani
- Yazid ibn Mazyad al-Shaybani
- Ma'n ibn Za'ida al-Shaybani
- Abu Dulaf al-Ijli
- Ahmad ibn Hanbal
- Al-Akhtal
- Abu al-Atahiya
- Harith al-Muhasibi
- Haly Abenragel
- Badi' al-Zaman al-Hamadani
- Abu Firas al-Hamdani
- Awn al-Din ibn Hubayra
- Al-Bakri
- Ibn 'Abd al-Barr
- Said al-Andalusi
- Abdullah bin Ali Al Uyuni
- Ibn Saud
- Abdul-Rahman Al-Sudais
- Mohammed bin Ali Aba Al Khail

== Royal families which stem from the Rabi'a tribe ==
- Dulafid dynasty
- Vali dynasty
- Uyunid dynasty
- Hamdanid dynasty
- Al Saud, rulers of Saudi Arabia
- Al Khalifa, rulers of Bahrain
- Al Sabah, rulers of Kuwait
- El Assaad Family
- Banu Kanz
- Shirvanshah
- Taifa of Saltés and Huelva
