= Wadi Allaqi =

Biosphere reserve in Egypt

Wadi Allaqi, (Arabic: وادي العلاقي) also transliterated as Wadi Allaqui or Wadi Alalaqi, is a wadi (dry river) in southern Egypt. It begins in Sudan below the Halaib Triangle, and its mouth is south of Aswan on the eastern shore of Lake Nasser.

Wadi Allaqi is the major dry river in the southeastern part of the Eastern Desert of Egypt, draining the area from the hills near the Red Sea to the valley of the Nile. With a length of 250 km (160 mi), the wadi is used by the nomadic Bejas who live in the area – about 1,000 members of the Ababda and Bisharyn tribes as of 2003 – to graze livestock, for the production of charcoal for fuel, to collect medicinal plants, for quarrying for copper and nickel and for agriculture on a small scale. As of 1989 the area has been a nature reserve managed by the Egyptian Environmental Affairs Agency. It was declared a Biosphere Reserve by UNESCO in 1993.

Wadi Allaqi is famous for gold and rock inscriptions. A noteworthy rock inscription site is found at Umm Ashira. A Middle Kingdom of Egypt fortress was built at Quban, near the original wadi's mouth, with another fortress built at Ikkur. A stela attributed to New Kingdom of Egypt Ramesses II discovered near Quban references the search and discovery of water for gold laborers. That well is located 60 km into Wadi Allaqi, near Umm Ashira, and past the now flooded portion of the wadi now constituting Lake Nasser.

Gold deposits and mining are noteworthy in the upper parts of Wadi Allaqi, particularly at Hairiri, Heimur, Umm Garaiyat, Marahig, Seiga, Shoshoba, and Abu Fas. Gold and emeralds were extracted by chattel slaves between the 9th and 13th centuries. Gold mining in the Early Arab Period intensified under the rule of Ahmad ibn Tulun. Of note are two forts built during this period at Derahib.

== See also ==
- Arabian-Nubian Shield
