= Banu Bakr =

Arabian tribe belonging to the Rabi'ah branch

Banu Bakr بنو بكر
- Rabi'aite Arab tribe
- Location: Ancient Arabia
- Descended from: Bakr bin Wael bin Qasit bin Hinb bin Afsa bin Du'mi bin Jadila bin Asad bin Rabi'a ibn Nizar
- Parent tribe: Rabi'a ibn Nizar
- Branches: Banu Hanifa; Banu 'Ijl; Banu Shayban; Banu Dhuhl; Banu Qais; Banu Taym al-Lat; Banu Zimman; Banu Yashkur
- Religion: Islam

Map of the Arabian Peninsula in 600 AD, showing the various Arab tribes and their areas of settlement. The Lakhmids (yellow) formed an Arab monarchy as clients of the Sasanian Empire, while the Ghassanids (red) formed an Arab monarchy as clients of the Roman Empire A map published by the British academic Harold Dixon during World War I, showing the presence of the Arab tribes in West Asia, 1914

The Banu Bakr bin Wa'il (Arabic: بنو بكر بن وائل Banū Bakr ibn Wā'il), or simply Banu Bakr, today known as Bani Bakr is an Arabian tribe belonging to the large Rabi'ah, a branch of Adnanite tribe. It is registered as one of the oldest and most ancient Arab gatherings. The tribe is reputed to have engaged in many of the major wars of pre-Islamic Arabia, including the Basus War and the First Battle of Kulab. They also defeated the Sasanian Empire at the Battle of Dhi Qar.

The Banu Bakr tribe along with their cousins Taghlib are under the name Bani Bakr. Most of them today live in Arabia in Najd, north Hejaz, north of the Arabian peninsula and a small amount across the rest of the Middle East.

The pre-Islamic poet Tarafah was a Bakri.

== The Man ==
Bakr Bin Wael was the oldest son for Wael from his Bakry wife. They come from a lineage of an Arab clan that named their first born sons Bakr in reference to their ancestor Bakr the Patriarch. Since young age, Wael and his brothers, set their sons to be desert warriors. Due to his fine and master characteristics, Wael put his son Bakr in charge of the clan. Bakr was a sleek horseman yet strong enough to travel long distances. As Bakr got older, he was able to form a fighting force along with his family members and other Arabs into a nomadic federation just as Wael advised. Bakr himself started a war clan along with Anizah and Banu Hanifa and few other Arab tribes. They seized the waterways and fought for their cattle's grazeland. They produced dairy and exported wool. They put up traveler caravans and did well at trade and transportation across Arabia; especially between Hejaz and Mesopotamia. Basically they stationed near Hafar al-Batin and used that region as a permanent camp ground. Later on in life, as the clan grew larger in numbers, they became known as Banu Bakr bin Wael since he started his own dynasty in Iraq; disengaging from the father tribe in Hejaz and its sheikhdom authority Banu Bakr ibn Abd Manat.

== Homelands ==
Banu Bakr's original lands were in Najd, in central Arabia, but most of the tribe's bedouin sections migrated northwards before Islam after winning the Battle of Dhi Qar against the Sasanian Empire, and settled in the area of Upper Mesopotamia, on the upper Euphrates. Later on they pushed against the Persians eastward and managed to conquer the Tigris banks as well; where they gained a foothold of the whole Mesopotamia territory. It won't be long before they headed northwards and reached the Anatolian Valley and the Caucasus. That's where the region of Diyar Bakr, and later the city of Diyarbakır in southern Turkey take their names from; Banu Bakr. Old sources mentioned that their cattle grazed in Bakuriani during the warm summer seasons as well.

The tribe is distinct from their distant cousins Bani Bakr ibn Abd Manat of Tihamah, who lived in the Hejaz and the costal area and had important interactions with Prophet Muhammad.

The nomadic tribe converted to Sunni Islam during the Umayyad and Abbasid eras in the 8th century. They had feud with many Shia tribes of southern Iraq, especially over the water ways, which went on until the Siege of Baghdad. In late 1257, as the Mongolian army marched towards Baghdad, Banu Bakr, just like the rest of Sunni Arab tribes, has had already retreated southwest towards inner Arabia along the first exiting caravan. They had a few months head up on the Mongolian attack thus surviving the entire war while on the move. They were never able to recover their losses from the Mongolian blow by Hulegu Khan which dried up their lands thus driving them along with their cattle out of Mesopotamia. Most of them ended up resettling in the Hauran region where they reside until this day.

== History ==
=== Bakry ===
The Bakry concept belongs to those who were born to the Bakr tribe. The legend Bakr comes from Pre-Islamic Arabia. It is a lineage of Arab nomads who descend from one man, Bakr the Patriarch, that birthed off his own dynasty. Thus, they're referred to as the Bakr Clan; Banu Bakr (sons of Bakr)).

=== Muhammad's era ===
During the Islamic Prophet Muhammad's era the Banu Bakr tribe was involved in various military conflicts. They had tens of militant factions that roamed the Middle East. Through intentional polygamy, they grew quickly in numbers. They put their youngsters into war. They were swift and fit due to their background. All together, they established vital trade routes and succeeded at holding their grounds. Using their Arabian stallions and Damascusian steel swords, they became important for traveling caravans and provided paid security services for the protection of goods and camel cargo. Desert bandits along with lion and hyena attacks were a problem at the time. But their competition over road control caused feuds with other pagan, Jewish, and Nazarene Arab tribes. Severe horror stories come out of those wars. They had lost a high number of men in battles so their young took to the fight. At some point, it became common to hear of the Banu Bakr boys and young men attacking first due to their bedouin and firm nature. They engaged in retaliatory wars attacks for decades at a time. They were usually led by another young man or simply followed the instructions of their tribal men or women. The Basus War was triggered by the poem of one of their women. Although a wise group of people, prophet Muhammad referred to their actions as Ungodly and heretical.

=== Post Muhammad ===
Banu Bakr accepted Islam as the law of the land and went on with the rest of Arabs on the Islamic conquest; rather, they were some of the first ones to adventure into attacking neighboring hostile nations. They joined the Islamic armies of Caliph Omar and attacked the Roman and Persian Empires relentlessly. The Bakry Horsemen and cavalry were the guides and headed the marching armies in the conquest of the Levant. That proved well for them as they coveted most of the war booty after battle victories. Eventually, they were admitted into the Ottoman Empire and fought for the Ottoman dynasty and served as the officer class until World War one. Some of them went up to mainland Turkey while most stayed back south in the Arab lands. Later on, many traveled to Europe and the Americas as well.

== Branches ==
The following are some of the related and sub-tribes of Bakr ibn Wa'il in the pre-Islamic and early-Islamic eras:

- Adnanite, Hejaz or "Northwestern Arabian" (Northern Arabian Red Sea coast)
  - Rabi`ah (ربيعة), migrated northwards and eastwards from Hejaz, for example to Diyar Rabi'a in Al-Jazira, Mesopotamia
    - Banu Bakr ibn Abd Manat, the ancient base in Jeddah, Hejaz, and Tihamah.
    - Bani Shahr, Tehama and Hejaz.
    - Bakr ibn Wa'il, Al-Yamama, bedouin sections migrated before Islam to Diyar Bakr in Al-Jazira. Today in Hauran and Jordan valley (direct lineage of Bakr Bin Wael). Were an Ottoman army brigade until the 1900s.
    - Banu Bakr Hadhramaut, the Yafa'a area faction. Now independent from Sanaa's authority.
    - Banu Hanifa - mostly sedentary, were the principal tribe of Al-Yamama.
    - Banu Shayban - mostly nomadic (bedouin), led the Battle of Dhi Qar against the Sassanid Persians in southern Iraq prior to Islam. The jurist Ahmad ibn Hanbal claimed descent from this tribe.
    - Banu Qays ibn Tha'labah - Capital section of Riyadh. They were bedouin and sedentary. Now the inhabitants of the town of Manfuha. The pre-Islamic poets al-A'sha and Tarafah were among its members.
      - Banu Yashkur - bedouin and sedentary, inhabitants of Al-Yamama. Al-Harith ibn Hillizah, one of the purported authors of the Seven Hanged Poems of pre-Islamic Arabia, was a member of Yashkur. Now in Al Hafuf and [Dammam].
      - Banu 'Ijl - mostly bedouin, located in Al-Yamama and the southern borders of Mesopotamia.
      - Ghablama - mostly bedouin, located in Kirkuk and the southern borders of Mesopotamia.
    - Banu Dhuhal in Mecca
    - Abdul Qays in Mecca
    - Anazzah northern Saudi Arabia towards the Syrian desert and eastern Jordan.

In eastern Najd:

- Taghlib ibn Wa'il, migrated northwards to the Jazirah plain in northern Mesopotamia in the 6th century.
- Anz ibn Wa'il
- al-Nammir ibn Qasit
