= List of wars and battles in pre-Islamic Arabia =

The following is an incomplete list of the known conflicts, including the battles and wars, that characterized pre-Islamic Arabia.

Pre-Islamic Arabian warfare was organized around the tribal structure of most of society in this time and place. For this reason, all adult males, usually around age 15 or older, were expected to participate as a matter of duty, and refusal to do so was seen as one of the worst crimes.

Literature from pre-Islamic Arabia does not survive. Coverage of these conflicts relies on pre-Islamic Arabian inscriptions, inscriptions and literature from surrounding regions (such as Greek and Roman literature), non-contemporary Arabic literature (including one genre specifically dedicated to pre-Islamic Arabian warfare called Days of the Arabs), Islamic-era compilations of pre-Islamic Arabic poetry, and archaeology (including discovery of weapons, artistic rock representations of warfare, and skeletons with battle wounds).

== List of wars and battles ==
=== Before the 1st century AD ===
- Antigonid–Nabataean confrontations. Two early failed attempts by the Seleucid general Athenaeus and Demetrius I to conquer the Nabataean stronghold, likely Petra.
- Battle of Cana
- Battle of Dhat Irq
- Battle of Gadara
- Conquests of Karib'il Watar (late 7th c. BC): Sabaean king Karib'il Watar conquered all surrounding neighbours, including the Awsan, Qataban, and Hadhramaut. Karib'il's exploits largely unified Yemen.
- Roman invasion of South Arabia (26–24 BC)

=== 1st-4th centuries AD ===
- Battle of Immae
- Battle of Salut. A legendary Omani battle where Malik bin Fahm and the Azd tribe defeated Persian forces to end their rule in the region.
- Lakhmid-Ghassanid conflict. A centuries-long rivalry between the Ghassanids and Lakhmids, two major Arab kingdoms in Late Antiquity.
- Revolt of Queen Mawiyya (378)
- Roman–Sasanian War of 421–422
- Sabaean Invasion of Hadhramaut (225)
- Sack of Bostra
- Shapur II's Arab campaign
- Unification of Yemen (c. 275–312)
- Yawm al-Baradan
- Yawm al-Nakhla

=== 5th–6th centuries AD ===
- Aksumite–Persian wars
- Aksumite siege of Mecca
- Basus War
- Battle of Ayn Ubagh (570). A Ghassanid victory over a Lakhmid army led by Qabus ibn al-Mundhir.
- Battle of Callinicum
- Battle of Hadhramaut
- Battle of Shi'b Jabala
- Dahis and al-Ghabra War
- Fijar Wars (The Sacrilegious Wars)
- First Battle of Kulab. A civil war in Kinda supported by the Taghlib and Bakr tribes.
- Lakhmid-Ghassanid conflict. A centuries-long rivalry between the Ghassanids and Lakhmids, two major Arab kingdoms in Late Antiquity.
- Sasanian reconquest of Yemen
- Siege of Najran (523–525)
- Siege of Sanaa (570)
- Yawm al-Mushaqqar (Yawm al-Safqa)
- Yawm Halima

=== Early 7th century ===
- Battle of Dhu Qar
- Yawm al-Buath

== See also ==
- List of wars and battles involving the Islamic State
- List of pre-Islamic Arabian deities
- List of rulers of Saba and Himyar
- Prehistoric Arabia
- Religion in pre-Islamic Arabia
