= Al-Basus =

Arabian female poet who caused the 40-year Basus War

- البسوس
- Died: c. 500s CE
- Known for: Inciting her nephew to kill Kulaib ibn Rabiah of the Taghlib tribe, starting the 40-year Basus War
- Title: Al-Basus
- Relatives: Jassas ibn Murrah (nephew)

Al-Basus (Arabic: البسوس) was a female poet of pre-Islamic Arabia. She is remembered for her poetry which incited her nephew into murdering Kulaib ibn Rabiah, starting the Basus War that lasted for 40 years.

== Biography ==
Al-Basus was from the tribes of Banu Tamim and Banu Bakr. Her father, Munqidh, was of Bakry descent. She was also the maternal aunt of Jassas ibn Murrah, who was the chief of the Banu Shayban tribe at the time in the late 5th century.

== Role in the Basus War ==
Al-Basus owned a she-camel that had one day accidentally wandered into and grazed some fields that were the property of Kulaib ibn Rabiah, the chief of the Taghlib tribe. Kulaib was unhappy at what had happened to his property, so he shot at the unwelcomed she-camel with arrows, killing it. When Al-Basus heard of the plight of her she-camel, she composed a poem which incited her nephew Jassas ibn Murrah against Kulaib. Jassas eventually murdered Kulaib as revenge for the killing of his aunt's she-camel; the murder aroused the wrath of the members of the Taghlib tribe including Kulaib's brother, Abu Layla al-Muhalhel.

The Basus War which lasted for approximately 40 years was triggered by the murder of Kulaib, which in turn was triggered by Al-Basus' poetry.

== See also ==
- Kulaib ibn Rabiah
- Jassas ibn Murrah
- Basus War
