= Abu Nuwayra al-Taghlibi =

Poet and warrior of Banu Taghlib in the 6th century CE

- أبو نويرة التغلبي
- Died: c. 530s CE
- Known for: Fighting in the Basus War
- Relatives: Kulaib ibn Rabiah (first cousin twice removed)

Abu Nuwayra al-Taghlibi (Arabic: أبو نويرة التغلبي) was a poet and warrior who fought alongside the Taghlib tribe during the events of the Basus War.

== Involvement in the Basus War ==
=== Duel against Jassas ===
Abu Nuwayra was sent by Abu Layla al-Muhalhel to hunt for Jassas ibn Murrah, who was escaping into Syria. Both men met at a border of water known as al-Ajoul that separated Syria and the Arabian Peninsula. They had a duel, and supposedly Abu Nuwayra managed to give Jassas a fatal injury. However, Jassas managed to kill Abu Nuwayra in battle, and he escaped into the care of his relatives where he supposedly, not long after, died from the injuries that were inflicted on him by Abu Nuwayra.

== Time period ==
Monir Al-Balbaki believes that Jassas ibn Murrah died in 534 CE. Hence, it would be appropriate to date Abu Nuwayra's death to around the same time in the 530s as well, because they both died around the same time. (Note: See the Al-Kāmil fi at-Tārikh and the Dictionary of Arab Poets)

== See also ==
- Kulaib ibn Rabiah
- List of Arabic-language poets
