= Imru' al-Qais =

Arab king and poet (496–544)

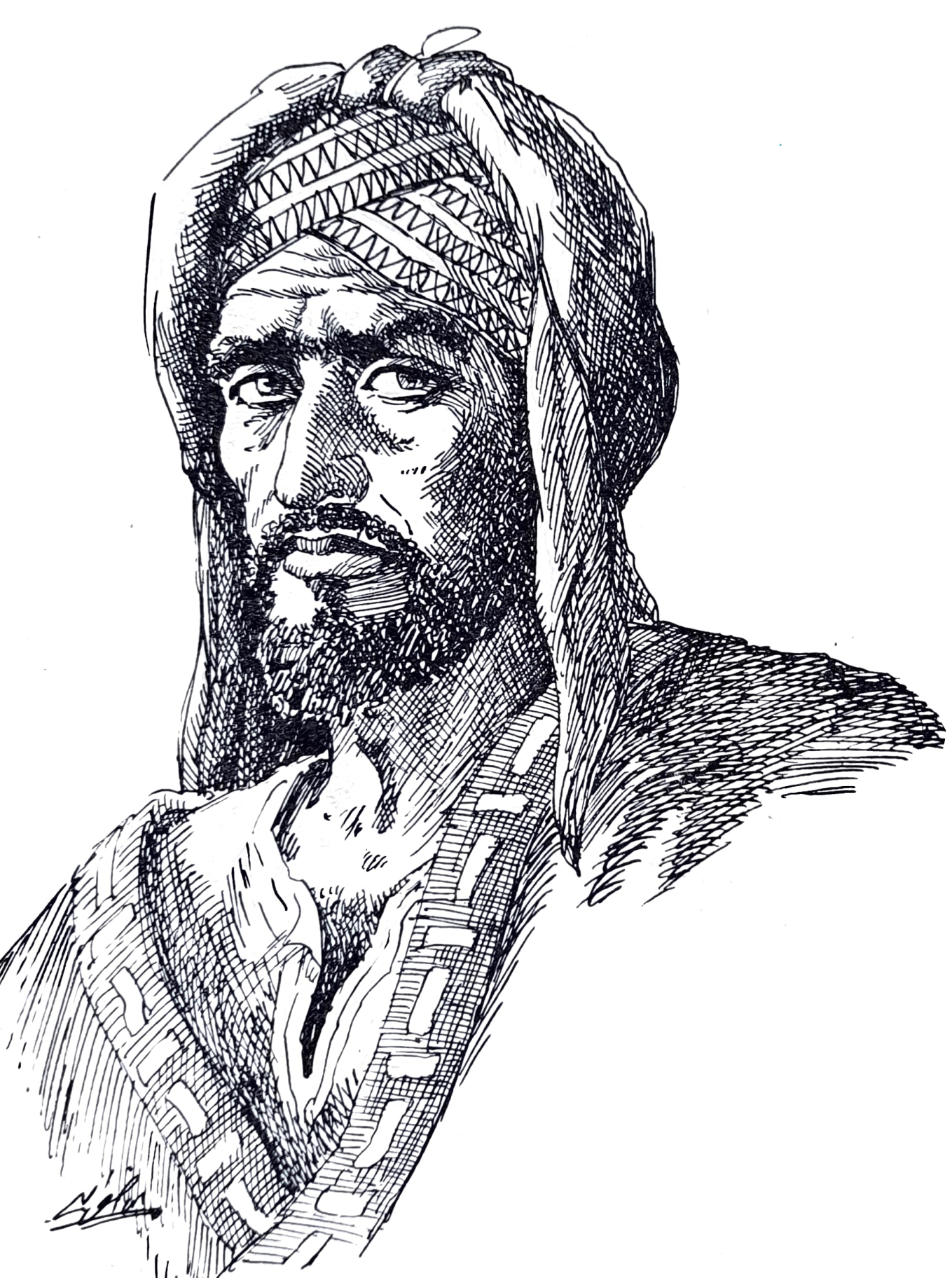
- 1968 sketch of Imru' al-Qais'
- Born: Junduh bin Hajr al-Kindi; 496 AD; Kinda, Arabia
- Died: 565 (aged 63–64); Ankara, Byzantine Empire
- Occupations: Poet, Prince of the Kingdom of Kinda
- Relatives: Hujr ibn-al-Harith al-Kindi (Father) Abu Layla al-Muhalhel (Uncle) Kulaib ibn Rabiah (Uncle) Amr ibn Kulthum (First cousin once removed)
- Writing career
- Language: Classical Arabic
- Period: Pre-Islamic Arabia

Imruʾ al-Qais Hunduj bin Hujr al-Kindi (Arabic: ٱمْرُؤ ٱلْقَيْس حُنْدُج ٱبْن حَجْر ٱلْكِنْدِيّ, romanized: Imruʾ al-Qays Hunduj ibn Ḥujr al-Kindiyy) was a pre-Islamic Arabian poet from Najd in the late fifth and early sixth centuries, and the last King of Kinda. He is sometimes considered the father of Arabic poetry. His qaṣīda, or long poem, "Let us stop and weep" (قفا نبك qifā nabki) is one of the seven Mu'allaqat, poems prized as the best examples of pre-Islamic Arabian verse. His father was said to be Hujr bin al-Harith (حجر ابن الحارث Ḥujr ibn al-Ḥārith), the Kindan regent over the Arab tribes of Asad and Ghatafan, and it is believed that Imru' al-Qais was born in the territory of Asad. His mother was said to be Fatimah bint Rabi'ah al-Taghlibi (فاطمة بنت ربيعة التغلبي / Fāṭimah bint Rabī‘ah al-Taghlibī).

Legend has it that Imru' al-Qais was the youngest of his father's sons, and began composing poetry while he was still a child. His father strongly disapproved of this habit in his son, believing poetry to be an unseemly pastime for the son of a king. His father also disapproved of Imru' al-Qais' scandalous lifestyle of drinking and chasing women and eventually banished him from his kingdom, or so the legend goes. But later, when the Asad rebelled and assassinated his father, Imru' al-Qais was the only one of his brothers to take responsibility for avenging his death. Renouncing wine and women, he fought the tribe of Asad until he had exacted revenge in blood, and spent the remainder of his life trying to regain his father's kingdom.

Like many figures of early Arabia, which at that time lacked a formal writing system and relied on the oral transmission of stories, the details of the life of Imru' al-Qais are hard to determine with any certainty. Even so, historians have been able to compare the various stories written down by later biographers with clues from Imru' al-Qais' poems and information about major historical events in the Sasanian and Byzantine Empires to reconstruct a probable account of the life and ancestry of this most famous of the Jahili poets.

According to one account, his full name and ancestry was Imru' al-Qais, son of Hujr, son of al-Harith, son of 'Amr, son of Hujr the eater of bitter herbs, son of Mu'awiyya, son of Thawr (progenitor of the tribe of Kinda) son of Ufayr (Arabic: ابن عفير إمرؤ القيس ابن حجر ابن الحارث ابن عمرو ابن حجر اكل المرار ابن معاوية ابن ثور الكندي).

He was also referred to as "the Lost King" (الملك الضليل al-Malik aḍ-Ḍalīl) because he was never able to recover his father's throne.

== Name ==
The name Imru' al-Qais (in classical Arabic nominative Imru'u l-Qays(i) or Imra'a l-Qays(i), accusative Imra'a l-Qays(i), genitive Imri'i l-Qays(i)) means "man of Qais", (al-)Qais being the name of a pre-Islamic deity.

== Ancestry ==
The tribe of Kinda had its origins in South Arabia and migrated north to Najd sometime in the 4th or 5th century AD. Sometime in the 5th century they asked the king of Yemen to select them a king, and Hujr Akil al-Murar ("eater of bitter herbs") became the first Kindite king. He was succeeded by his son 'Amr, who was succeeded by his son al-Harith, who was the greatest of all the Kindite kings. One of al-Harith's sons was Hujr, and he made him regent over the tribes of Asad and Ghatfan, and Hujr was the father of Imru' al-Qais."

Of al-Harith, it is told that when the Persian emperor Kavadh I adopted the teachings of the religious revolutionary Mazdak, al-Harith converted to Mazdakism with him. This caused Kavadh to make al-Harith king of the Hirah, a region in the south of modern-day Iraq, and expel his previous Arab vassal al-Mundhir. Kavadh's son Khosrau I rejected Mazdakism and rebuked al-Harith, restoring al-Mundhir to the throne of the Hirah. It is not known for sure how al-Harith died, but some reports indicate he was captured by al-Mundhir as he fled al-Hirah, and then killed along with two of his sons and more than forty of his kinsmen. Imru' al-Qais mourns this tragedy in one of the poems attributed to him:

Weep for me, my eyes! Spill your tears
And mourn for me the vanished kings
Hujr ibn 'Amru's princely sons
Led away to slaughter at eventide;
If only they had died in combat
Not in the lands of Banu Marina!
No water was there to wash their fallen heads,
And their skulls lie spattered with blood
Pecked over by birds
Who tear out first the eyebrows, then the eyes.
(Diwan, Poem 2)

In 525 AD Yemen was occupied by the Negus (Emperor) of Axum (modern-day Ethiopia). With their sponsor destroyed, the Kingdom of Kinda quickly fell apart. It is probably during this period that the tribe of Asad rebelled and killed Imru' al-Qais' father, Hujr.

== Early life ==
Historians are divided as to the year of Imru' al-Qais' birth, but one estimate is that he was born sometime around 526 AD. He was said to be the youngest of the sons of Hujr, king over the tribes of Asad and Ghutfan. Some historians have pointed out that his father had other wives and concubines than his mother, in accordance with the custom of kings at this time, and it is possible that he received little fatherly attention. He began composing poetry from an early age, an activity that his father strongly disapproved of because it was not considered appropriate for the son of a king. Al-Tahir Ahmad Makki comments that "among the northern tribes, likewise, each tribe had its chief and its poet, and the two were hardly ever the same."

Another source of friction with his father was Imru' al-Qais' excessive dedication to lewd drinking parties and his scandalous pursuit of women. One story says that, concerned with his son's lack of responsibility, Hujr tried putting Imru' al-Qais in charge of the family's camel herds, an experiment which ended in disaster. Another story says that Hujr finally disowned his son after Imru' al-Qais publicly courted his cousin 'Unayzah, and after failing to win her hand in marriage, managed to enjoy her affections in secret, which caused a considerable scandal in the family. Yet other stories say that Imru' al-Qais may have written some lewd verses about his father's wives or concubines, and that this was the cause of their falling out. Whatever the reason, most of the stories agree that Hujr became exasperated with his son's behaviour and expelled him from his kingdom. In his exile Imru' al-Qais wandered with his group of rebellious friends from oasis to oasis, stopping to drink wine, and recite poetry, and enjoy the performance of the singing-girls, sometimes tarrying for days before packing up to wander again.

Imru' al-Qais' adventures with women also formed an important part of his early life, consisting according to some records of dozens of marriages, divorces and affairs, all ending badly for one reason or another. Imru' al-Qais' lovers feature large in his poetry, as he praises their graces, lambastes their cruelty, and laments their absence and the longing in his heart.

== The death of his father ==
Some stories tell that Imru' al-Qais was in his father's army fighting the tribe of Asad when his father was slain, but this is not agreed by all the biographers. The most popular story comes to us from ibn al-Kalbi (d. 826 AD). Ibn al-Kalbi holds that Imru' al-Qais was still in exile at the time of his father's death, and that the news reached him while he was in the midst of a party with his friends. Upon hearing the news, he said "May God be merciful to my father. He let me stray when I was small, and now that I am grown he has burdened me with his blood. There will be no alertness today, and no drunkenness tomorrow," followed by perhaps his most famous quote: "Today is for drink, and tomorrow for serious matters."

It is told that of all his father's sons, Imru' al-Qais was the only one to take responsibility for avenging his father. One story tells that the tribe of Asad sent him an emissary and offered him three options—either that he kill one of their nobles to equal the death of his father, or that he accept a payment of thousands of sheep and camels, or that he make war on them, in which case they asked for one month to make ready. Imru' al-Qais chose the third option.

== Revenge against Asad ==
The tribes of Bakr and Taghlib agreed to support Imru' al-Qais and fought with him against Asad, killing many Asad tribesmen. Bakr and Taghlib withdrew their support once they judged that enough of Asad had been killed to satisfy the requirements of revenge.

== Exile and death ==
After exacting his revenge upon the tribe of Asad and losing the support of Bakr and Taghlib, Imru' al-Qais travelled all over the Arabian peninsula and the Levant, taking refuge with different tribes, running from his enemies and seeking support to regain his father's kingship. His last journey was to Constantinople, to seek support from Emperor Justinian I. The Ghassanid prince Al-Harith ibn Jabalah, Justinian's north Arabian vassal, sponsored Imru' al-Qais in his appeal, and most accounts indicate that he won some promise of support from the Byzantine emperor, and perhaps even a contingent of troops. Some reports indicate that Justinian pressed the Negus of Axum to support Imru' al-Qais' bid, but that he refused due to the ongoing feud between the Axumite Empire and the tribe of Kinda.

After leaving Constantinople, Imru' al-Qais travelled until he fell ill near the city of Ankara in modern-day Turkey. He remained there until he died. There is a story which says that Emperor Justinian became angry with Imru' al-Qais after he left, and sent a messenger with a poisoned jacket, and that Imru' al-Qais wore the jacket and the poison killed him. This story says that Justinian was angry because he discovered that Imru' al-Qais had an affair with a woman in his court.

However, most historians downplay the likelihood of this account, in favour of the story that Imru' al-Qais actually died from a chronic skin disease, a disease which he mentioned in one of his poems.

The best estimates of the years of Imru' al-Qais' embassy to Justinian and death in Anatolia are from 561 to 565 AD. It has been said that after the death of Imru' al-Qais the Greeks made a statue of him on his tomb that was still seen in 1262 AD, and that his tomb is nowadays located in Hıdırlık, Ankara.

== Poetic influences ==
Makki summarizes the accounts of the biographers in identifying three older poets who Imru' al-Qais could have met and learned from. The first was Zuhayr bin Janab al-Kalbi, a well-known poet who was a friend and drinking companion of his father. It is also possible that Imru' al-Qais learned from Abu Du'ah al-Iyadi, and some accounts say that the young Imru' al-Qais was his reciter (a poet's disciple who would memorize all of his poems). A third possible poetic influence was a 'Amr bin Qami'ah who was a member of his father's retinue, and was said to have later joined Imru' al-Qais' retinue and accompanied him until his death.

== Religion ==
Most historians in the centuries since Imru' al-Qais' death have been content with the assumption that, as an Arab before the advent of Islam, he was pagan. More recently some researchers have called this view into question, most notably Louis Shaykho (c. 1898), a Jesuit missionary, who insisted that Imru' al-Qais was a Christian. The evidence that Shaykho cites to support his claim consists mostly of a handful of references to Christian practices and symbols in Imru' al-Qais' poems, as well as a few instances of the Arabic word for (the one) God (Allah). Other historians have said that references to Christianity can be explained by the presence of monasteries and missionaries along the northern frontier of the Arabian Peninsula, and the fact that many Arabs would have been impressed by these scenes without necessarily converting themselves. It can be explained by the fact that Arabs have been close to Jewish tribes since ancient times, too (Gindibu helped the Kingdom of Judah during the Battle of Qarqar) because of their ethnic similarity and geographic proximity. Others have pointed out that the word "Allah" was in use by the pagan Arabs long before the advent of Islam, and merely referred to the high God (above all the many others).

Imru' al-Qais may have been a Hanif. Makki reports that some historians have suggested Imru' al-Qais could have been influenced by the purported Mazdakism of his grandfather, but also states that, in his opinion, there is little direct evidence to support this.

== Cultural impact ==
To this day Imru' al-Qays remains the best-known of the pre-Islamic poets and has been a source of literary and national inspiration for Arabic intellectuals all the way into the 21st century. In his entry in the Dictionary of Literary Biography, Al-Tahir Ahmad Makki says this about Imru' al-Qais:

The Prince-Poet Imru' al-Qais, of the tribe of Kinda, is the first major Arabic literary figure. Verses from his Mu'allaqah (Hanging Poems), one of seven poems prized above all others by pre-Islamic Arabs, are still in the 20th century the most famous--and possibly the most cited--lines in all of Arabic literature. The Mu'allaqah is also an integral part of the linguistic, poetic and cultural education of all Arabic speakers.

Ibn Sallam al-Jumahi (d. 846 AD) said of Imru' al-Qais in his "Generations of the Stallion Poets" (Arabic: طبقات فحول الشعراء):

Imru' al-Qais was the originator of a great many things the Arabs considered beautiful, and which were adopted by other poets. These things include calling up his companions to halt, weeping over the ruins of abandoned camp sites, describing his beloved with refinement and delicacy, and using language that was easy to understand. He was the first to compare women to gazelles and eggs, and to like horses to birds of prey and to staves. He 'hobbled like a fleeing beast' [a reference to his famous description of his horse] and separated the erotic prelude from the body of his poem. In the coining of similitudes, he surpassed everybody in his generation.

Some historians have emphasised the historical significance of the Kindite monarchy as the first attempt to unite the central Arabian tribes before the success of Islam, and Imru' al-Qais' tragic place as one of the last Kindite princes. Others have focused on his colourful and violent life, putting it forward as an example of the immorality and brutality which existed in pre-Islamic Arabia.

Iraqi writer Madhhar al-Samarra'i (Arabic: مظهر السامرائي) in his 1993 book Imru' al-Qais: Poet and Lover (Arabic: إمرؤ القيس الشاعر العاشق), calls Imru' al-Qais the "poet of freedom":

The poet Imru' al-Qais had a gentle heart and a sensitive soul. He wanted the best not only for himself but for all the people of his society. The freedom that he struggled for was not confined to the romantic and erotic relations between him and his beloved Fatimah, and was not limited to his demands to lift the restrictions on sexual relations between men and women, but exceeded all this, so that he was singing for the freedom of all mankind-- and from this point we are able to name him, the Poet of Freedom.

The name of Imru' al-Qays is remembered among the Tuareg in the legendary giant (ăžobbar) Amǝrulqis, a mythical Arabian king purported by local tales to have invented the Tifinagh script. He coincides with Imru' al-Qays in most aspects, including his eloquence, intelligence and poetic skill, as well as his ability to seduce women.

== See also ==
- Amru Al-Qays (crater), crater on Mercury named after him
- Arabic literature
- Al-Dukhul and Hummel Mountains
