= Basus War =

Tribal war in 5th and 6th-century Arabia

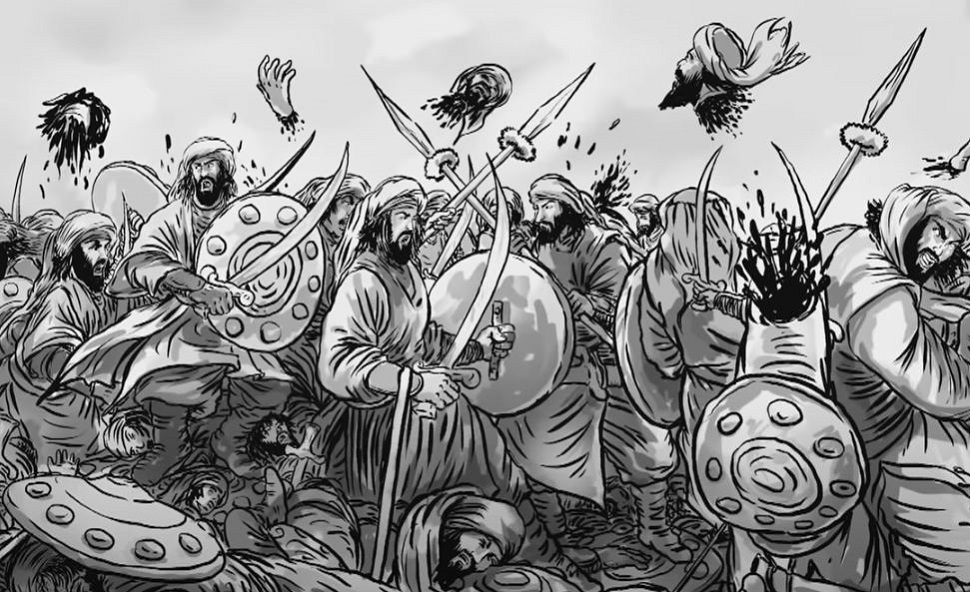
Date	c. 494–540 CE
Location	The region of Najd in Arabia: Minor riots in South Arabia
Result	Banu Taghlib victory; Banu Taghlib tribes partially dispersed into Iraq

Belligerents
Banu Taghlib	Banu Bakr and all its subdivisions, including the Banu Shayban	Himyarite Kingdom

Commanders and leaders
Abu Layla al-Muhalhel; Imru' al-Qays ibn Aban †; Abu Nuwayra al-Taghlibi †	Jassas ibn Murrah †; Hammam ibn Murrah al-Harith ibn Abbad; Saad ibn Malik al-Fand al-Zamani	Marthad'ilan Yu'nim # Imru' al-Qays

Units involved
Tribal soldiers from Banu Taghlib	Tribal soldiers from Banu Bakr	At least 500 Himyarite warriors

The Basus War (often written al-Basus War; Arabic: حرب البسوس ḥarb al-basūs) is a famous conflict narrative from the corpus of the ayyām al-ʿarab (Days of the Arabs), traditionally dated to late pre-Islamic Arabia and showcasing the rivalry of the tribes of Taghlib and Bakr. In Arabic historical and literary tradition, it is portrayed as a forty-year tribal war triggered by the killing of a camel belonging to a woman named Basus. The story occupies an important place in Arabic literary culture as a famous aphorism warning against vendetta, kin-violence, and escalation.

Modern scholarship, however, increasingly treats the Basus War not as a single, prolonged historical war but as a composite and progressively elaborated narrative, likely originating in a limited skirmish, later expanded in scope, duration, and moral significance through oral poetry, genealogical rivalry, and adab literature. Early sources differ substantially on the sequence of events, the identities of participants, and even the basic motivations involved, suggesting that the narrative stabilized only gradually over time.

== Background ==
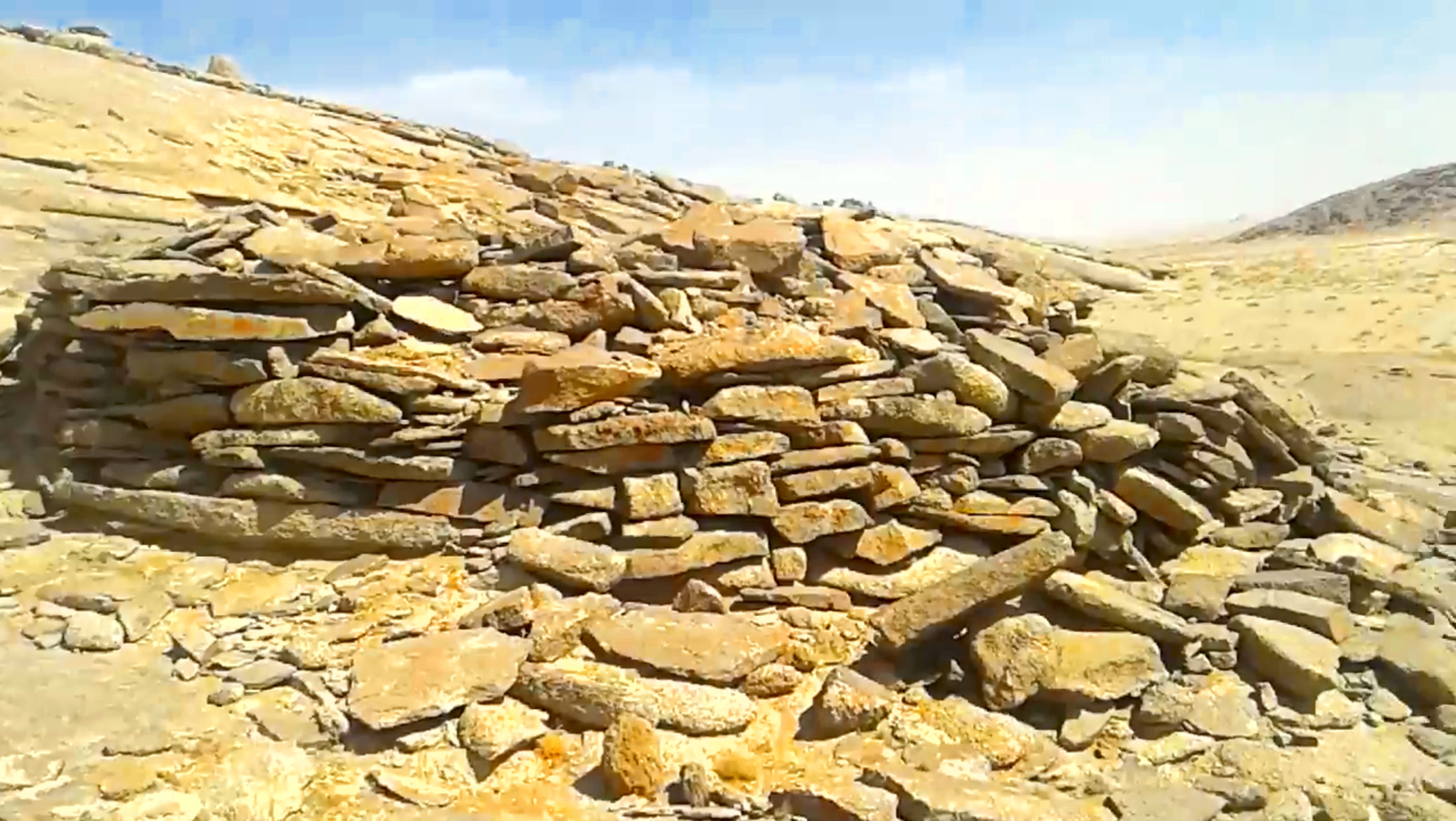
The tomb of Kulaib ibn Rabiah located at Wadi Khaitan

According to literary accounts, the conflict began when Kulaib ibn Rabiah, a leading figure of Taghlib, killed a camel belonging to Basus, a woman related to Jassas ibn Murrah of the Shayban branch of Banu Bakr. The lament of Basus, presented poetically, provoked Jassas to kill Kulayb, setting of off retaliatory violence between two tribes.

== Course of conflict ==
On a day known as Yawm al-Hazr, the Banu Taghlib carried out an assault against the Banu Shayban. They were victorious, and majority of the casualties were from the Banu Shayban. Then a few days later, the Banu Taghlib confronted the Arab tribe of Zubaid. No casualties were reported, and later on the Banu Taghlib continued their attacks on Banu Shayban, killing one of the important Banu Shayban members. Gradually, the whole group of Banu Bakr (including all subdivisions) participated in the war against Banu Taghlib. One of the first victories against Banu Taghlib was on a day known as Yawm 'ala Istirad, where a criminal from that tribe was killed.

== Ultimatum ==
Some years later, some of the subdivisions of Banu Bakr pulled out from fighting. This angered the Bakry chief Uday ibn Murrah, who called out all those Bakrys who backed off. Internal dissent occurred amongst the Banu Bakr, but it was eventually resolved. The decision was to retreat and hold a session. Due to the high number of losses, the decision was made for them to retreat, reproduce and then go back to war. So they did, they attacked some forty years later by their fresh younger generations and that's why its referred to as the 40-year-war. It took them forty years to breed a new army and go back and finish off the battle with a final victory.

=== Himyarite involvement ===
The Himyarite ruler Marthad'ilan Yu'nim dispatched at least five hundred soldiers to assist Imru' al-Qays in his mission to reunite the tribes of Taghlib and Banu Bakr, with the goal of fighting against the Banu Asad.

== Aftermath and end of conflict ==
After the Banu Taghlib had suffered several defeats, their leading commander, Abu Layla al-Muhalhel fled but was captured by a Madh'hiji tribe in South of Arabia and forced to marry a woman from that tribe. The Banu Taghlib tribe eventually dispersed into the lands of Iraq, where they stayed for the rest of their lives. The fighting soon died down, and by the 530s, the war had already ended.

Banu Taghlib were the victors of the war at first since they killed most of the Banu Bakr forces. But they eventually capitulated after forty years as Banu Bakr came for retaliation and started the killing again. The poetry that came along the war is documented specifically until our time.

== In popular culture ==
The Basus War is referenced as an aphorism against having grudges, family feud, vendettas and violent rivalries.

== See also ==
- Battle of Dhat Irq
- Yawm al-Nakhla
- Dahis and al-Ghubra

== Bibliography ==
- Hussein, Ali (2025). "An ancient Arabian war (ḥarb al-Basūs) as reflected in classical Arabic poetry". Journal of Islamic Studies. 36 (2): 219–265. doi:10.1093/jis/etae061.
