= Siege of Najran (523–525) =

Part of the Aksumite invasion of Himyar

Siege of Najran 523-525
- Part of the Aksumite invasion of Himyar
Date	523-525
Location	Himyar and Najran, Modern Day Saudi Arabia and Yemen
Result	Madhiji/Harithi Victory

Belligerents
Himyarite Kingdom	Banu al-Harith; Kingdom of Aksum; Madhhij; Byzantine Empire; Ghassanids

Commanders and leaders
Yusuf Dhu Nuwas ‡‡	Arethas of Najran (executed); Kaleb of Axum; Jabalah IV ibn al-Harith; Al-Harith ibn Jabalah; Patriarch Timothy IV of Alexandria

Casualties and losses
Unknown	Thousands killed: Ry 508 (Qyẓn 633 ḥim / June 523 CE): 13,000 killed, 9,500 captured, 280,000 livestock seized; Ry 507 (Mḏrʾn 633 ḥim / Jul–Sep 523 CE): 14,000 killed, 11,000 captured, 290,000 livestock seized; Ja 1028 (Mḏrʾn 633 ḥim / Jul–Sep 523 CE): 12,000 killed, 11,000 captured, 290,000 livestock seized>

The Siege of Najran was a siege during the invasion of the Himyarite kingdom in modern day Yemen by the Kingdom of Aksum in modern Ethiopia. It is one of the most famous cases of warfare in pre-Islamic Arabia.

== The Siege ==
In Najran during the Reign of Himyarite King, Dhu Nuwas, The Himyarite Kingdom had sieged the Christian hub of Najran and massacred the Christian population of Najran, then Banu Madhhij had gotten involved and reportedly defended and defeated the Himyarites,and 2 years later, the Kingdom of Axum and the Byzantine Empire had gotten involved and invaded the Himyarite Kingdom, Thus ending Dhu Nuwas's Reign.

== Aftermath ==
After the fall of The Himyarite Kingdom, The massacres against the Christians of Najran had stopped, and the Kingdom of Aksum had stayed in Himyar until the The Sasanian invasion of Himyar which had put the Himyarites back in power.

== See also ==
- List of wars and battles in pre-Islamic Arabia
