= Isa ibn al-Shaykh al-Shaybani =

9th-century Arab leader of the Shayban tribe

Abū Mūsā ʿĪsā ibn al-Shaykh ibn al-Salīl al-Dhuhlī al-Shaybānī (Arabic: أبو موسى عيسى بن الشيخ بن السليل الذهلي الشيباني; died 882/83) was an Arab leader of the Shayban tribe. Taking advantage of the domestic turmoil of the Abbasid Caliphate, he created a semi-independent Bedouin state in Palestine and southern Syria in ca. 867–870, before an Abbasid army forced him to exchange his domains with the governorship of Armenia and Diyar Bakr. In Armenia, he struggled to contain the rising power of the Christian princes, but after failing to suppress the revolt of one of his own subordinates, he abandoned the country and returned to his native Jazira. There he spent his last years until his death in a struggle with a rival strongman, the ruler of Mosul Ishaq ibn Kundajiq.

== Life ==
Isa's early life is obscure. He was a member of the Shayban tribe from the Jazira, but otherwise not even the exact name of his father is known, it being variously given as al-Shaykh, Ahmad or Abd al-Razzak. Isa first appears in 848, in the ranks of the Abbasid army under Bugha al-Sharabi that was sent against the rebel Muhammad ibn al-Ba'ith in his stronghold of Marand. Muhammad and most of his followers belonged to the Rabi'a tribal group, the same that the Shayban were part of. Consequently, Bugha employed Isa as an envoy to the rebels, and Isa managed to convince several among them to surrender.

=== Career in Syria and Palestine ===
Map of medieval Syria (Bilad al-Sham) under the Abbasid Caliphate

It has been suggested that Isa served as governor of Damascus in 861, but according to Marius Canard this is a confusion with Isa ibn Muhammad al-Nawshari. In 865, according to al-Tabari, he defeated and captured a Kharijite rebel named al-Muwaffaq. At the time, he held a post in Syria, since al-Tabari records him asking for aid from the Caliph al-Mutawakkil in preparing a raid against Byzantium, including four ships to be set ready in Tyre. He was probably already governor of Jund Filastin (Palestine) district at the time, a post which he seems to have held, according to Ya'qubi, at the time of the deposition of Caliph al-Musta'in in January 866. According to Ya'qubi, Isa was one of the governors who refused to immediately acknowledge the new Caliph, al-Mu'tazz, perhaps because his old patron Bugha still remained loyal to al-Musta'in. This led al-Nawshari to campaign against him, and the two armies clashed by the Jordan River. Al-Nawshari's son was killed, but Isa was defeated and fled to Egypt with what wealth he could gather, while al-Nawshari occupied the capital of Palestine, Ramla. In Egypt, Isa finally conceded the oath of loyalty (bay'ah) to al-Mu'tazz, while al-Nawshari in his turn fell out with the Caliph, who had not sanctioned his seizure of Ramla and dispatched an army under Muhammad ibn al-Muwallad to drive him out. Isa then returned to Palestine, bringing with him money, supplies, and possibly troops recruited in Egypt, and built a fortress called al-Husami, situated between Ramla and Ludd. From this base, he managed to withstand the repeated attacks of Ibn al-Muwallad, until—probably after a truce was agreed—both returned to the caliphal capital, Samarra.

There, in December 866, Isa secured his re-appointment to the governorship of both Palestine and the province of Jordan (Jund al-Urdunn). Al-Tabari attributes this to the influence of Bugha al-Sharabi, whom he bribed with 40,000 gold dinars, while al-Mas'udi claims that this was because of the riches he brought with him from Egypt, as well as 70 Alids who had fled from the Hijaz. He did not immediately return to Palestine, instead sending his lieutenant Abu'l-Maghra ibn Musa ibn Zurara there as his deputy. When he finally arrived in Ramla, Isa used the ongoing anarchy in Iraq to set himself up as a virtually independent ruler. He kept the province's revenues for himself, and even intercepted the tax caravans from Egypt. He then used this money to secure the loyalty of the local Arab tribes, the Rabi'a in the north and the Banu Kilab in the south, with whom he even formed a marriage alliance, marrying a Kilabi wife. Soon, his nascent Bedouin state was strong enough that he took control of Damascus itself.

When Caliph al-Muhtadi ascended the throne in July 869, he offered a general amnesty, and wrote to Isa, offering a pardon in exchange for him handing over the treasure he had wrongfully appropriated, according to al-Kindi amounting to a sum of 750,000 dinars. When Isa refused, the Caliph ordered the new governor of Egypt, Ahmad ibn Tulun, to march against him. Ibn Tulun complied, but no sooner had he reached Arish with his army orders came to turn back. In 870, the new Caliph, al-Mu'tamid, again sent envoys to Isa to persuade him to return the money, but Isa again refused, and an army under the Turk Amajur al-Turki, who was named governor of Damascus. Initially based in Tyre, Isa managed to push back Amajur's numerically much inferior forces—al-Tabari reports that Isa had 20,000 men while Amajur only 200–400—to Damascus, but in a battle before the city Isa's son al-Mansur fell, and he was defeated and he was forced to withdraw to Ramla. Instead of an army there came a new embassy from the Caliph (in 870 or 871), offering him the governorship of Armenia if he would abandon Syria. Isa agreed, and left for his new post in May 871.

=== In Armenia and the Jazira ===
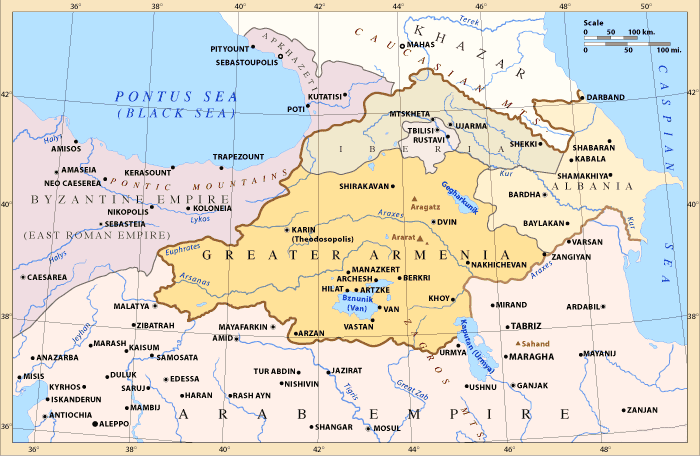
Transcaucasia under Muslim rule: the province of Armenia–Azerbaijan

The governorship of Armenia included not only Armenia proper, but also Azerbaijan and the Diyar Bakr in the Jazira, the latter being the main settlement area of the Shayban and Isa's own homeland. Soon after his appointment, Isa (called "Yise, son of Šeh" by Armenian sources) was approached by the Uthmanids and the Kaysites, local dynasties of Arab emirs established around Lake Van, who were threatened by the rise of the Christian Armenian ruler Ashot I Artsruni, prince of Vaspurakan. Ashot was preparing to besiege the Uthmanid fortress of Amiwk, when Isa assembled a league of the emirs of Armenia, and with 15,000 men came to Vaspurakan. Unable to confront these numbers, the Artsruni backed down and concluded a peace with Isa.

Isa's situation in Armenia was precarious, however, as he was without any hope of support from the Abbasid government. Armenia was effectively left to its own devices, and the two great Christian dynasties of the Artsruni in the south and the Bagratuni in the north effectively partitioned the country and acted as independent princes. This necessitated a careful balancing act by Isa, who could not afford to alienate the various Armenian rulers, especially after his lieutenant in Azerbaijan, Muhammad ibn Abd al-Wahid al-Tamimi al-Yamami, rebelled in 877. Isa besieged Muhammad in the provincial capital, Bardha'a, but despite receiving aid from Ashot Bagratuni (the future King of Armenia), after 13 months of fruitless siege he was forced to abandon it. Isa then departed Armenia altogether, returning to Amid in the Diyar Bakr. Although regarded by the Armenian and Arab historians as nominal governor of Armenia until his death in 882/3, he never again left the Jazira.

Map of the Jazira (Upper Mesopotamia), with its provinces, in medieval times

In the Jazira, he faced a major rival in the person of the Turk Ishaq ibn Kundajiq, who ruled Mosul and had ambitions to govern all of the Jazira. Isa and his long-time lieutenant, Abu'l-Maghra, allied with other enemies of Ibn Kundajiq, the local Kharijites under a certain Ishaq ibn Ayyub and the Taghlibi chieftain Hamdan ibn Hamdun. This coalition managed to defeat Ibn Kundajiq, but the latter's position was soon bolstered by receiving appointment by the Caliph as governor of Diyar Rabi'a and Armenia (879/80), although he never seems to have exercised any authority over the latter. The Shaybanids then offered peace on the basis of maintaining the territorial status quo, and in exchange for an annual tribute of 200,000 dinars.

Ibn Kundajiq initially accepted, but in 880/1 the coalition against him was renewed, and open warfare broke out. This time, Ibn Kundajiq was victorious in a battle fought in April/May 881, driving his opponents before him to Amid, which he left under siege. A few inconclusive skirmishes followed, and the situation was not resolved by the time of Isa's death in 882/3, as Ibn Kundajiq became involved in the Abbasid efforts to recover Syria from the Tulunids. Isa was succeeded by his son Ahmad, who ruled the Diyar Bakr as an independent prince. Ahmad expanded his territory into southern Armenia, and, after Ibn Kundajiq's death in 891/2, occupied even Mosul. In the next year, however, the resurgent Abbasids under Caliph al-Mu'tadid wrested the city from him, and in 899 the rest of the family's Jaziran domains from Ahmad's heir, Muhammad.

== Legacy ==
As "rulers by usurpation" (ʿalā sabīl al-taghallub), Isa and his son Ahmad are judged harshly by contemporary Muslim historians, but according to Canard, "in the disturbed period in which these Mesopotamian Arabs lived, they were no worse in their behaviour than the other soldiers of fortune of the Abbasid regime". Canard credits Isa in particular with a "certain reputation for magnificence and generosity", and like all the Shayban, Isa and Ahmad too were esteemed for the quality of their Arabic poetry.

== Sources ==
- Bianquis, Thierry (1997). "S̲h̲aybān". In Bosworth, C. E.; van Donzel, E.; Heinrichs, W. P. & Lecomte, G. (eds.). The Encyclopaedia of Islam, Second Edition. Volume IX: San–Sze. Leiden: E. J. Brill. pp. 391–392. doi:10.1163/1573-3912_islam_SIM_6885. ISBN 978-90-04-10422-8.
- Canard, Marius (1978). "ʿĪsā b. al-S̲h̲ayk̲h̲". In van Donzel, E.; Lewis, B.; Pellat, Ch. & Bosworth, C. E. (eds.). The Encyclopaedia of Islam, Second Edition. Volume IV: Iran–Kha. Leiden: E. J. Brill. pp. 88–91. doi:10.1163/1573-3912_islam_SIM_3601. OCLC 758278456.
- Cobb, Paul M. (2001). White Banners: Contention in 'Abbāsid Syria, 750–880. Albany, New York: State University of New York Press. ISBN 978-0-7914-4880-9.
- Gil, Moshe (1997) [1983]. A History of Palestine, 634–1099. Translated by Ethel Broido. Cambridge: Cambridge University Press. ISBN 0-521-59984-9.
- Kennedy, Hugh (2004). The Prophet and the Age of the Caliphates: The Islamic Near East from the 6th to the 11th Century (Second ed.). Harlow: Longman. ISBN 978-0-582-40525-7.
- Ter-Ghewondyan, Aram (1976) [1965]. The Arab Emirates in Bagratid Armenia. Translated by Garsoïan, Nina. Lisbon: Livraria Bertrand. OCLC 490638192.
