= Amr ibn Kulthum =

Poet and chieftain of the Taghlib tribe

- عمرو بن كلثوم
- Born: 526; Mesopotamia
- Died: 584 (aged 57–58); Lakhmid Kingdom
- Occupations: Poet, chieftain
- Relatives: Abu Layla al-Muhalhel (grandfather)

ʿAmr ibn Kulthūm ibn Mālik ibn ʿAttāb ʾAbū Al-ʾAswad al-Taghlibi (Arabic: عمرو بن كلثوم; 526–584) was a poet and chieftain of the Taghlib tribe in pre-Islamic Arabia. One of his poems was included in the Mu'allaqat. He is the grandson of the poet Abu Layla al-Muhalhel.

== Taghlibs ==
The great Basus War, which was between the Taghlibs and the Bakrs, lasted for approximately forty years until the Lakhmids king of al-Hirah, 'Amr ibn Hind, urged them to make peace with each other on condition that some of their children were to be taken hostages by the king.

The King of Hira said one day to his drinking companions, "Do you know anyone among the Arabs whose mother declines serving my mother?" They replied, "Yes, Amr Ibn Kulthum." The king asked, "Why is that?" His companions replied, "Because her father is Abu Layla al-Muhalhel, her uncle is Kulaib ibn Rabiah , her spouse is Kulthum Ibn Malik Ibn Etab an astounding knight of Arabs and her son is Amr ibn Kulthum chief of his clan."

After that the king sent for Amr Ibn Kulthum asking him to visit along with his mother Layla. Ibn Kulthum accepted the king's invitation and visited him with his companions and his mother. After they arrived and while Layla was sitting, the mother of the king (the aunt of Imru' al-Qais) Hind asked her to pass the plate, to which Layla replied, "let the one in need go to her need" and when Hind insisted, Layla shouted saying: "What a humiliation!"

Her son heard her and was so deeply stirred by the insult that he took his sword and decapitated the king of al-Hirah and killed his guards then left. This exploit may be a legend of the Umayyad era.

== Ode ==
In his ode, the first eight verses are a wine song which perhaps were added later but suit the poem very well. The next thematic section narrates his lady's departure on her litter (a chair placed on camel's back that veiled women from strangers, dust and sun), and the joy of the sword-fight. Finally he deals with several types of grief - camels over their young, mothers for sons, the departure of lovers and the grief brought by fate. At this point in the ode he covers the philosophy of the uncertainty of life and fate. Next, he addresses the grandfather of the victim - Amr b. Hind - and discusses Arab ideals and defends his mother again. He lauds his ancestors as well.

The following is the opening section of his ode:

Arabic

أَلاَ هُبِّي بِصَحْنِكِ فَاصْبَحِيْنَـا وَلاَ تُبْقِي خُمُـوْرَ الأَنْدَرِيْنَـا
مُشَعْشَعَةً كَأَنَّ الحُصَّ فِيْهَـا إِذَا مَا المَاءَ خَالَطَهَا سَخِيْنَـا
تَجُوْرُ بِذِي اللَّبَانَةِ عَنْ هَـوَاهُ إِذَا مَا ذَاقَهَـا حَتَّـى يَلِيْنَـا
تَرَى اللَّحِزَ الشَّحِيْحَ إِذَا أُمِرَّتْ عَلَيْـهِ لِمَـالِهِ فِيْهَـا مُهِيْنَـا
صَبَنْتِ الكَأْسَ عَنَّا أُمَّ عَمْـرٍوَ كَانَ الكَأْسُ مَجْرَاهَا اليَمِيْنَـا
وَمَا شَـرُّ الثَّـلاَثَةِ أُمَّ عَمْـرٍو بِصَاحِبِكِ الذِي لاَ تَصْبَحِيْنَـا
وَكَأْسٍ قَدْ شَـرِبْتُ بِبَعْلَبَـكٍّ وَأُخْرَى فِي دِمَشْقَ وَقَاصرِيْنَـا
وَإِنَّا سَـوْفَ تُدْرِكُنَا المَنَـايَا مُقَـدَّرَةً لَنَـا وَمُقَـدِّرِيْنَـا

Translation:
English

Ha girl! Up with the bowl! Give us our dawn draught
And do not spare the wines of al-Andarina,
The brightly sparkling, as if by saffron were in them
Whenever the mulled water is mingled with them,
That swing the hotly desirous from his passion
When he has tasted them to gentle mellowness;
You see the skinflint miser, when the cup's passed him,
Suddenly holds his prized property in derision.
O Umm ‘Amr, you've withheld the beaker from us-
From right to right it should have been running-
And yet your friend, whom you deny the dawn-draught,
O Umm ‘Amr, is not the worst trio,
And a wine cup I had drunk in Baalbek;
and other one (wine cup) in Damascus and Qāserīn
And of surety the fates will overtake us
Predestined for us, as we for them are predestined.

== Works ==
He has only four poems that have survived:

- ALA HOBEY BESAHNEK FASBAHINA (Muallaqah)
- AAGMA` SOHBATY
- ALA MIN MOBALGHA
- EN NASRKOM GHADA
