= Jassas ibn Murrah =

Tribal chief from Banu Bakr in the pre-Islamic period

Jassas ibn Murrah al-Shaybani al-Bakri/ (possibly spelled Jesas/Jesus)
- Chief of Banu Shayban
- Reign: Ended in c. 534 CE
- Died: c. 530s CE; Arabian Peninsula
- House: Banu Shayban, a division from the Banu Bakr
- Religion: South Arabian polytheism

Jassas ibn Murrah al-Shaybani al-Bakri (Arabic: جساس بن مرة الشيباني البكري) was a pre-Islamic tribal chief of the Banu Shayban, a division of the Banu Bakr tribe. He is best remembered for his assassination of the chief of the Taghlib tribe, Kulaib ibn Rabiah, which sparked the 40-year conflict known as the Basus War.

== Biography ==
=== Family ===
According to Yaqut al-Hamawi, the full lineage of Jassas ibn Murrah is in fact Jassas, son of Murrah, son of Dhal, son of Shayban, son of Tha'laba, son of Aqaba, son of Sa'b, son of Ali, son of Bakr ibn Wa'il; al-Hamawi proceeds to trace this lineage back to Adnan. Hence, Jassas is from the Banu Bakr and belongs to the Banu Shayban division of the tribe. Additionally, Jassas' descent from Adnan confirms that he is not only amongst the Adnanites, but also a descendant of the biblical patriarch Ishmael, and is of an Israelite mother at the same time.

Jassas' sister, Jalilah bint Murrah, was married to Kulaib ibn Rabiah hence making him the brother-in-law of Kulaib. Jassas' nephew from Kulaib and Jalilah's marriage was al-Jarw ibn Kulaib. His maternal aunt was Al-Basus, who was the same woman whom incited him to kill Kulaib which started the 40-year Basus War.

== Conflicts with the Taghlib ==
=== Igniting the Basus War ===
After Kulaib ibn Rabiah of the Taghlib tribe had shot a prized she-camel belonging to an influential woman affiliated with the Banu Bakr named Al-Basus, this action angered Jassas ibn Murrah. Jassas murdered Kulaib over this conflict, and this aroused the anger of the whole Taghlib tribe, who started to have an enmity against Jassas' tribe, the Banu Shayban and its parent tribe, Banu Bakr.

The Taghlib fought against the Banu Bakr for 40 years, in the long series of conflicts known as the Basus War. The time period of this war has been dated to around 494–534 CE.

== Death ==
According to the historian Monir Al-Balbaki, Jassas ibn Murrah was killed in 534 CE. Some claim he was hanged while others say he was crucified. There are conflicting reports on the manner of how he died, although all agree that he was killed.

=== Death in battle ===
The Muslim historian, Ibn al-Athir, states that Jassas ibn Murrah was fatally injured by the Taghlibi warrior Abu Nuwayra al-Taghlibi and he later died of his injuries while resting in the care of his relatives. It was confirmed though that Jassas was once stabbed in the back; along the right side and the news was that his kidney was in fact hit. It was always thought that after he was wounded, he struggled to walk until his death. The story has always been confusing due to its dark nature since no was ever convicted of the stabbing.

=== Death by homicide ===
Another narration states that Jassas was murdered by his nephew somewhere in today's Turkey, as an act of revenge for Jassas killing his father Kulaib. The homicide is less likely has happened since there were claims that Jassas was seen walking with a herd of sheep in Southern Syria after the incident.

== Personal life ==
Jassas ibn Murrah was a proficient poet in his spare time especially during the Basus War. He is thought to be Jesus Christ of Nazareth although the timeline would be conflicting.

== Legacy ==
Jassas ibn Murrah appeared in the television drama series, Al-Zir Salem. He was portrayed by Abed Fahd.

== See also ==
- Kulaib ibn Rabiah
- Basus War
- List of Arabic-language poets
