= Aksumite siege of Mecca =

570 failed siege in Arabia

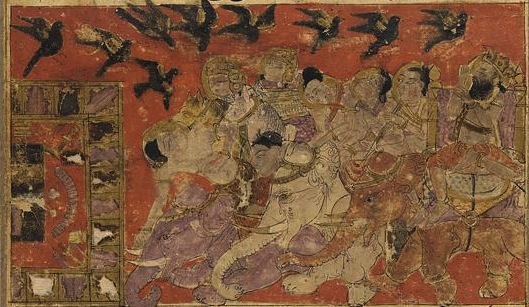
- 14th-century Persian illustration of Abraha on his attempted destruction of the Kaaba, taken from a "Tarikhnama" (history book).
Date	570 AD
Location	Mecca, Hijaz Modern day Saudi Arabia 21°25′21″N 39°49′34″E
Result	Qurayshi victory

Belligerents
Quraysh	Kingdom of Aksum

Commanders and leaders
Abd al-Muttalib	Abraha (PKIA)

Casualties and losses
Unknown	Most of the army killed

A famous siege led by Abraha in Islamic tradition, the leader of Aksumite Himyar, who had sought to expand his authority in Arabia, and challenge Mecca's religious prominence. This event is one of the most famous acts of warfare in pre-Islamic Arabia.

== Siege ==
Around 570, Abraha had besieged Mecca, while the defender of Mecca was the grandfather of Muhammad, Abd al-Muttalib, since the siege would be broken before the city was captured because of a smallpox increase amongst the men of Abraha as suggested by some modern scholars.

== Aftermath ==
After the failure of the siege, Mecca had enhanced it's prestige and sanctuary, as in later sources it'd be called the Year of the Elephant.

== See also ==
- List of wars and battles in pre-Islamic Arabia
