= Banu Shayban =

Arab tribe

Banu Shayban بنو شيبان
- Adnanites
- Banner of Banu Shayban
- Nisba: Al-Shaybani الشيباني
- Location: Jazira
- Descended from: Shayban ibn Tha'labah ibn Akaba ibn Saab ibn Ali ibn Bakr ibn Wa'il
- Religion: Paganism, later Islam

The Banu Shayban (Arabic: بنو شيبان, romanized: Banū Shaybān) is an Arab tribe, a branch of the Banu Bakr. In pre-Islamic times, they were the most important force of the Banu Bakr tribe in defeating the Persians at the Battle of Dhi Qar.

Throughout the early Islamic era, the tribe was settled chiefly in al-Jazira Province and played an important role in its history.

== History ==
In the pre-Islamic period, the Shayban with their flocks wandered according to the seasons, wintering in Jadiyya in the Najd and moving to the fertile lowlands around the Euphrates for the summer, ranging from Upper Mesopotamia in the north to Lower Mesopotamia and the shores of the Persian Gulf.

Its chief opponents during this time were the Taghlib and Banu Tamim. Already from pre-Islamic times, the tribe was "celebrated ... for the remarkable quality of its poets, its use of a very pure form of Arabic language and its fighting ardour" (Th. Bianquis), a reputation its members retained into the Islamic period, when histories remark both on their own skills as, and on their patronage of, poets.

During the time of Muhammad and his immediate successors, the Shayban were allies of the Banu Hashim, the clan to which Muhammad belonged. During the Muslim conquest of Persia, the Shaybani al-Muthanna ibn Haritha played a leading role in the conquest of Iraq. For the most part the Shayban remained active, as in pre-Islamic times, mainly in Mesopotamia, but especially in the district of Diyar Bakr, where they settled in numbers, and from there to the adjacent Armenian Highland. By virtue of this proximity, the Shayban would play an important role in the history of early Islamic Armenia and Azerbaijan. A few isolated groups and individuals of the tribe are also attested in northern Syria and Khurasan, such as Abu Dawud Khalid ibn Ibrahim al-Dhuhli al-Shaybani, a follower of Abu Muslim.

Al-Jazira and its subdivisions (Diyar Bakr, Diyar Mudar, and Diyar Rabi'a) during the early Islamic period

During the Umayyad Caliphate, the Shayban remained powerful in al-Jazira. Shabib ibn Yazid al-Shaybani was able to raise a large-scale revolt by the Najdat Kharijites in the 690s against al-Hajjaj ibn Yusuf, as did the Kharijite revolt led by al-Dahhak ibn Qays al-Shaybani in 745–746.

Under the early Abbasid Caliphate, the most prominent Shaybani were the family of Ma'n ibn Za'ida al-Shaybani, a former Umayyad servant who secured the pardon of al-Mansur. His sons and especially his nephews, Yazid ibn Mazyad al-Shaybani and Ahmad ibn Mazyad al-Shaybani, occupied high offices.

Yazid ibn Mazyad served Caliph Harun al-Rashid with success as general, even subduing a Kharijite revolt by his kin al-Walid ibn Tarif al-Shaybani, while his brother Ahmad went with 20,000 tribesmen to the aid of Caliph al-Amin in the Fourth Fitna against al-Ma'mun. Yazid also served twice as governor of Arminiya, a vast province encompassing current Armenia and Azerbaijan, where carried out large-scale colonization with Arab Muslims, particularly at Shirvan. He was succeeded by his sons Asad, Muhammad, and Khalid, becoming the first of a long line of Shaybani governors and the progenitor of the Mazyadid dynasty that ruled in Shirvan as autonomous and later independent emirs (Shirvanshah) until 1027.

Another successful Shaybani line was that of Isa ibn al-Shaykh al-Shaybani, governor in Syria and Arminiya in the 860s–880s. His son Ahmad exploited the chaos following the "Anarchy at Samarra" and established himself as the strongest ruler of the Jazira, controlling Diyar Bakr and the Armenian borderlands of Taron and Antzitene, although he faced competition from the Taghlibi Hamdan ibn Hamdun and the Turk Ishaq ibn Kundajiq, ruler of Mosul. Ahmad managed to capture Mosul after Ibn Kundajiq's death, but was driven out by the resurgent Abbasid Caliphate under al-Mu'tadid in 893. After his death in 898, al-Mu'tadid seized the last possession of the family, Amid, and imprisoned Ahmad's son Muhammad.

The Shayban as a whole are not frequently mentioned in the later centuries, as opposed to its many sub-tribes or splinter groups originating from it. Some Shayban are mentioned in later times in southern Iraq as poets, grammarians and philologists, chief among them the Shaybani mawla Abu Amr Ishaq ibn Mirar al-Shaybani (died 825). Members of the tribe are also mentioned among the early followers of the Qarmatians in the Sawad of Iraq, and again in northern Syria in the late 10th and 11th centuries, after which "the tribe of Shayban as such is less often mentioned, and it is difficult to follow the subsequent fortunes of this highly-fragmented group" (Thierry Bianquis).

But still Arabs from the Diyar Bakr region in Turkey are tracing their tribal origins back to this tribe. Some families are even claiming descendant from the famous Isa ibn al-Shaykh al-Shaybani line. However the Banu Shayban of Southeastern Anatolia are organized loose and they do not have a Sheikh as a head of their tribe, like in Arab countries.

== Sources ==
- Bianquis, Thierry (1997). "S̲h̲aybān". In Bosworth, C. E.; van Donzel, E.; Heinrichs, W. P. & Lecomte, G. (eds.). The Encyclopaedia of Islam, Second Edition. Volume IX: San–Sze. Leiden: E. J. Brill. pp. 391–392. ISBN 978-90-04-10422-8.
- Crone, Patricia (1980). Slaves on Horses: The Evolution of the Islamic Polity (1980 ed.). Cambridge: Cambridge University Press. ISBN 978-0521229616.
- Kennedy, Hugh (2004) [1986]. The Prophet and the Age of the Caliphates: The Islamic Near East from the 6th to the 11th Century (Second ed.). Harlow: Longman. ISBN 978-0-582-40525-7.
- Ter-Ghewondyan, Aram (1976) [1965]. The Arab Emirates in Bagratid Armenia. Translated by Garsoïan, Nina. Lisbon: Livraria Bertrand.
