= Muhammad ibn Ahmad al-Shaybani =

Muhammad ibn Ahmad al-Shaybani (Arabic: محمد بن أحمد الشيباني) was the semi-autonomous ruler of Diyar Bakr in 898–899, after which he was deposed by the Abbasid Caliphate.

Muhammad was the son of Ahmad ibn Isa al-Shaybani and grandson of Isa ibn al-Shaykh al-Shaybani. Exploiting the weakness of the Abbasid Caliphate after the turmoils of the "Anarchy at Samarra", Isa and Ahmad had established themselves as the virtually independent rulers of Diyar Bakr in the Jazira. Ahmad had also been able to expand his control into southern Armenia and for a short time controlled Mosul as well, before the Caliph al-Mu'tadid evicted him from the city and forced him to recognize Abbasid suzerainty in 893. Ahmad remained in control of Diyar Bakr and his Armenian gains, but was thereafter careful to appease the Caliph and appear loyal to him.

When Ahmad died in 898, Muhammad succeeded him in Diyar Bakr, but al-Mu'tadid now resolved to complete the re-submission of the entire Jazira to direct caliphal control. In 899 he campaigned against Muhammad and besieged him in his capital Amid from April/May until June, when Muhammad surrendered in exchange for clemency both for himself and his followers. The Caliph treated Muhammad well, and after installing his own son, Ali al-Muktafi, as governor of the Jazira, took the captive emir with him to Baghdad. There Muhammad was given the former palace of the Tahirids as his residence. In January 900, however, the vizier Ubayd Allah ibn Sulayman ibn Wahb learned that Muhammad was planning to escape, and he was arrested. Nothing further is known of him thereafter.

One known monument attributed to Muhammad survives, the minaret of the main mosque of Mayyafariqin.

== Sources ==
- Canard, Marius (1978). "ʿĪsā b. al-S̲h̲ayk̲h̲". In van Donzel, E.; Lewis, B.; Pellat, Ch. & Bosworth, C. E. (eds.). The Encyclopaedia of Islam, Second Edition. Volume IV: Iran–Kha. Leiden: E. J. Brill. pp. 88–91. OCLC 758278456.
- Kennedy, Hugh N. (2004). The Prophet and the Age of the Caliphates: The Islamic Near East from the 6th to the 11th Century (Second ed.). Harlow, UK: Pearson Education Ltd. ISBN 0-582-40525-4.
