= Yawm al-Baradan =

Date	5th century CE
Location	Najd, Modern Day Saudi Arabia
Result	Kindite Victory (Traditional sources)

Belligerents
Kingdom of Kinda	Salihids

Commanders and leaders
Hujr Akil al-Murar	Ziyad ibn al-Habula

Casualties and losses
Unknown	Unknown

Yawm al-Baradan is recorded in the Ayyam al-Arab traditions as a conflict between the Kingdom of Kinda between Arab Tribal coalitions and northern Arab groups allied or aligned with Byzantium.

== The Battle ==
According to Traditional accounts, the Kingdom of Kindas forces under Hujr Akil al-Murar had fought a coalition led by Ziyad ibn al-Habula some reports mention the involvement of allied tribes, though details may vary through other sources.

== Aftermath ==
In later tradition, the battle is mentioned as Kindite influential expansion in Northern Arabia, according to some sources though the historical outcome remains uncertain, traditional sources claim it was a Kindite Victory.
