= Battle of Dhat Irq =

599 BCE armed conflict in present-day Saudi Arabia

Date	c. 599 BCE
Location	Dhat Irq in the Hijaz region, now present-day Saudi Arabia
Result	Babylonian victory Annexing the Arabian Peninsula to the Babylonian Empire

Belligerents
Neo-Babylonian Empire	Arab tribes living in the Hijaz

Commanders and leaders
Nebuchadnezzar II	Adnan

Units involved
At least 10,000 soldiers under the Neo-Babylonian Empire	around 3,000 Hijazi Arab tribal warriors

The Battle of Dhat Irq (Arabic: معركة ذات عرق) was a pre-Islamic armed conflict which took place between the forces of Nebuchadnezzar II and the Hijazi Arab tribes around 599 BCE. It ended in a victory for the Neo-Babylonian Empire and occurred in the sixth year of Nebuchadnezzar's rule.

Islamic tradition relates that the biblical prophet Jeremiah was involved during the battle as helping to keep the young Ma'ad ibn Adnan safe from the conflict.

== Background ==
The Arabs in the Hijaz and areas surrounding it had abandoned monotheism and were slowly adopting polytheism and atheism. This issue was brought to the attention of Baruch ben Neriah, who encouraged Nebuchadnezzar II to carry out an invasion on the Arabs as a punishment for their religious situation. In the Islamic traditions, however, it is believed that the battle occurred because God had sent his wrath down on the Arabs for murdering the prophet Shu'ayb ibn Mahdam ibn Dhi Mahdam al-Haduri, and so Nebuchadnezzar II was sent against them.

== Course of conflict ==
In 599 BCE, on the sixth year of his rule, Nebuchadnezzar II and his forces marched on to Najd where he fought off the attacks of several Arabs. He proceeded on a journey to the Hijaz, and news of his journey reached the ears of Adnan who was the ruler of the Hijaz at the time. Adnan ordered all the tribes of the Arabs to gather their forces in preparation for the attack. They encountered Nebuchadnezzar II at the place of Dhat Irq in the Hijaz, where a bloody battle ensued.

According to the Islamic traditions, while the fighting was ongoing, the biblical prophet Jeremiah entered the city of Mecca where he took into his care the young Ma'ad ibn Adnan, who was around twelve years at the time and had been sent away by his father for safety.

== Aftermath ==
Some years after the battle had commenced, Ma'ad ibn Adnan returned to his homeland in the Hijaz after 562 BCE, and succeeded his father in ruling. The cities damaged and destroyed by Nebuchadnezzar II were rebuilt under his rule. Ma'ad would be honoured by his descendants as well, and he became the revered ancestor of several Arab tribes including the Quraysh.

== Historicity ==
While a direct invasion of the Hijaz is not mentioned, some contemporary sources do in fact mention a raid against the restless Arab tribes around 599 BCE, one of them being the Qedarites.

== See also ==
- Qedarites, an Arabian tribe who ruled a kingdom named after themselves and were raided by Nebuchadnezzar II in 599 BCE
- Yawm al-Nakhla, an attempted invasion on the Hijaz by the Himyarite Kingdom in 280 CE
