= Arethas of Najran =

Christian martyr of Arabic origin

Saint Arethas of Najran
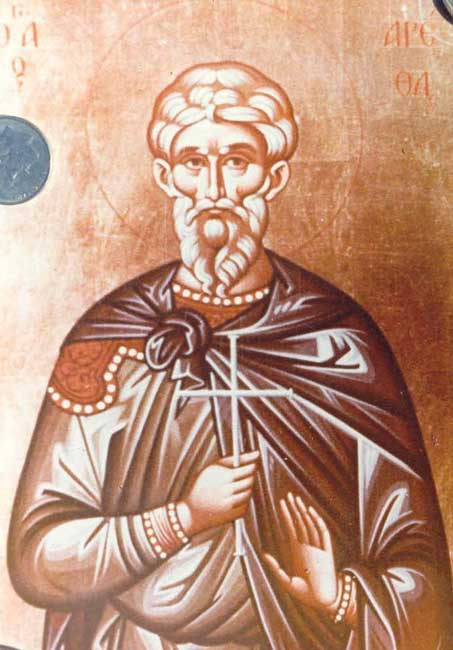
- Byzantine Icon depicting Saint Arethas by Manuel Panselinos

Martyr
- Born: c. 5th century AD; Najran, Himyar (modern-day Saudi Arabia)
- Died: c. 523 AD; Najran, Himyar (modern-day Saudi Arabia)
- Venerated in: Catholic Church; Eastern Orthodox Church; Oriental Orthodox Church; Islam
- Feast: October 24 (Eastern Orthodox and Roman Catholic)

Arethas or Aretas (Arabic: الحارث بن كعب, romanized: al-Ḥārith ibn Kaʿb, born c. 5th century AD - died c. 523 AD), also known as Ḥārith ibn Kaʿb, was the leader of the Miaphysite Christian community of Najran in the early 6th century; he was killed during the persecution of Christians by the king of Yemen, Dhu Nuwas, in 523. News of this tragic story among the rest of the Christian persecutions quickly spread the surrounding areas until it reached the ears of Emperor Justin I of the Byzantine Empire and the Christian Kingdom of Aksum in Ethiopia, who sent in troops to depose Dhu Nuwas and end the persecution in Siege of Najran (523–525).

He is known from the Martyrdom of Arethas which exists in two recensions: the earlier and more authentic, which was found by Michel Le Quien (Oriens Christianus, ii. 428) and was subsequently dated as no later than the 7th century; the later, revised by Simeon Metaphrastes, dates from the 10th century. The Ge'ez and Arabic versions of the text were translated into French in 2006 and the Greek version in 2007.

He is believed to be the progenitor of the Banu al-Harith tribe.

== See also ==
- Arab Christians
