= Al-Dukhul and Hummel Mountains =

Mountains in Najd, Saudi Arabia

Geography
- Location: Saudi Arabia
- Range coordinates: 23°12′29″N 41°34′47″E

Al-Dukhul and Hummel Mountains are linked to popular memory through a verse from the pre-Islamic poet Imru' al-Qais. These locations are situated in the High Najd region, specifically at a site currently designated as Jafrat al-Saqib. The term "Saqib" denotes a prominent mountain, Al-Saqib Mountain, and the surrounding area is named after it. Consequently, these sites are collectively referred to as Al-Saqib. Also was mentioned in the poems of Imru' al-Qais.

== Hummel Mountain ==
Al-Dukhul and Hummel Mountains are situated approximately 500 kilometers west of Riyadh and approximately 150 kilometers north of Ranyah. Mountains Al-Dukhul are situated to the west of Hummel mountain, with an approximate distance of 10 kilometers between them. To the south of Hummel is a mountain range known as Houda Mountains, along with rugged dunes shaped like veins, referred to as "Uruq Subai". The dunes are historically known as the Abdullah bin Kilab Sands. The challenging terrain makes traversing them by vehicle towards Houmal difficult. From the south, mountain Hummel resembles a crouching lion. It is a smooth, black rock formation.

== Al-Dukhul Mountain ==
Al-Dukhul is a series of mountains plateaus that culminate in the well-known Al-Dukhul, which extends towards Hummel. The plateaus exhibit a distinctive coloration in comparison to Hummel, displaying a reddish hue. In the vicinity of Al-Dukhul and Hummel Mountains, numerous ancient wells are believed by the local Bedouin population to date back to Jahiliyyah era. The wells are notable for the sweetness of their water, which constitutes an important source of sustenance for the Bedouin population. The wells are situated a mere few meters to the west of Al-Dukhul Mountains. On Hummel Mountain, a natural basin collects rainwater and floodwater, which is also utilized by the Bedouin population.

The region is renowned for its excellent pastureland, which supports the growth of a variety of herbs, including Lavandula and Centaurea calcitrapa. It is said that the father of Imru' al-Qais, Hujr, consumed this bitter herb, earning him the epithet "the eater of marar." Despite its bitterness, camels favor it, and the taste of their milk reflects this bitterness. Al-Dukhul and Hummel Mountains gained fame through their mention in the Mu'allaqa of Imruʾ al-Qais al-Kindi.

== See also ==
- List of mountains in Saudi Arabia
