= Battle of Salut =

Date	130 A.D
Location	Salut, modern day Oman
Result	Decisive Arab tribal victory
Territorial changes	Parthian withdrawal from Oman

Belligerents
Azd Tribe; Zahran tribe	Parthian garrison of Mazun

Commanders and leaders
Malik ibn Fahm; Amr ibn Fahm ibn Taymallah	Bara ibn Dara ibn Bahman; The Marzuban of Mazun (surrendered)

Strength
10,000 men	30,000-40,000 men

Casualties and losses
Unknown	Unknown

The Battle of Salut was an armed conflict fought between migrating Arab tribes led by Malik ibn Fahm of the Azd and Parthian forces stationed in Oman. In traditional accounts, Salut is described as a key Parthian stronghold, serving as an early fortified settlement linked to regional administration and the Aflaj irrigation systems that sustained local agriculture. Because these water networks and inland settlements were vital to controlling the Omani interior, Salut held significant strategic value for both the established Parthian garrison and the newly arriving Arab migrants.

== Azdi conquest of Oman ==
According to later accounts, the battle took place at Salut and nearby areas, where Malik's army defeated the Parthians in a decisive engagement, forcing them to retreat and eventually completely withdraw from Oman. Later Omani traditions portray the battle as a turning point in the history of Southeast Arabia, marking the beginning of sustained Arab political dominance in Oman. Some accounts further state that the victory enabled Malik ibn Fahm and his followers to secure control over major settlements and trade routes in the Omani interior. Modern historians, however, note that contemporary evidence for the battle is scarce and that the surviving narratives were recorded centuries after the events they describe.

== Aftermath ==
Traditions claim that the Azd tribe established a kingdom in Oman following their victory at Salut. Historiographer J. C. Wilkinson suggests that the degree of success the Azd had over the Parthians in this battle is nonetheless unclear. Even so, the traditions surrounding the battle are frequently portrayed as symbolising the establishment of Arab rule in the region.

However, modern scholars treat these accounts cautiously, suggesting that they may preserve memories of broader processes of Arab tribal migration and consolidation in pre-Islamic Oman rather than a fully documented historical event.
