= Al-Muhalhil =

Poet and warrior in pre-Islamic Arabia

ʿUday ibn Rabīʿa ibn al-Ḥāriṯ at-Taghlibī
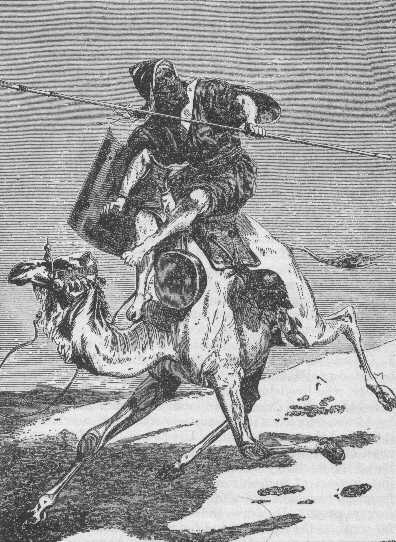
- An imaginative depiction of the knight ʿUday ibn Rabīʿah, known as al-Zīr Sālim
- Born: ʿUday ibn Rabīʿa ibn al-Ḥāriṯ at-Taghlibī, nicknamed al-Zīr Abū Laylā al-Muhalhil c. 443 CE; Najd, Arabian Peninsula
- Died: 531 CE (aged 87–88); Najd, Arabian Peninsula
- Other names: al-Zīr; Abū Laylā; al-Muhalhil
- Occupations: Knight and Poet
- Known for: His bravery and poetry
- Children: Laylā bint al-Muhalhil
- Father: Rabīʿah ibn al-Ḥārith al-Taghlibī
- Relatives: Kulaib ibn Rabiah (brother); Fāṭimah bint Rabīʿah al-Taghlibī (sister); Amr ibn Kulthum (grandson); Imru' al-Qais (nephew)
- Military career
- Wars/Battles: Basus War X; Yawm al-Nahī; Yawm Zabīd; Yawm al-Dhināʾib; Yawm al-Wāridāt; Yawm al-ʿUwayridāt; Yawm ʿAnīq; Yawm al-Qasibat; Yawm Qīḍ (POW)

Abu Layla ʿUday ibn Rabīʿa ibn al-Ḥāriṯ at-Taghlibī (Arabic: أَبُو لَيْلَى عُدَيّ بْن رَبِيعَة بْن الْحَارِث التَّغْلِبِيّ; c. 443 – 531 CE), also known by the nicknames al-Muhalhil ("he who finely weaves poems") and az-Zīr Sālim ("the philander"), was an Arabic pre-Islamic poet and warrior born in Najd. He led the Banu Taghlib tribe in the forty-year long War of Basus.

He was known for having a handsome appearance and an eloquent tongue. In his youth he devoted himself to amusement and courting women, which led his brother Kulaib to call him “Zīr al-nisāʾ” (the companion of women). When Jassās ibn Murrah killed Kulaib, al-Muhalhil rose in anger and abandoned drinking and leisure until he could avenge his brother. This led to the famous conflicts between Bakr and Taghlib, which continued for many years and in which al-Muhalhil played a prominent role.

== Early life ==
In his youth, al-Zīr Sālim was known less for warfare and more for a life of leisure, poetry, and romantic pursuits. He gained a reputation for his eloquence and charm, as well as his fondness for wine, music, and the company of women. This lifestyle earned him the nickname “al-Zīr,” meaning “companion of women,” a title reportedly given to him by his brother Kulaib as a form of criticism. During this period, he was not seen as a serious political or military figure within his tribe.

Despite this carefree lifestyle, al-Zīr developed a strong reputation as a poet and is often credited in classical sources with contributing to the early development of the Arabic qaṣīdah form. His poetry in this early stage frequently revolved around themes of love, tribal pride, and personal expression, reflecting both his personality and the cultural environment of pre-Islamic Arabia.

This phase of his life came to a decisive end following the killing of his brother Kulaib by Jassas ibn Murrah. The event transformed al-Zīr Sālim from a figure associated with leisure into a central leader and avenger, marking the beginning of his role in the Basus War. From that point onward, he abandoned his earlier lifestyle and devoted himself to warfare and vengeance, a shift that would define his legacy in both historical accounts and later epic traditions.

== Basus War ==
Al-Muhalhil became the leader of Taghlib and one of the main figures in the Basus War. During the battle known as the Day of Qidah (one of the final battles of the war), he was captured by al-Ḥārith ibn ʿAbbād without the latter recognizing him. Al-Ḥārith asked him to lead him to ʿUday ibn Rabīʿah al-Muhalhil and promised him safety if he did so. Al-Muhalhil asked: “If I show you where ʿUday is, will my life be spared?” When al-Ḥārith agreed, he replied: “I am ʿUday.” Al-Ḥārith then cut off his forelock and released him.

== Death ==
Al-Muhalhil later went to Yemen, where he stayed among the tribe of Janb. Muʿāwiyah al-Khayr ibn ʿAmr al-Janbī sought the hand of his daughter ʿUbaydah (according to another report, his sister), but al-Muhalhil initially refused until he was compelled to consent. By that time he had grown old and weakened, and he died not long afterward. Another account states that two slaves he had purchased to accompany him on raids grew weary of him and, while traveling with him through a desolate area, decided to kill him. While others claim he was killed by members of the rival Banu Bakr tribe. They did so, thus ending his life and bringing the events of the Basus War to a close.

== Name and lineage ==
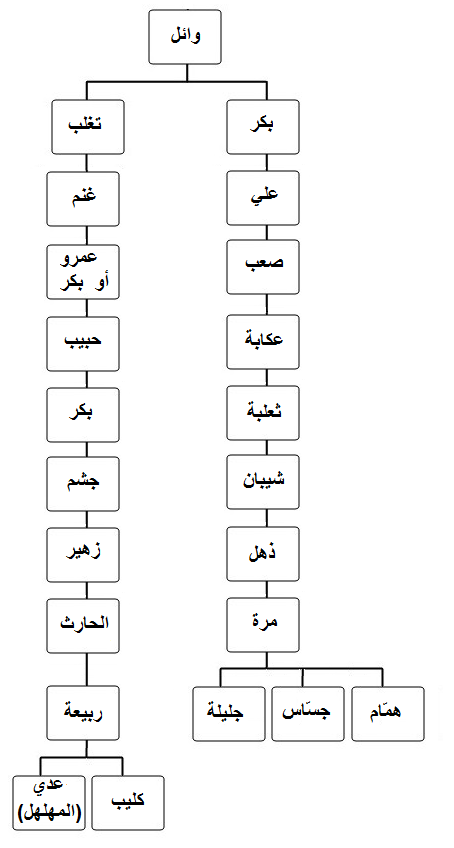
Family tree of the main figures of the Basus War

He is: the knight-poet al-Muhalhil ʿUday ibn Rabīʿah ibn al-Ḥārith ibn Zuhayr ibn Jusham ibn Bakr ibn Ḥabīb ibn ʿAmr ibn Ghanm ibn Taghlib ibn Wāʾil ibn Qāsiṭ ibn Hinb ibn Afṣā ibn Duʿmī ibn Jadīlah ibn Asad ibn Rabīʿah ibn Nizār ibn Maʿadd ibn Adnan.

== Titles and kunyah ==
ʿUday ibn Rabīʿah was known by several titles, the most famous being:

- al-Zīr

His brother Kulaib reportedly gave him the nickname “Zīr al-nisāʾ” (companion of women) because he spent much time among them.

- al-Muhalhil

It is said that he received this nickname because he wore worn or tattered clothing. Another explanation is derived from a verse he composed in which he used the word *halhala*. It is also said that he was called al-Muhalhil because he “loosened” poetry, meaning he refined and softened its structure.

Another famous verse attributed to him states:

> “Were it not for the wind, the people of Ḥijr would hear > the clashing of swords striking against shields.”

His niece Al-Yamamah bint Kulayyib is reported to have recited verses about his death.

- Abū Laylā

This was his kunyah (honorific). He had no sons, so he was called after his eldest daughter, Laylā. He also had another daughter named ʿUbaydah. Laylā married Kulthum ibn Mālik of Taghlib and gave birth to ʿAmr ibn Kulthum, the famous poet of the Muʿallaqa. His daughter ʿUbaydah married Muʿāwiyah al-Khayr ibn ʿAmr al-Janbī of Madh'hij and bore the clan of Banū ʿUbaydah. Sources differ regarding the names of his daughters, though they agree he had only two; some say Laylā and ʿUbaydah, others Hind and ʿUbaydah, and others Salmā and Sulaymā.

== Poetry ==
Al-Muhalhil’s poetry was a means of stirring people to seek vengeance. He constantly lamented his brother in his verses so that the tragedy would remain vivid among his tribe as it was within himself. Most of the poems he composed mourning his brother describe his tears and grief, repeatedly calling out to him and praising his virtues, generosity, and bravery.

Among his notable verses are:

My two companions—when all people blame me for what time has done to me.
Is it because I was the one—had there ever been perfection in anyone?

The announcers brought me news of Kulaib’s death, and I said to them:
Has the earth swayed beneath us, or have its firm mountains trembled?
O Kulaib, there is no good in this world, nor in those within it,
If you have left it to those who would abandon it as you did.

Another example of the poems attributed to him:

Within my chest, because of Kulaib, are deep sorrows,
Restless thoughts that reopen the wounds.

My wife no longer recognizes me when she sees me,
Pale-faced, unable to bear even lighthearted talk.

Once, when I would comb my hair,
I cared not for ruin nor for reform.

Miserable is the one who lives a wretched life,
Pale-faced, wandering, distraught.

O my two companions, call out to Kulaib for me,
And know that he will meet death face to face.

O my two companions, call out to Kulaib for me,
Then say to him: “Good morning to you.”

O my two companions, call out to Kulaib for me,
Before the eyes can behold the dawn.

We have never seen people like ourselves on the day we marched,
Seizing dominion morning and evening.

We struck with fine, sharp blades,
Leaving ruins above them filled with cries.

Our guest departed the dwelling and turned away—
May God excuse our guest on the day he left.

Time has taken generosity away from us;
O cruelty of time, how can you be satisfied with such tyranny?

Woe to my mother, and woe for a slain man
From Banū Taghlib—woe upon woe.

O slain one, born of a noble lineage,
Whose loss has turned my hair gray.

How can I find solace from weeping, when my people
Have perished—how then can I hope for any success?

== In popular culture ==
The character of ʿUday ibn Rabīʿah (al-Zīr Sālim) has appeared in several television productions, including:

- Al-Zeer Salem (TV series) starring Sulaf Fawakherji, Samer al-Masri, and Abed Fahed. The role of al-Zīr was portrayed by Sulom Haddad.
- Al-Zeer Salem (1984 TV series) starring Mahmoud Yassin, Youssef Shaaban, and Firdous Abdel Hamid. The role was played by Mahmoud Yassin.
- The play Al-Zeer Salem (play) starring Nabil El-Halfawy and Thuraya Ibrahim, in which the role was portrayed by Nabil El-Halfawy.
- The television series Epic of Love and Departure depicting the story of al-Zīr Sālim and the Basus War, where the role was played by Salah El-Saadany.
