= Yawm al-Nakhla =

3rd-century armed conflict

Date	c. 280 CE
Location	Mecca, present-day Saudi Arabia
Result	Tribal Arabs' victory: Hassan ibn 'Abd-Kulal is captured

Belligerents
Himyarite Kingdom	Tribes of Arabia

Commanders and leaders
Hassan ibn 'Abd-Kulal al-Himyari (POW)	Fihr ibn Malik

Units involved
Himyarites soldiers (unknown number)	Arabian tribes of Mudar, Banu Kinana, Banu Asad, Banu Hudhayl, Banu Tamim and the Quraysh

The event of Yawm al-Nakhla (Arabic: يوم نخلة) was an armed conflict between the forces of the Himyarite Kingdom and the Tribes of Arabia which happened around the 3rd century CE in pre-Islamic Mecca.

== Background ==
The Himyarite military general, Hassan ibn 'Abd-Kulal ibn Muthawwib Dhu Harith al-Himyari, set out with a large army to take the stones of the Kaaba and transport them from Mecca to Yemen so that the Arabs would perform the Hajj there instead.

== Course of conflict ==
When Hassan ibn 'Abd-Kulal and his forces arrived, they settled at Wadi Nakhla before raiding nearby tents and blocking off roads leading to Mecca. The news of Hassan's attempted siege reached the Arabian tribes living in Mecca, who went out in numbers to fight against him. The ruler of Mecca at the time, Fihr ibn Malik, led the tribes in the battle against the Himyarites. The battle ended with a victory for the tribal forces and the capture of Hassan ibn 'Abd-Kulal.

=== Aftermath ===
Hassan ibn 'Abd-Kulal was imprisoned in Mecca for at least three years, before he was able to ransom himself out of prison. He died on his journey home to Yemen.

== Historicity ==
Some Muslim historians rejected the narrative of this battle, stating that the Banu Khuza'ah were the ones ruling Mecca during the time of Hassan ibn 'Abd-Kulal, and not the Quraysh.

== See also ==
- Aksumite-Sasanian wars
- Abyssinian raid on Mecca (570)
