= Warfare in pre-Islamic Arabia =

Military activity in Arabia before Islam

Warfare in pre-Islamic Arabia refers to war and conflict in pre-Islamic Arabia, including both on the Arabian Peninsula, and the Arab world more generally, occurring before the rise of Islam.

Pre-Islamic Arabia was characterized by persistent war (ḥarb, in Arabic): tribal warfare and ethnic conflict, raiding culture (ghazū), ambitions and competition surrounding dynastic succession, and a multipolar world involving complex geopolitical tensions and alliances, such as the formation of tribal confederations and the involvement from foreign powers, both empires and kingdoms, like the Romans, Persians, and Ethiopians. Warfare was structured by tribal conventions, including honor codes and blood feud. Failure to fulfill ones duties, to the tribe or the clan, was considered one of the worst crimes.

The evolution of Arabian warfare was dictated by the harsh geography of the peninsula. In South Arabia, organized states such as Saba, Ma'in, Qataban, and Himyar competed for control over hydraulic infrastructure and transcontinental trade routes, which served as the primary casus belli for nearly every significant engagement. Central Arabia and its vast deserts was dominated by confederations of nomadic tribes.

== Tribal warfare ==
=== Shared responsibility ===
In pre-Islamic tribal societies, warfare was carried out by men, the adult males of a tribe. The men of a tribe had a shared legal responsibility and had an obligation of mutual assistance, meaning that if a member of theirs was killed by another tribe, they would jointly carry out a blood feud, meaning that they would kill a member of the opposing tribe in retaliation, or, they would jointly seek out blood money for compensation.

=== Types of alliances ===
In pre-Islamic society, and in the absence of state power, alliances and agreements between tribes formed the basis of security. Alliances formed between groups, not individuals. In Arabic, an alliance is denoted by the word ḥilf, whose root ḥlf denotes an "oath", signifying the use of an oath to confirm the alliance, a common custom in the ancient Near East in general. Discussions of the pre-Islamic ḥilf suggest that it could take on three main forms: (1) a temporary alliance for a specific purpose, such as a war or for trade (2) alliance between equals or near-equals for the purpose of long-term co-operation or (3) alliances between descent groups, usually unequal (such as clientage). Sometimes, alliances led to a gradual merging between the two parties. Once merged, these larger groups may invent a mythic ancestor for the new entity to consolidate the new in-group. In this process, the original genealogies of the parties may be forgotten or revised.

=== Pledge of allegiance ===
The pledge of allegiance, referred to in the Quran and Islamic literature as the bay'ah, is a type of oath established between a superior and an inferior party, which is used by inferior party to formally acknowledge the superior party as the leader in their relationship, and to promise them their obedience and support. The pledge of allegiance, in Islamic times, has its roots in the long-attested version of this custom from pre-Islamic Arabian tradition.

=== Rights and obligations of allies ===
Tribal alliances entailed rights and obligations. The members of an alliance could pledge to adhere to one another, to provide help or relief to one another in times of need, and to act jointly in defense and support. In some cases, additional stipulations may be included, such as the practice of mutual inheritance (or inheritance by alliance) and common liability (such as in the case of a blood feud).

== Army organization ==
=== Weapons and protective gear ===
Arabian armies were not usually as powerful as those of Rome or Persia, but they followed and adopted military developments from these empires.

Weaponry used by Arabian armies included swords, spears, daggers, battle axes, and bow-and-arrows (archery). They also used protective gear, including armor and helmets. Many types of armor were used, including plate armor, laminar armor, scale armor and chain mail armor. In times of war, military foritifications including both forts and trenches were used.

Archaeological discoveries from Himyar show that awards were distributed for notable military service, including trophies and/or standards.

=== Army units, divisions, and sizes ===
The Notitia Dignitatum, a Roman document from the early fifth century, documents the use of multiple types of military units (structured armed forces) in Arab armies:

- Heavy cavalry (equitates)
- Mounted archers within equitates units (equitates sagittarii)
- Heavy cavalry that utilized a wedge formation (Cuneus equitatum secondorum clibanorum Palmirenorum)
- Light cavalry (alae)
- Infantry (cohortes)
- Camel cavalry (ala dromadarium)

Multiple Ancient South Arabian inscriptions record the sizes of different types of army units. These sources list ranges of army sizes of 170–2000 for infantry, 3–300 for cavalry, and 750–3000 for camel cavalry.

The army of the Kingdom of Himyar had four major divisions. The first was the royal battalion, under the direction of the king or a general. The second was a division made up of troops enlisted from highland communities. The third was cavalry, and the fourth was mercenaries or Bedouin allies. In addition to its own, organized army, Himyar also had tribal militias that it could call in times of need. Within the army, there were a total of five ranks. In terms of authority, from the highest to the lowest, these five levels were: the king, the general, the tribal leader, the direct leader of a particular number of soldiers, and finally at the bottom, the individual soldier.

=== Fortifications and walled oases ===
Archaeological evidence from north-western Arabia indicates that some pre-Islamic settlements developed large-scale oasis fortification systems. A regional "walled oases" phenomenon has been documented at sites including Dumat al-Jandal, Tayma, Qurayyah, Khaybar, Ha'it, and al-Huwayyit, where outer walls enclosed not only inhabited areas but also agricultural land and, in some cases, even burial zones. These works differed from smaller forts or urban defense systems because they surrounded much of the oasis landscape itself. This phenomenon in north-west Arabia may have begun in the late fourth or early third millennium BCE, possibly influenced by Early Bronze Age defensive traditions in the southern Levant, and later expanded with the growth of trans-Arabian trade and caravan kingdoms.

The western rampart of Dumat al-Jandal, ancient Adummatu, is one of the best-studied examples of this. Excavations and survey suggest that its western enclosure wall was almost 2.5 km long, in some places preserved to more than 4.5 m high, and probably enclosed about 40 hectares of land. The wall was constructed in multiple phases with stone curtain walls, mudbrick superstructures, buttresses, bastions and stairways, indicating that it could support regular guarding and military use. Radiocarbon and pottery evidence suggest that the main period of the construction was during the Hellenistic era, some time from the late fourth to the mid-second centuries BCE. However, earlier Assyrian sources indicate that Adummatu ws already fortified in earlier periods. The wall excavated at Adummatu also had non-military functions: it helped protect cultivated land and dwellings from blown sand and flash floods, and its monumental western facade had an aesthetic role travelers arriving from the desert would get a sense of the power and granduer of the oasis. These fortifications therefore show that warfare and security in pre-Islamic Arabia were not limited to mobile tribal raiding or open battle: defense systems played an important role for sedentary agricultural territories.

=== War animals (horses, camels, and elephants) ===
While the earliest evidence of the horse on the Arabian Peninsula appears in the mid-1st millennium BC, Arabian armies followed the trends of surrounding regions and, according to inscriptions, artistic depictions, and foreign literary sources, cavalry are shown to have become a common feature of some Arabian armies (especially the southern kingdoms) during the third and fourth centuries, soon after their adoption in armies of the Near East, and they were associated with the dominant class. Arabian armies made use of both heavy cavalry and light cavalry, and heavy cavalry was a particularly crucial feature of Lakhmid forces. In general, however, armies would not use more than a few hundred cavalry at most, and in the Late Antique period, both in Arabia and beyond, infantry as opposed to cavalry represented the core and most important unit of the army. The exaggerated importance of the horse in the memory of history of Arabian warfare is a product of later legend and mythology, and even the breeding of the Arabian horse is more likely to have happened along the Nile in Egypt. In the sixth century, there is evidence that the Aksumite general Abraha used war elephants, an idea that has adopted into Islamic traditions now known as the Year of the Elephant.

== Foreign empires and kingdoms ==
The Late Antique period was heavily characterized by the indirect involvement of foreign powers, especially the Byzantine Empire, the Sasanian Empire, and the Kingdom of Aksum.

Byzantines and Sasanians sought to project power into, defend themselves from offensive nomadic incursions from, and wage proxy war on each other through, the Arabian territories. Defensively, many fortifications were constructed on the Arabian frontier, particularly by the Romans, to protect from the invasion of nomadic Arab tribes. Examples of these fortifications include the Limes Arabicus and Qasr al-Azraq. Both empires also usually avoided direct military engagement in the peninsula to carry out these goals, but instead tried to accomplish them by forming strategic alliances with powerful Arab kingdoms, especially the Ghassanids and Lakhmids. On some occasions, however, foreign powers directly sought to conquer parts of Arabia. In 106 AD, the Roman Empire conquered the Nabataean Kingdom and established the Roman province of Arabia Petraea. Beginning in the third century, when the Sasanian dynasty claimed power over the Persian empire from the Parthians, Persia began undertaking military engagements in Eastern Arabia, exerting significant control into the region to defend their western frontier, control trade routes, and access mineral resources. One late Sasanian fort is known from the site of Fulayj in Oman, and it remained occupied until the early Islamic period. In the early sixth century, the Ethiopian Aksumites conquered South Arabia. Later in that same century in the reign of the Persian emperor Khosrow I, the Aksumite–Persian wars led to Sasanian control over the south.

== Religious ideology ==
Religious ideology influenced or was associated with Arabian warfare. In the early 1st millennium BC, Karib'il Watar imposed the cult of Almaqah onto local cities, such as Nashshan, after expanding the domain of the Sabaean kingdom through his conquests, forcing local leaders to construct a temple dedicated to the god. The invasion of Himyar by the Ethiopian Christian Kingdom of Aksum was precipitated by the slaughter of the Christian community of Najran by the Himyarite Jewish leadership. Subsequently, after Aksumite rule in the region was established, a period of Christian rule came over South Arabia that lasted until the end of the reign of the king Abraha.

The intermingling of religious ideology with warfare is also present with the Quran, such as in its doctrine that those who died in righteous warfare in God's path would be granted paradise, an idea likely introduced into the Arabian milieu through the influence of Byzantine wartime propaganda. Eschatology and apocalypticism also influenced Arabian and Quranic views on warfare and pacifism during the Late Antique period.

== Sources ==
Literature from pre-Islamic Arabia does not survive. Coverage of these conflicts relies on pre-Islamic Arabian inscriptions, inscriptions and literature from surrounding regions (such as Greek and Roman literature), non-contemporary Arabic literature, Islamic-era compilations of pre-Islamic Arabic poetry, and archaeology (finding forts, weapons, artistic rock representations of warfare, and skeletons with battle wounds). Some information about customs like blood feud, random, and more, can also be gleaned from the Quran and the Constitution of Medina.

In Islamic times, an entire genre of narrative emerged to talk about, transmit stories of, and valorize the warfare of the pre-Islamic Arabian past, called the Days of the Arabs (ayyām al-ʿarab) to emphasize the battle-days in which warfare and combat took place.

== See also ==
- List of wars and battles in pre-Islamic Arabia
- Early Muslim conquests
- Strategikon of Maurice
