= Kulaib ibn Rabiah =

King of the Adnanites (died c. 494)

Kulaib ibn Rabi'ah al-Taghlibi
- King of the Adnanites
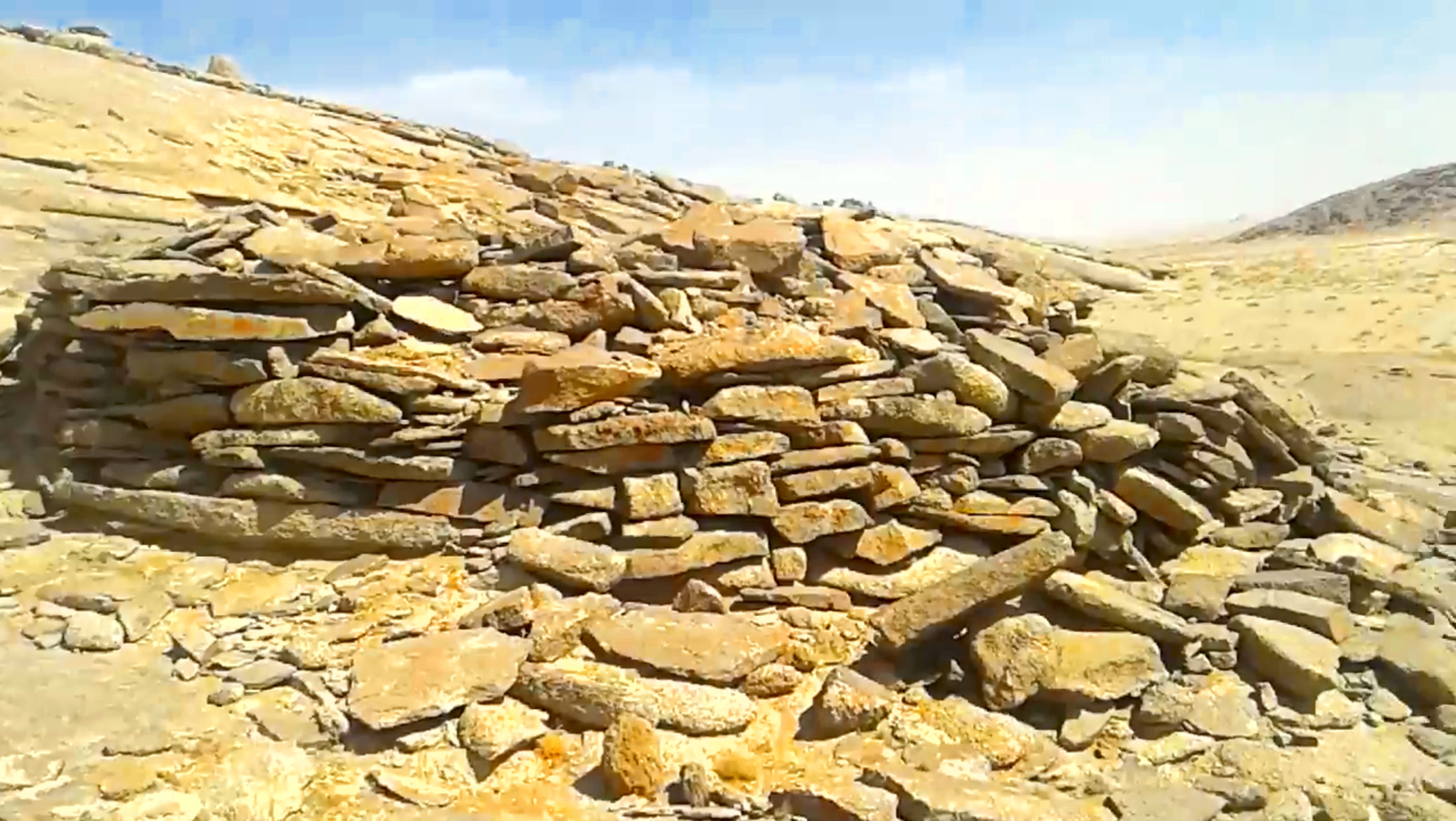
- A burial mound, which is attributed to be the resting place of Kulaib ibn Rabiah, located in Wadi Khaitan
- Reign: Ended in c. 494 CE
- Predecessor: Position started
- Successor: Abu Layla al-Muhalhel (brother) , al-Jarw ibn Kulaib (son)
- Died: c. 494 CE; Najd, Arabian Peninsula
- Burial: Wadi Khaitan
- House: Taghlib

Kulaib ibn Rabi'ah al-Taghlibi (Arabic: كليب بن ربيعة التغلبي) also known as Wa'il al-Taghlibi was a pre-Islamic tribal chief and the first of the Adnanites to become a king over them. Under his rule, the Adnanites gained prominence in the Arabian Peninsula over their Qahtanite counterparts. Kulaib's assassination in 494 AD sparked the Basus War.

== Biography ==
=== Family ===
His full lineage is given as: Kulaib, son of Rabiah, son of al-Harith, son of Zuhayr, son of Jashm, son of Bakr, son of Habib, son of 'Amr, son of Ghanim, son of Taghlib ibn Wa'il. Hence, he is from the Taghlib tribe. Kulaib's descent from Adnan is also confirmed by the fact that Taghlib is descended from Adnan. Adnan's descent from the biblical patriarch Ishmael hence makes Kulaib amongst the later generation of Ishmaelites.

Kulaib was the brother of the famous poet 'Udayy ibn Rabiah, more commonly known as Abu Layla al-Muhalhel. Kulaib also had a son named al-Jarw, who would succeed him in the ruling of the Taghlib.

=== Consolidation of power ===
Kulaib became very dominant amongst the Adnanite tribes living in Najd at some point of time. Under his command, the Adnanite forces were able to defeat the Qahtanite forces of Himyar and Madhhij. Kulaib's reign paved the way for the Adnanites to attain prominence in the Arabian Peninsula, especially in Najd.

=== Death ===
Kulaib ibn Rabi'ah was ultimately murdered by his brother-in-law, Jassas ibn Murrah from the Banu Bakr. According to the traditional narrative, Kulaib had shot a prized camel belonging to al-Basus, a woman of Banu Tamim who was staying under the protection of her nephew Jassas. This violation of his protection angered Jassas, who then stabbed Kulaib to death.

== Cause of the Basus War ==
The assassination of Kulaib made the Taghlib oppose their brother tribe, the Banu Bakr. They fought for forty years, the conflicts between them being known as the Basus War. The Taghlib were originally the victors of the war, but suffered significant losses due to surprise attacks from their rival tribe.

== Personal life ==
=== Personality ===
Kulaib had a brash and arrogant demeanor, but his main interest was the protection of his fellow Adnanites.

== Historicity ==
=== Time period ===
The death of Kulaib is estimated to be around 494 CE, as the events of the Basus War ended around 534 CE after forty years of fighting. The Dictionary of Arab Poets gives a similar estimation of his death date to around 492 CE.

=== Burial place ===
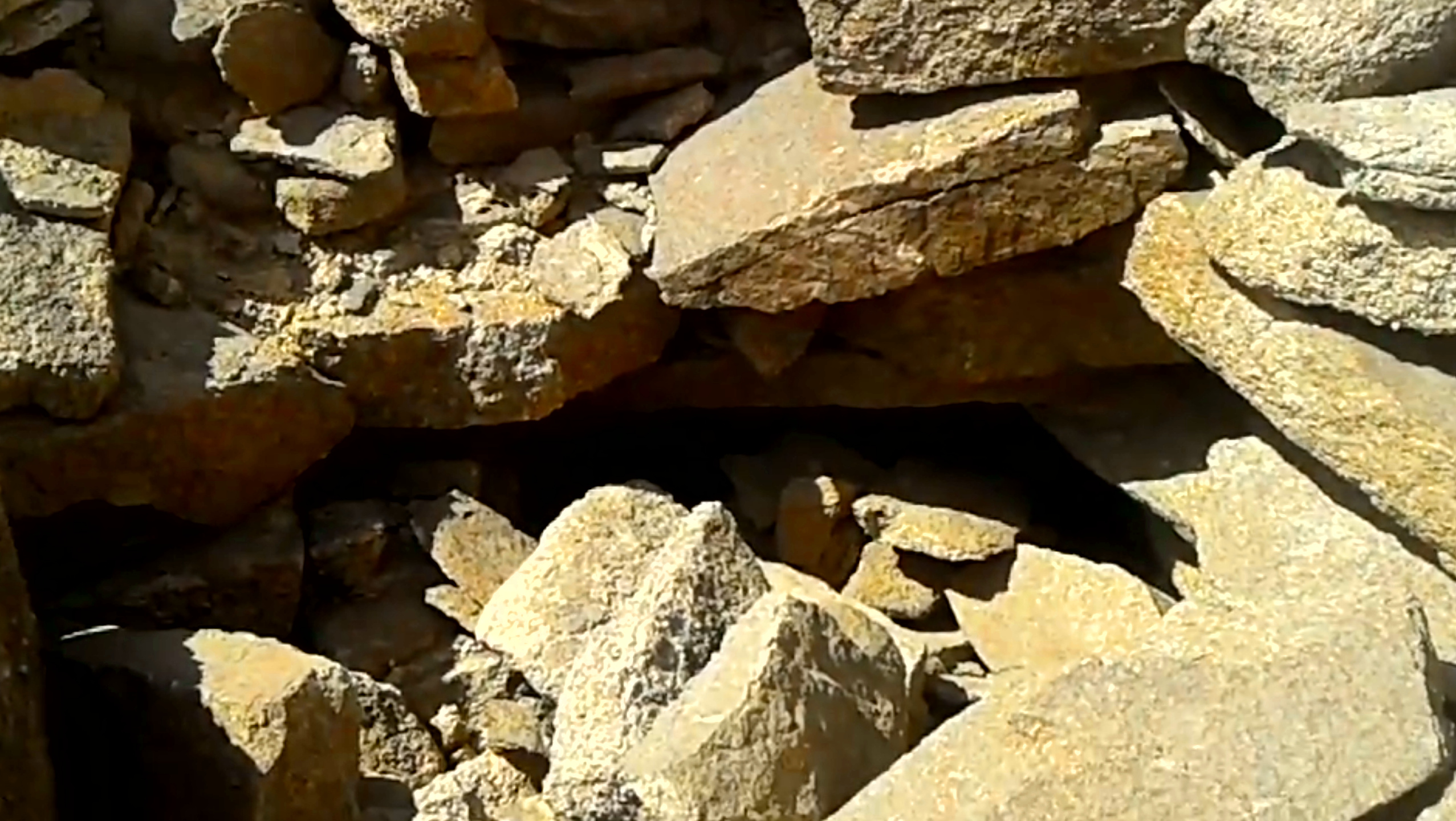
A closer look at the tomb attributed to Kulaib in the area of Wadi Khaitan

A tomb traditionally attributed to Kulaib is located in Wadi Khaitan between Mecca and Abha. It is located in a valley where many water sources are located. In 2008, the site was almost exhumed after a cable car installation was planned at the site, but fortunately the project was relocated.

== See also ==
- Taghlib
- Abu Layla al-Muhalhel
- List of Arabic-language poets
