= Days of the Arabs =

Literary genre about pre-Islamic Arabian war

In Arabic literature, the Days of the Arabs (Arabic: أيام العرب, romanized: ayyām al-ʿArab) is a genre of legendary narratives about warfare in pre-Islamic Arabia. The genre represents the oldest extant Arabic narratives.

A few of the battles of the Ayyām (Battle Days) were major, but most were minor skirmishes. Skirmishes could escalate into major battles, as conflicts or petty disputes between individuals could grow to include entire tribes on opposing sides.

The narratives typically recount raids and battles among tribes of Arabia, and present themselves as realistic accounts, though their transmission and shaping were influenced by social and scholarly concerns. The texts are largely prose, punctuated with citations of pre-Islamic poetry (prosimetric), with the poem attributed to the protagonist of the story, or to a transmitter or compiler who added it later. Quoting poems of the protagonists of these battles played the role of presenting the narrative as credible and believable.

== Transmission and performance ==
Among Bedouin and semi-Bedouin communities, the ayyām (Days) were transmitted as forms of oral tribal history, comparable to other tribal oral historiographical traditions. This mode of transmission rendered the narratives plastic and flexible, allowing them to be reshaped according to present social expectations and the interaction between performer and audience. The genre is marked by a strong emphasis on violence, masculinity, and martial values, which scholars have interpreted as reflecting, at least in part, authentic expressions of a Bedouin or semi-Bedouin milieu.

Performance typically took place in private gatherings, and transmission was the domain of specialists. A distinction is often drawn between the rāwī (the transmitter or performer) and the scholar, who systematized, contextualized, and eventually committed the material to writing.

== Formal characteristics ==
Characteristic features of the ayyām include a strong focus on genealogical history, integrating heroes into tribal and kinship networks, as well as detailed attention to geography and topography, paralleling concerns found in pre-Islamic poetry. Chronology is generally weak: the narratives lack absolute dating and offer only limited relative chronology. Instead, poetry functions as the principal means of contextualization and authentication.

== Compilation and canonization ==
Although the ayyām circulated earlier as scattered oral and written materials, the formation of the genre as a distinct textual corpus is attributed primarily to the Basran grammarian and lexicographer Abū ʿUbayda Maʿmar b. al-Muthannā (110–209/728–824). A disciple of Abū ʿAmr b. al-ʿAlāʾ, Abū ʿUbayda applied philological methods developed in the grammatical schools to collect, classify, and systematize ayyām material circulating in the garrison cities.

He is credited with producing two monographs on the ayyām. The first was a shorter work comprising 75 or 150 days, and the second, a much larger collection titled Maqātil al-fursān, reportedly containing 1200 or 1600 days. Neither one has survived. Nevertheless, these works formed the basis of nearly all subsequent ayyām traditions preserved in later sources. Through this process, Abū ʿUbayda established a canonical corpus that could be transmitted and taught as a coherent body of knowledge, and his work served as a major transmission bottleneck for the genre.

Following Abū ʿUbayda, the genre proliferated, with several influential authors contributing to its further transmission and adaptation. Some early authors, such as Ibn al-Kalbī and his father, adopted a more explicitly historical approach to the ayyām. Al-Maidani lists 132 pre-Islamic battle-days in the 29th chapter in his Madjma al-amthal. His accounts of each battle are short, but helpful for quickly grasping each one.

== Place in Islamic historiography ==
The ayyām played a limited role in early universal histories, where they were selectively incorporated or reshaped. Authors influenced by the methodological principles of the ahl al-hadith often excluded the genre altogether. This tendency is exemplified by al-Tabari, who mentions the ayyām only once, in connection with the Battle of Dhi Qar.

After al-Ṭabari, the ayyām largely disappeared from mainstream historiographical writing, re-emerging only in the thirteenth century with authors such as Ibn al-Athir.

== Sources ==
- Mittwoch, E. (1993). "Aiyām Al-ʿArab". In Scheiner, J.; Janos, D. (eds.). E.J. Brill's First Encyclopaedia of Islam, 1913–1936. Brill. pp. 218–219.
- Toral-Niehoff, Isabel (2021). "Talking about Arab Origins: The Transmission of the ayyām al-ʿarab in Kūfa, Baṣra and Baghdād" (PDF). In Scheiner, J.; Janos, D. (eds.). The Place to Go Contexts of Learning in Baghdād, 750-1000 C.E. Darwin Press. pp. 43–69.
