= List of Arabic-language poets =

List of Arabic language poets, most of whom were or are Arabs and who wrote in the Arabic language. Each year links to the corresponding "[year] in poetry" article. The alphabetical order is by first names.

== A ==
- Ahmadou Bamba (1853–1927)
- Abbas Al Akkad (1889–1964)
- Abbas Ibn al-Ahnaf (750–809) (عباس بن الأحنف)
- Abdallah Zrika (1953)
- Abd Allah ibn Rawahah (d.630)
- Abd Al-Rahman Abnudi (b. 1938)
- Abd al-Rahman al-Fazazi (d. 1230)
- Abd Al-Rahman Shokry (1886–1958)
- Abd al-Wahhab Al-Bayyati (1926–1999)
- Abdelaziz al-Malzuzi (d. 1298)
- Abdel Latif Moubarak (b. 1964)
- Abdel Mohsin Musellem (b.1958)
- Abderrahman El Majdoub (d. 1568)
- Abdul Rahman Yusuf (b. 1970)
- Abdullah ibn al-Mu'tazz (861–908)
- Abo Al Qassim Al Shabbi
- Abu 'Afak (7th Century)
- Abu al-Faraj al-Isfahani (897–967)
- Abd al-Jalil al-Tabataba'i (1775–1850)
- Abu al-Hasan al-Shushtari (1212–1269)
- Abu Nuwas (750–813)
- Abu Tammam (c. 805–845)
- Abu-l-'Atahiya (748–828)
- Ahmad al-Tifashi (d. 1253)
- Ahmed Shawqi (1868–1932)
- al-Akhtal (c. 640–710)
- Maymun Ibn Qays Al-a'sha (570–625)
- al-Buhturi (820–897)
- al-Farazdaq (d. c. 729)
- al-Fath ibn Khaqan (817–861)
- Adunis (b. 1928–)
- Ali Al-Fazzani (1936–2000)
- Ali Al Jallawi (b. 1975–)
- 'Ali ibn Muhammad al-Busiri (d. 1296)
- al-Khansa (600–670)
- Abu ibn Abd Allah al-Ma'arri (973–1057)
- Al-Mutanabbi (915–965)
- al-Nabighah al-Dhubyani (6th century)
- 'Alqama ibn 'Abada (6th century)
- Al-Rabi ibn Abu al-Huqayq (7th Century)
- al-Walid ibn Yazid, (d. 744)
- Amr ibn Kulthum (6th century)
- 'Antara Ibn Shaddad (d. c. 580)
- Asma bint Marwan

== B ==
- Badawi al-Jabal, (b. 1907)
- Badi' al-Zaman al-Hamadhani (967–1007)
- Badr Shakir al-Sayyab, (d. 1964)
- Bashshar ibn Burd (714–784)
- Bashir Copti, (1929–) (بشير عيسى قبطي)
- Bhai Nand Lal (1633–1713)- composed mainly in Urdu and Persian

== F ==
- Fadwa Toukan (1917–2003)
- Farhat, Southern Mahjari
- Fawzi Maluf (d. 1930), figure of the Mahjar
- Francis Marrash (1836–1873)

== G ==
- Jibra'il Dallal

== H ==
- Hafiz Ibrahim (1872–1932)
- Harith Ibn Hilliza Ul-Yashkuri
- Hassan ibn Thabit (d. c. 674)
- Hilmi M. Zawati (b.1953) (حلمي زواتي)

== I ==
- Ibn al-Farid (1181–1235
- Ibn al-Khatib (1313–1374)
- Ibn al-Rumi, (d. 896)
- Muhyi al-din ibn al-'Arabi, (d. 1240)
- Ibn Duraid (837–934)
- Ibn Juzayy (1321–1340)
- Ibn Khafajah, (b. 1039)
- Ibn Quzman (1078–1160)
- Ibn Munadhir (d. 814)
- Ibn Sahl of Sevilla (1212–1251)
- Ibn Zaydún (1003–1071)
- Ibrahim Al-Mausili (742–804)
- Ibrahim Nagi (1898–1953)
- Ibrahim Touqan (1905–1941
- Iliyya Abu Madi, (d. 1957)
- Iman Mersal
- Imru' al-Qais (6th century)
- Ismail ibn Yasar al-Nisai
- Ibrahim Niass (1900–1975)

== J ==
- Jabal ibn Jawwal (7th Century)
- Jamal Jumá (b. 1956)
- Jamil Sidqi al-Zahawi, (d. 1936)
- Jarir ibn `Atiyah al-Khatfi (d. c. 728)

== K ==
- Kulaib ibn Rabiah (5th century)
- Ka'b bin Zuhayr (6th century)
- Kahlil Gibran (1883– 1931)
- Khalil ibn Ahmad (718–791)
- Khalil Mutran (d. 1949)
- Kumait Ibn Zaid (679–743)
- Kuthayyir (ca. 660-ca. 723)
- Khalifa Niass (1881–1959)

== L ==
- Labīd (560–661)
- Layla al-Akhyaliyyah, (d. 704)

== M ==
- Mahjoub Sharif (1948–2014)
- Mahmoud Darwish (1941–2008)
- Mahmud Sami al-Barudi (d. 1904)
- Mana Al Otaiba, (b. 1946)
- Mansur al-Hallaj (d. 922)
- Maram al-Masri (b. 1962)
- Maruf al Rusafi
- Maryana Marrash (1848–1919)
- Masoud Juni (1938-1991)
- Mohamed Ghozzi (20th century)
- Mohammed Abdalbari (b. 1985)
- Mohammed Bennis (1948–)
- Mohammed ibn Qasim ibn Zakur (d. 1708)
- Mourid Barghouti (b. 1944)
- Muhammad bin Hani al Andalusi al Azdi, (d. 973)
- Muhammad Ibn Abbad Al Mutamid (1040–1095)
- Muhammad ibn Ammar (c. 1031–1086)
- Muhammad Mahdi Al-Jawahiri, (d. 1998)
- Muhammad Tahir ul-Qadri
- Muhammed Almagut (1934–2006)
- Muhannad Al-Shawi, (b. 1974)
- Malick Sy (1855–1922)

== N ==
- Najma Idrees
- Nazik Al-Malaika (1923–2007)
- Nizar Qabbani (1923–1998)

== O ==
- Orkhan Muyassar (1911?–1965), surrealist author

== Q ==
- al-Qarawi, Southern Mahjari
- Qassim Haddad (b. 1948)
- Qays ibn al-Mullawah, (d. 688)

== S ==
- Saadi Youssef (1934–2021)
- Said Akl (1911–2014)
- Salah Jaheen (1930–1986)
- Salah Labaki (1906–1955)
- Salman Masalha (b. 1953)
- Samaw'al ibn 'Adiya (d. c. 560)
- Samih al-Qasim (20th century)
- Sidi Boushaki (1394–1453)

== T ==
- Tarafah ibn al 'Abd (6th century)
- Tawfiq Sayigh (d. 1971), modernist proponent of prose poetry
- Tawfiq Ziad (1929–1994)

== U ==
- 'Umar Abu Rishah (1910–1990)
- Umar Ibn Abi Rabi'ah (d. 712)

== W ==
- Waddah al-Yaman (d. 708)
- Wallada bint al-Mustakfi (994–1091)

== Y ==
- Yusuf Ghusub (b. 1900), Lebanese symbolist

== Z ==
- Zuhayr ibn Abī Sūlmā (520–609)

== See also ==
- Arabic literature
- Modern Arabic literature
- Arabic poetry
- List of Arabic-language writers
