= 7th century in poetry =

== Europe ==
=== Poets ===
- Cædmon likely flourishes from approximately 657 to 680 in Northumbria.
- Laidcenn mac Buith Bannaig, Irish (d. 661)

=== Works ===
- Cædmon's Hymn, Old English
- Dream of the Rood, Old English, possible date
- Hisperica Famina, Hiberno-Latin

== Byzantine Empire ==
=== Poets ===
- George Pisida, in Greek

== Arabic world ==
=== Poets ===
- Abu 'Afak, from Hijaz, a Jewish poet writing in Arabic
- Layla al-Akhyaliyya, early Banu Uqayl tribe female poet
- Al-Rabi ibn Abu al-Huqayq fl. in Arabia just before the Hejira
- Eleazar Kalir, from Kirjath-sepher, writing in Hebrew
- Al-Khansa, in Arabia, early Islamic woman poet
- Jabal ibn Jawwal, a Jewish convert to Islam, in Arabic

==== Births of Arab-language poets ====
- al-Akhtal (c. 640–710)
- Kumait Ibn Zaid (679–743)
- Kuthayyir (ca. 660-ca. 723)

==== Deaths of Arab-language poets ====
- Maymun Ibn Qays Al-a'sha (570–625)
- Antarah ibn Shaddad (525–608)
- Durayd ibn al-Simma (d. 630)
- Hassan ibn Thabit (d. c. 674)
- Labīd (560–661)
- Qays ibn al-Mullawah (d. 688)
- al-Tirimmah (died c. 723)

=== Works ===
- Recitation of the Qur'an (approx. 609–632) and compilation of the final version under Uthman (650s?)

== China ==
=== Poets ===
- Luo Binwang (640 – 684), Chinese writer and poet, recognized as of the Four Greats of the Early Tang
- Wang Bo (649 – 676), Tang dynasty poet
- Shen Quanqi (650 – 729), Tang dynasty poet
- He Zhizhang (659 – 744), Chinese poet of the Tang dynasty and one of the Eight Immortals of the Wine Cup
- Chen Zi'ang (661 – 702), Chinese poet of the Tang dynasty
- Shangguan Wan'er (664 – 710), Chinese poet, writer, and politician
- Zhang Jiuling (673 – 740), prominent minister, noted poet and scholar of the Tang dynasty
- Emperor Xuanzong of Tang (685 – 762), emperor and poet
- Meng Haoran (689 or 691 – 740), Chinese poet especially of the landscape, history and legends of Xiangyang
- Wang Changling (698 – 765), Tang dynasty poet

== Japan ==
- Period of introduction of Chinese literature into Japan

=== Poets ===
- Abe no Nakamaro 阿倍仲麻呂 (c. 698 – c. 770) scholar, administrator, and waka poet in the Nara period (surname: Abe)
- Empress Jitō 持統天皇 (645–703; 702 in the lunisolar calendar used in Japan until 1873), 41st imperial ruler, fourth empress and a poet
- Kakinomoto no Hitomaro 柿本 人麻呂 (c. 662–710), late Asuka period poet, nobleman and government official; the most prominent poet in the Man'yōshū anthology
- Princess Nukata 額田王 also known as Princess Nukada (c. 630–690), Asuka period poet
- Ōtomo no Tabito 大伴旅人 (c. 662–731) poet best known as the father of Ōtomo no Yakamochi; both contributed to compiling the Man'yōshū anthology; member of the prestigious Ōtomo clan; served as governor-general of Dazaifu, the military procuracy in northern Kyūshū, from 728 to 730
- Yamanoue no Okura 山上 憶良 (660–733), best known for his poems of children and commoners; has poems in the Man'yōshū anthology

== South Asia ==
=== Poets ===
- Kappe Arabhatta in Kannada
- Bhartrihari (approx.), writing in Sanskrit

== Timeline ==
- 600 – Venantius Fortunatus died about this year (born c. 530), Latin poet and hymnodist from Northern Italy
- 608 – Antarah ibn Shaddad died (born 525), Arabic poet and warrior
- 615 – Saint Columbanus died (born 543), Hiberno-Latin poet and writer
- 625 – Maymun Ibn Qays Al-a'sha died (born 570)
- 630:
  - Durayd ibn al-Simma died
  - Princess Nukata 額田王 also known as Princess Nukada, born about this year (died 690), Asuka period poet
- 640 – al-Akhtal born about this year (died 710)
- 645 – Empress Jitō 持統天皇 born (died 703; 702 in the lunisolar calendar used in Japan until 1873), 41st imperial ruler, fourth empress and a poet
- 657 – Cædmon likely flourishes starting about this year (fl. until c. 680) in Northumbria
- 660:
  - Kuthayyir born about this year (died c. 723)
  - Yamanoue no Okura 山上 憶良 born (died 733), best known for his poems of children and commoners; has poems in the Man'yōshū anthology; Japanese
- 661:
  - Labīd died about this year (born c. 560); Arabic poet
  - Laidcenn mac Buith Bannaig, died; Irish
- 662:
  - Kakinomoto no Hitomaro 柿本 人麻呂 born about this year (died 710), late Asuka period poet, nobleman and government official; the most prominent poet in the Man'yōshū anthology
  - Ōtomo no Tabito 大伴旅人 born about this year (died 732) poet best known as the father of Ōtomo no Yakamochi; both contributed to compiling the Man'yōshū anthology; member of the prestigious Ōtomo clan; served as governor-general of Dazaifu, the military procuracy in northern Kyūshū, from 728 to 730
- 674 – Hassan ibn Thabit died about this year
- 679 – Kumait Ibn Zaid born (died 743)
- 680 – Cædmon, last known to be living about this year (fl. starting 657) in Northumbria
- 688 – Qays ibn al-Mullawah died
- 698 – Abe no Nakamaro 阿倍仲麻呂 born about this year (died c. 770) scholar, administrator, and waka poet in the Nara period (surname: Abe)

== Decades and years ==
590s	590	591	592	593	594	595	596	597	598	599
600s	600	601	602	603	604	605	606	607	608	609
610s	610	611	612	613	614	615	616	617	618	619
620s	620	621	622	623	624	625	626	627	628	629
630s	630	631	632	633	634	635	636	637	638	639
640s	640	641	642	643	644	645	646	647	648	649
650s	650	651	652	653	654	655	656	657	658	659
660s	660	661	662	663	664	665	666	667	668	669
670s	670	671	672	673	674	675	676	677	678	679
680s	680	681	682	683	684	685	686	687	688	689
690s	690	691	692	693	694	695	696	697	698	699
700s	700	701	702	703	704	705	706	707	708	709
