= 6th century in poetry =

== Arabic world ==
Pre-Islamic poetry at its height as the Arabic language emerges as a literary language.

=== Poets ===
- 'Abid ibn al-Abras, (d. 554)
- Samaw'al ibn 'Adiya (d. c. 560)
- 'Alqama ibn 'Abada
- Maymun Ibn Qays Al-a'sha (570–625)
- al-Nabighah al-Dhubyani
- Amr ibn Kulthum ( - c. 584?)
- Antarah ibn Shaddad (525–608)
- Asma bint Marwan
- Harith Ibn Hilliza Ul-Yashkuri (approx.)
- Imru' al-Qais flourished mid-century; purported inventor of the Qasida form
- Ka'b bin Zuhayr flourished during the time of Mohammed, son of Zuhayr
- Labīd (560–661)
- Tarafah ibn al 'Abd
- Zuhayr (520–609), Arabic pre-Islamic poet, father of Ka'b bin Zuhayr

== Europe ==
=== Poets ===
Listed in order by year of birth, if known or estimated:

- Aneirin, a Brythonic Bard, flourishes in Cumbria toward the end of the century
- Arator, of Liguria, writing in Latin
- Sigisteus, Vandal count, patron of Parthenius and a poet himself
- Parthenius, patronized by the Vandal Count Sigisteus
- Jacob of Serugh (451 – Nov. 521), writing in Syriac
- Blossius Aemilius Dracontius (c. 455 – c. 505) of Carthage, a Latin poet
- Magnus Felix Ennodius (474 – July 17, 521), Bishop of Pavia and poet, writing in Latin
- Coluthus of Lycopolis (fl. 491-518), writing in Greek
- Venantius Fortunatus (c. 530 – c. 600), Latin poet and hymnodist from Northern Italy
- Myrddin Wyllt (later 6th century?), semi- (or wholly) legendary Welsh poet and prophet living in Scotland
- Taliesin (c. 534 – c. 599), the earliest definitely identified Welsh poet
- Chilperic I (c. 539 – September 584) Frankish king of Neustria and a Latin poet
- Saint Columbanus (c. 543–615), Hiberno-Latin poet and writer

=== Works ===
- Taliesin (c. 534 – c. 599), whose work has survived in a Middle Welsh manuscript, the Book of Taliesin.
- 544 – Arator declaims his poem De Actibus Apostolorum in the Church of San Pietro-in-Vinculi

== Byzantine Empire ==
=== Poets ===
- Musaeus
- Agathias (c. 536–582/594)
- Paulus Silentiarius (died 575–580),
- Romanos the Melodist (approx.)
- Procopius (c. 500–565)

== South Asia ==
=== Poets ===
- Dandi, writing in Sanskrit (approx.)

== East Asia ==
=== Poets ===
- Su Xiaoxiao (died 501), famous Chinese female singer and poet. Famous for writing the poem of Xhue Cheng.

== Timeline ==
- 500 – Procopius born about this year (died 565)
- 501 Su Xiaoxiao died, famous Chinese Gējì and poet
- 505 – Blossius Aemilius Dracontius died about this year (born 455) of Carthage, a Latin poet
- 520 – Zuhayr born (died 609), Arabic pre-Islamic poet
- 521
  - July 17 – Magnus Felix Ennodius died (born 474 – July 17, 521), Bishop of Pavia and poet, writing in Latin
  - November – Jacob of Serugh died (born 451), writing in Syriac
- 525 – Antarah ibn Shaddad born (died 608) Arabic poet and warrior from Najd
- 530 – Venantius Fortunatus born (c. 530 – c. 600), Latin poet and hymnodist from Northern Italy
- 534 – Taliesin born about this year (died c. 599), the earliest identified Welsh poet
- 536 – Agathias born about this year (died 582/594); Ancient Greek poet and historian
- 539 – Chilperic I born (died September 584) Frankish king of Neustria and a Latin poet
- 543 – Saint Columbanus (died 615), Hiberno-Latin poet and writer
- 544 – Arator declaims his poem De Actibus Apostolorum in the Church of San Pietro-in-Vinculi
- 554 – 'Abid ibn al-Abris died about this year; Arabic poet
- 560:
  - Samaw'al ibn 'Adiya died about this year; Jewish poet writing in Arabic
  - Labīd born this year (died 661); Arabic poet
- 565 – Procopius died (born about 500)
- 570 – Maymun Ibn Qays Al-a'sha born (died 625)
- 584
  - (September) – Chilperic I died (born 539) Frankish king of Neustria and a Latin poet
  - Amr ibn Kulthum died about this year; Arabic poet
- 599 – Taliesin died about this year (born c. 534), the earliest identified Welsh poet

== Decades and years ==
490s	490	491	492	493	494	495	496	497	498	499
500s	500	501	502	503	504	505	506	507	508	509
510s	510	511	512	513	514	515	516	517	518	519
520s	520	521	522	523	524	525	526	527	528	529
530s	530	531	532	533	534	535	536	537	538	539
540s	540	541	542	543	544	545	546	547	548	549
550s	550	551	552	553	554	555	556	557	558	559
560s	560	561	562	563	564	565	566	567	568	569
570s	570	571	572	573	574	575	576	577	578	579
580s	580	581	582	583	584	585	586	587	588	589
590s	590	591	592	593	594	595	596	597	598	599
600s	600	601	602	603	604	605	606	607	608	609
