= 5th century in poetry =

== Roman Empire ==
=== Events ===
- 476: Invasion of Germanic tribes and fall of the Western Roman Empire leads to eclipse of Latin as the European Lingua franca; Germanic and Celtic vernaculars begin process of becoming literary languages.

=== Roman poets ===
- Rutilius Claudius Namatianus flourishes, writing in Latin.
- Sidonius Apollinaris (430–489), in Lugdunum, Gaul, writing in Latin.
- Magnus Felix Ennodius (474 – July 17, 521), Bishop of Pavia and poet, writing in Latin
- Coluthus of Lycopolis (fl. 491–518), writing in Greek.
- Jacob of Serugh (451 – November 521), writing in Syriac
- Blossius Aemilius Dracontius (c. 455 – c. 505), writing in Latin in Carthage

=== Roman works ===
- Blossius Aemilius Dracontius, Satisfactio

== South Asia ==
=== Poets ===
- Probable date of Kālidāsa, Sanskrit poet, author of Meghadūta

=== Works ===
- Cilappatikaram, one of Five Great Epics of Tamil literature.

== China ==
=== Poets ===
- Tao Qian (simplified Chinese: 陶潜; traditional Chinese: 陶潛; pinyin: Táo Qián; Wade–Giles: T'ao Ch'ien), also known as Tao Yuanming (陶淵明) (365–427)
- Xie Lingyun (385–433)
- Bao Zhao (鮑照, also known as Mingyuan (明遠)) (c.414–September 466, executed), poet and official

== Timeline ==
- 427 – Tao Qian simplified Chinese: 陶潜; traditional Chinese: 陶潛; pinyin: Táo Qián; Wade–Giles: T'ao Ch'ien, also known as Tao Yuanming 陶淵明, died (born 365), Chinese poet
- 430 – Sidonius Apollinaris born (died 489), in Lugdunum, Gaul, writing in Latin
- 433 – Xie Lingyun died (born 385), Chinese poet
- 451 – Jacob of Serugh born (died November 521), writing in Syriac
- 455 – Blossius Aemilius Dracontius born about this year (died 505) of Carthage, Latin poet
- 474 – Magnus Felix Ennodius born (died July 17, 521), Bishop of Pavia and Latin poet
- 489 – Sidonius Apollinaris died (born 430), in Lugdunum, Gaul, writing in Latin
- 491 – Coluthus of Lycopolis is known to have lived starting this year (fl. 491–518), writing in Greek-language poet
