= Udhri =

ʿUdhrī may refer to:

- nisba (tribal surname) of the Banū ʿUdhra
- ʿUdhrī love, poetic tradition originating among the Banū ʿUdhra
- al-ʿUdhrī (1003–1085), Andalusi historian
