= Monastery of St. Nicodemus =

Monastery of St. Nicodemus may refer to:

- Monastery of St. Nicodemus (Jerusalem)
- St. Nicodemus and St. Joseph of Arimathea Church, Ramla
- Monastery of Saint Nicodemus on Mount Athos

== See also ==
- Chapel of St. Nicodemus in the Church of the Holy Sepulchre
