= 3rd century in poetry =

== Roman empire ==
=== Poets ===
- Nemesianus (c. 283), Carthage, in Latin
- Oppian of Apamea, Syria, in Greek

== China ==
=== Poets (by date of birth) ===
- Xi Kang (223–262)
- Zhang Hua (232–300)
- Lu Ji (261–303), Kingdom of Wu

=== Works ===
- Zhang Hua, The Admonitions of the Instructress to the Court Ladies (292)

== South Asia ==
- Eelattu Poothanthevanar, writing in Tamil

== Decades and years ==
190s	190	191	192	193	194	195	196	197	198	199
200s	200	201	202	203	204	205	206	207	208	209
210s	210	211	212	213	214	215	216	217	218	219
220s	220	221	222	223	224	225	226	227	228	229
230s	230	231	232	233	234	235	236	237	238	239
240s	240	241	242	243	244	245	246	247	248	249
250s	250	251	252	253	254	255	256	257	258	259
260s	260	261	262	263	264	265	266	267	268	269
270s	270	271	272	273	274	275	276	277	278	279
280s	280	281	282	283	284	285	286	287	288	289
290s	290	291	292	293	294	295	296	297	298	299
300s	300	301	302	303	304	305	306	307	308	309
