= List of Arabic-language writers =

This is a list of Arabic language writers.

== A ==
- Abdelkader Alloula
- Abd al-Jalil al-Tabataba'i
- Ahmed Shawqi
- Abu Tammam
- Abu al-Ala al-Ma'arri
- Abu Hamid al-Ghazali
- Abu al-Faraj al-Isfahani
- Abu al-Qasim al-Shabbi
- Abu Hayyan al-Tawhidi
- Abbas Mahmoud al-Aqqad
- Ahmed Shawqi
- Antarah ibn Shaddad
- Al-Asma'i
- Averroes

== B ==
- Kerolos Bahgat
- Bahiya Bubsit
- Al-Buhturi
- Badi' al-Zaman al-Hamadhani
- Al-Busiri
- Baha al-Din Zuhayr
- Al-Baladhuri
- Ibn Battuta
- Badr Shakir al-Sayyab
- Bint al-Shati

== G ==
- Ghalib Halasa
- Ghassan Kanafani
- Ghada al-Samman
- Al-Ghazali
- Ghaylan ibn 'Uqbah (Dhu al-Rummah)

== I ==
- Abdelghani Ibrahim

== K ==
- Safa Khulusi

== R ==
- Rachid Boudjedra
- Rachid Mimouni

== M ==
- Malek Bennabi

== N ==
- Bhai Nand Lal

== Y ==
- Yasmina Khadra

== See also ==
- List of Arabic-language poets

== Sources ==
- Meisami, Julie Scott; Starkey, Paul, eds. (1998). Encyclopedia of Arabic Literature. Vol. 1. London; New York: Routledge. ISBN 0-415-18571-8.
- Meisami, Julie Scott; Starkey, Paul, eds. (1998). Encyclopedia of Arabic Literature. Vol. 2. London; New York: Routledge. ISBN 0-415-18572-6.
