= Jabal ibn Jawwal =

Jewish poet

Jabal ibn Jawwal (Arabic: جبل بن جوال بن صفوان بن بلال الذبياني الثعلبي اليهودي) was a Jewish poet who wrote in the Arabic language during the 7th century. He was a contemporary of Muhammad.

According to ibn Hisham (Kitab Sirat Rasul Allah, ed. Wüstenfeld, pp. 690, 713) and Abu al-Faraj al-Isfahani ("Kitab al-Aghani," viii. 104), Jabal was a Tha'alabite (Abu al-Faraj gives the whole genealogy), but neither of them mentions the fact that he was a Jew. Ibn Hajar, however, in his biographical dictionary "Kitab al-Ashabah fi Tamyiz al-Shahabah" (ed. Sprenger, i. 453), relying on ibn al-Kalbi and on al-Marzabani, declares that such was the case and that Jabal subsequently embraced Islam. Yaqut ("Mu'jam," i. 765), quoting a verse of Jabal, calls him erroneously "Jamal ibn Jawwal al-Taghlabi."

Jabal is sporadically cited by the above-mentioned Arabic authors. Abu al-Faraj (l.c. p. 101) quotes two verses of Jabal's, apparently from a poem which he addressed to al-Shammakh, himself a Tha'alabite poet, in reference to a quarrel that arose between them. This is probably the same incident as that related by Abu al-Faraj (l.c. p. 104); namely, that al-Shammakh fell in love with Jabal's sister Kalbah, and when, shortly afterward, al-Shammakh went on a journey she married his brother, giving rise to a poetical contest between the disappointed lover and Jabal. Eleven other verses by Jabal, indicating sufficiently the poet's Jewish religion, are quoted by ibn Hisham (l.c. p. 713). They are an elegy on the death of Huyayy ibn Akhtab (according to Sprenger's punctuation in ibn Hajar, l.c., "Jubayy"), chief of the Banu al-Nadir, and on the defeat by Muhammad of this tribe and of the Banu Qurayza. These verses were a reply to the poet Hassan ibn Thabit. They apparently do not form a complete poem; for ibn Hajar (l.c.) quotes a verse of Jabal's not appearing in the quotation of Ibn Hisham, but having the same meter and the same rhyme, and therefore probably from the same poem.

== See also ==
- Abu 'Afak
- Ka'b ibn al-Ashraf

== Resources ==
Gottheil, Richard and M. Seligsohn. "Jabal ibn Jawwal". Jewish Encyclopedia. Funk and Wagnalls, 1901–1906.
