= Herod's Gate =

Gate of the Old City of Jerusalem

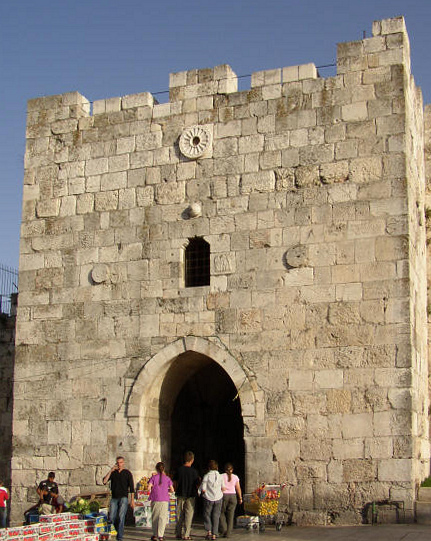
- Herod's Gate

- Location within Old City of Jerusalem

General information
- Location: Jerusalem
- Coordinates: 31°46′58.8″N 35°14′1.5″E

Herod's Gate (Arabic: باب الزاهرة, Bab az-Zahra, Hebrew: שער הפרחים, romanized: Sha'ar HaPrakhim, lit. 'Flowers Gate') is one of the seven open Gates of the Old City of Jerusalem. It connects the Muslim Quarter inside of the old city to the eponymic Palestinian neighbourhood of Bab az-Zahra, situated just outside. It is a short distance to the east of the Damascus Gate. Its elevation is 755 meters above sea level.

== Names ==
Herod's Gate is the Christian name of the gate from the 16th or 17th century. In Luke 23 (Luke 23:7), Jesus is sent by Pontius Pilate to the tetrarch Herod Antipas, and a Christian tradition associated a somewhat-nearby house near the Church of the Flagellation with Herod Antipas's palace. Yet another tradition claimed that the nearby Church of St Nicodemus (Deir al-ʿAdas) was Herod Antipas's house.

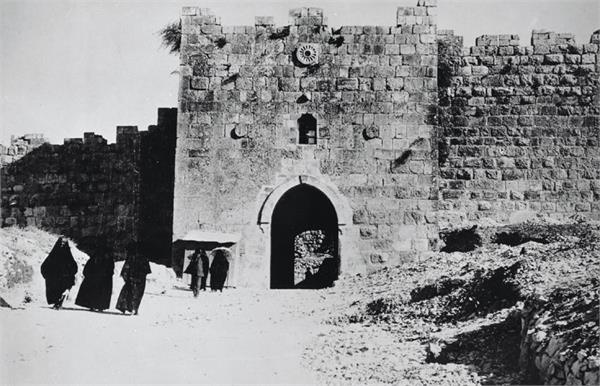
Flowers Gate, 1905

Bāb az-Zāhra is the Arab Muslim name of the gate. In proximity to the gate is an Arab neighborhood called Bab az-Zahra. Az-Zahra is a corruption of the name as-Sāhira, given to the hill and the cemetery across the road, where people are buried who have performed the pilgrimage to Mecca. Sura 79; 6-14 of the Koran speaks of the Day of Resurrection using the phrase "they shall return to the earth's surface (as-sāhira)", and an old tradition interprets this term as the proper name of a concrete valley or plain, identified at least since the 11th century as the nearby Kidron Valley. The other meaning of sahira, taken as a verb, is "to be watchful" and would indicate how the newly resurrected would look around waiting for the events to follow. The name Sahira, once corrupted to "Zahra" – sometimes rendered as "Zahara" and on maps from the late 19th-early 20th century as "Zahira(h)" – became very similar to an Arabic word for 'flower' or 'blossom', zahra.

Sha'ar HaPrakhim ('Flowers Gate') is the Hebrew name of the gate. Interpreted as a translation of the Arabic Bāb az-Zāhra, explained above, it would seem to be a misnomer. However, the popular etymology of the Hebrew name connects it to the stone rosette which decorates the gate tower.

== History ==
Formerly, the sprawling residential area within this gate was known as Bezetha (effectually translated as "New City"), settled during the late Second Temple period to accommodate Jerusalem's growing population.

This modest gate, which opens from a wall tower, is one of the newest gates of Jerusalem. At the time when Suleiman the Magnificent built the city walls in the 1530s, a small wicket gate was situated in the eastern, lateral wall of the tower, which was rarely opened. By 1875, in order to provide a passageway to the new neighborhoods which were beginning to develop north of the Old City, the Ottomans opened a new gate in the northern, frontal wall of the tower, which faces the Sultan Suleiman Street and offers easier access, and closed the original lateral gate.

In 1998 and during several subsequent excavation seasons (the latest in 2004), archaeologists of the Israel Antiquities Authority dug in the eastern area of Herod's Gate. The digging focused on three separate areas adjacent to the wall, in which nine archaeological layers were discovered – covering from the Iron Age up through the Ottoman period. Among the most significant discoveries were structures from the period of the Second Temple, a complete segment of the Byzantine-Roman wall, and remnants of massive construction underneath the wall. These remnants were identified as portions of a fortification from the ancient Muslim period and from the Middle Ages. These discoveries point out the importance which the rulers of the city gave to the fortification of one of its most sensitive places—the northern wall of Jerusalem. Indeed, historical accounts indicate that in 1099 the Crusader army under Godfrey of Bouillon entered the city through a breach located slightly east of the present Herod's Gate.

== See also ==
- Gates of the Old City of Jerusalem
- Bezetha
- Zedekiah's Cave
- Walls of Jerusalem
