= ʿUdhrī love =

ʿUdhrī love (Arabic: الحب العذري, romanized: al-ḥubb al-ʿuḏrī) is a theme in classical Arabic literature. It is the strong desire for and devotion to an uttainable beloved that lasts until and beyond death. Theʿudhrī poet–lover is often depicted as a martyr of love.

ʿUdhrī love is associated with and named for the love poets of the ʿUdhra tribe during the Umayyad period. In the succeeding Abbasid period, these poets were the subject a legendary biographical tradition. ʿUdhrī love has usually been depicted as a chaste love, which has sometimes been equated with Platonic love. In the legendary treatment of the poets, it bears some resemblance to later European traditions of courtly love. The Bedouin origin of ʿudhrī love is often contrasted with the urban roots of other traditions.

Al-ghazal al-ʿudhrī—the ʿudhrī tradition of ghazal (love poetry)—begins with ʿUrwa ibn Ḥizām, who died around 650. Only a few of his verses are preserved. A complete dīwān (anthology) of the poetry of Jamīl ibn Maʿmar survives from the following decades. He is the leading ʿudhrī poet and, like ʿUrwa, was a member of the tribe. Not all the ʿudhrī were of the tribe. Kuthayyir ibn ʿAbd al-Raḥmān, who was the rāwī (transmitter) of Jamīl, was a poet in his own right. The historicity of Majnūn Laylā and Qays ibn Dharīḥ is disputed. The boundaries of the ʿudhrī tradition are also disputed. Dhū al-Rumma and al-ʿAbbās ibn al-Aḥnaf are sometimes included, although the latter also wrote erotic poetry.

Although ʿudhrī love is unconsummated, it is not purely spiritual. Jamīl writes, "I wish we could live together, and when we die, my grave would be beside her grave among the dead". The beloved's body is often described in detail. A verse attributed to Majnūn describes his beloved's mouth: "As if her mouth is full of the essence of carnation, and musk; early morning clouds’ raindrops are in her mouth".

References to ʿudhrī love appear in European literature in the 19th century, beginning with Stendhal's De l'amour (1822), which mentions the "Benou-Azra" (Banū ʿUdhra) who die of love. The poem Der Asra by Heinrich Heine is on the same theme.

== See also ==
- Ishq

== Bibliography ==
- Alharthi, Jokha (2021). The Body in Arabic Love Poetry: The 'Udhri Tradition. Edinburgh University Press.
- Jacobi, Renate (2000). "ʿudhrī". In Bearman, P. J.; Bianquis, Th.; Bosworth, C. E.; van Donzel, E. & Heinrichs, W. P. (eds.). The Encyclopaedia of Islam, Second Edition. Volume X: T–U. Leiden: E. J. Brill. pp. 774–777. ISBN 978-90-04-11211-7.
