= Fawzi Maalouf =

Brazilian poet and writer (1899–1930)

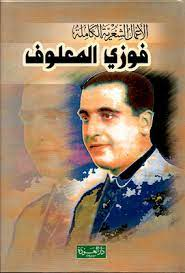
- Portrait of Fawzi Maalouf on one of his poetry compilations
- Born: 21 May 1899; Zahlé, Beqaa Governorate of Lebanon
- Died: 14 November 1930 (31 years old); Rio de Janeiro, Brazil
- Education: Collège des Frères Maristes Champville

Fawzi Maalouf (1899–1930) also spelled as Fauzi Maluf, Fawzi al-Ma'luf or simply Fawzi Maluf was a Brazilian poet and writer of Lebanese descent. Born to an Arab Christian family living in Zahlé, Maalouf emigrated to Brazil in 1921 where he stayed until his death. He is the founder of the Andalusian League movement.

== Biography ==
Fawzi Maalouf was born on 21 May 1899 to the Maalouf family of Arab Christians. He studied at the Collège des Frères Maristes Champville in Lebanon. Later at the age of 14, Maalouf started writing poetry and also wrote a successful play at the age of 16. He emigrated to Brazil in 1921 and settled in the city of Rio de Janeiro with his uncle and brother. Maalouf's writing and career peaked during his stay in Brazil, where he became more popular.

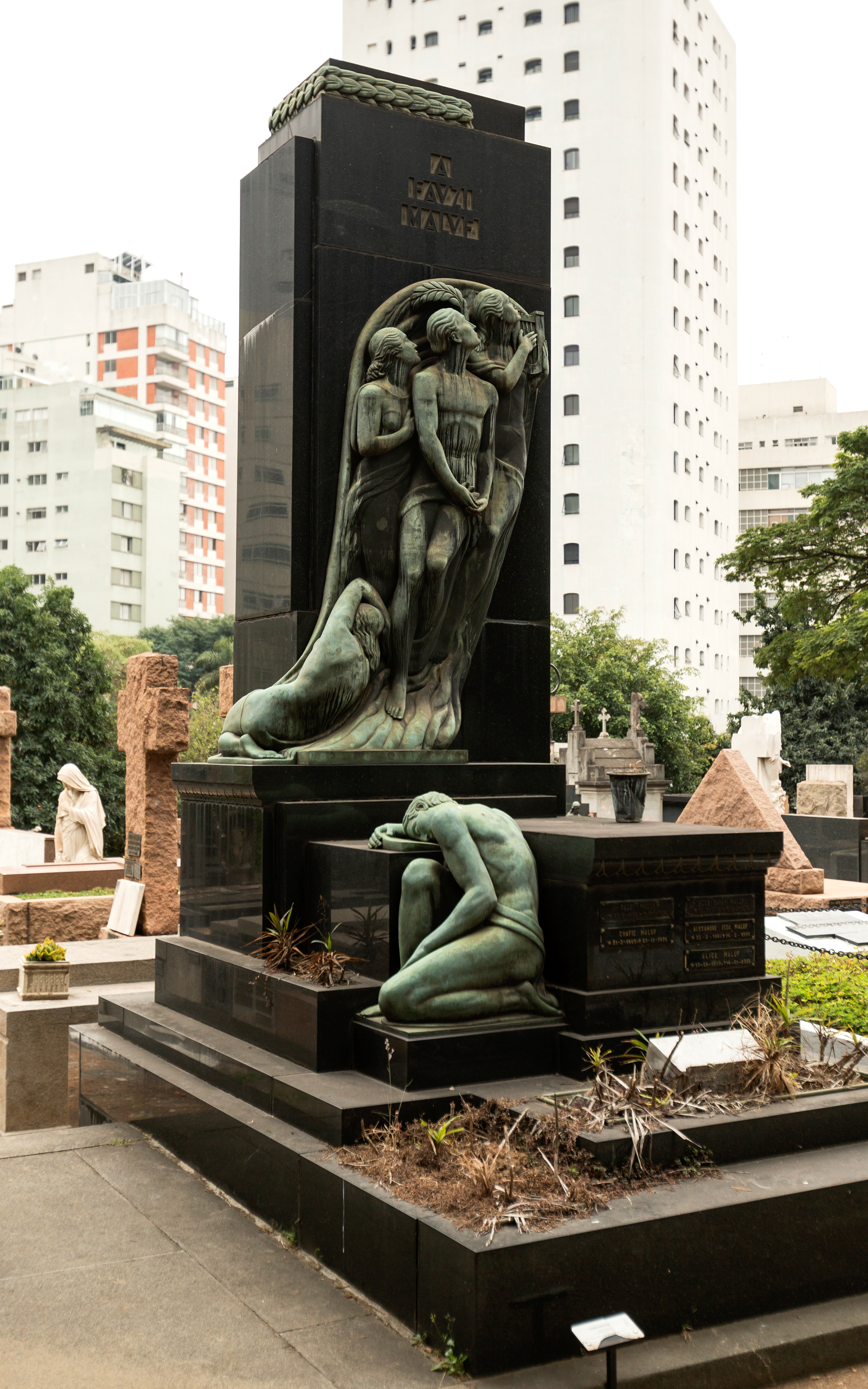
The Maalouf family tomb in the Cemitério da Consolação, São Paulo

Maalouf died during a surgery in 1930. He was buried in the Cemitério da Consolação in São Paulo.

== Legacy ==
Fawzi Maalouf founded a literary movement known as The Andalusian League. He was also a representative of the Mahjar literary movement. Maalouf's poem Ala bisat ar-Rih, written in 1926, is one of his more famous works and has been translated into other languages for a worldwide audience. Another of his famous poetry is done in memoir of the Emirate of Granada and its fall after Muhammad XII surrendered its keys and ownership to the Castillians.

== See also ==
- List of Arabic-language poets
