= Faustino Arévalo =

Spanish Jesuit hymnographer and patrologist

- Born: July 29, 1747; Campanario, Badajoz, Spain
- Died: January 7, 1824 (aged 76); Madrid, Spain
- Occupation(s): Hymnographer, patrologist, Jesuit priest
- Notable work: Hymnodia Hispanica

Faustino Arévalo (23 July 1747 at Campanario, Badajoz in Extremadura, Spain – 7 January 1824 at Madrid) was a Spanish Jesuit hymnographer and patrologist.

He entered the Society of Jesus in 1761, but was deported to Italy on the occasion of the deportation of the Jesuits from Spain (1767). There he won the esteem and confidence of Francisco Antonio de Lorenzana, who proved a patron for the young Spanish Jesuit, bore the expenses of his academic work, and made him his executor.

Arévalo held various offices of trust in Rome, among them that of "pontifical hymnographer". He was made theologian of the Apostolic Penitentiary in 1809, in succession to Alfonso Muzzarelli. In 1815 he returned to Spain, recalled by King Ferdinand, entered the restored Society, and became provincial of Castile (1820). Arévalo stands in the front rank of Spanish patristic scholars.

== Works ==
His principal works are:

- Hymnodia Hispanica (Rome, 1786), a restoration of ancient Spanish hymns to their original metrical, musical, and grammatical perfection. This work was much esteemed by Angelo Mai and Prosper Guéranger. Among the dissertations that accompany the main work is a curious one on the breviary of Cardinal Francisco de Quiñones.
- Prudentii Carmina (Rome, 1788–89, 2 Vol., quarto).
- Dracontii Carmina (Rome, 1791), the poems of a fifth-century Christian of Roman Africa.
- Juvenci Historiae Evangelicae Libri IV (Rome, 1794).
- Caelii Sedulii Opera Omnia (Rome, 1813).
- S. Isidori Hispaniensis Opera Omnia (Rome, 1813).
- Missale Gothicum (Rome, 1804).
