= Jamil ibn Ma'mar =

Arab poet

- جميل بن عبد الله بن معمر العذري
- Born: Jamīl ibn 'Abd Allāh ibn Ma'mar al-'Udhrī
- Died: 701 CE
- Occupation: Poet
- Writing career
- Language: Arabic
- Period: 7th century
- Genre: Love poetry

Jamīl ibn 'Abd Allāh ibn Ma'mar al-'Udhrī (Arabic: جميل بن عبد الله بن معمر العذري; d.701 CE), also known as Jamil Buthayna, was a classical Arabic love poet. He belonged to the Banu 'Udhra tribe which was renowned for its poetic tradition of chaste love.

== See also ==
- Kuthayyir
