= Abd al-Jalil al-Tabataba'i =

Iraqi writer and poet

Sayyid ʿAbd al-Jalīl al-Ṭabaṭabāʾī
- Born: 1775; Basra, Iraq
- Died: 1853 (aged 77–78); Baghdad, Iraq
- Occupations: Poet, writer
- Notable work: Rawḍ al-khill wa-al-Khalīl

Sayyid ʿAbd al-Jalīl al-Ṭabaṭabāʾī (1775–1853) was a poet and writer from Basra, Iraq.

== Biography ==
Sayyid 'Abd al-Jalil ibn Yasin was born in 1775 in Basra, Iraq. As indicated by his epithet, al-Ṭabaṭabāʾī, he came from the family of Tabataba'i, a prestigious Shi'ite family that had produced influential scholars such as Mohammed Kazem Yazdi and Allameh Muhammad Husayn. He spent most of his early life in the city of Basra, and later moved to Zubarah in his adulthood. There, he studied the Islamic religion under a Hanbali scholar, Muhammad ibn Fayruz, who later gave him the authority to transmit hadith in 1769. However, Al-Tabataba'i would eventually leave Zubarah in 1810 after the armies of the First Saudi State invaded Zubarah. He would instead emigrate to the Emirate of Kuwait, where he continued his poetry and writing. He also wrote a poem in praise of the Hanbali jurist Muhammad ibn Abd al-Wahhab, the founder of the Wahhabi movement and a controversial figure that was excommunicated by the contemporary Grand Mufti of Mecca, although he later also wrote poetry in praise of Sufi orders such as the Rifa'iyya, which he was a member of.

Al-Tabataba'i died in 1853. He was succeeded by a son, Ahmad, a muhaddith who wrote a commentary on the al-Arbaʿīn al-Nawawiyyah. His descendants, who are mostly Sunni with a sizable non-denominational group, currently live in modern day Saudi Arabia as well as Sunni-dominated areas of Iraq and Kuwait.

== Works ==
The only surviving work of Al-Tabataba'i is his compilation of poems, titled the Rawḍ al-khill wa-al-Khalīl. Written during his lifetime in Kuwait, it contains over two hundred poems.

== See also ==
- List of Arabic-language poets
- List of Arabic-language writers
