= Masoud Juni =

Syrian poet and writer

Masoud Juni مسعود جوني
- Born: 1938; Mashqita, Mandatory Syrian Republic
- Died: 16 May, 1991 (53 years old); Mashqita, Syria
- Citizenship: Syrian
- Education: Egyptian Military Academy; University of Damascus
- Occupations: Writer, novelist, poet
- Writing career
- Language: Arabic
- Years active: 1968-1991
- Genre: Poetry
- Notable work: A Basalt House

Masoud Juni, sometimes spelled as Masoud Jouni (Arabic: مسعود جوني; 1939-16 May 1991), was a Syrian writer, poet and novelist from Mashqita, Latakia known for his sentimental poems about love and nationalism.

== Early life, education and early jobs ==
Juni was born in 1939 in the village of Mashqita, Latakia during the period of the French Mandate for Syria and the Lebanon.

After completing high school, Juni traveled to and resided in Egypt in 1957 where he earned a Bachelor's degree from the Egyptian Military Academy two years later in 1959 and later returned to Syria to study Law in the University of Damascus. Sometime after graduating, he became an officer in the Syrian Arab Army before being transferred to the Syrian Civil Defence Forces which he became the director of in Latakia and Tartous.

== Career ==
He began writing in the 60s and joined the Arab Writers Union in Syria, rising to become one of its prominent members and later becoming the president of its branch in Latakia. His first published work was Songs for Love and People which he published in Damascus in 1968, a poetry book that, like most of his works, contains nationalist, sentimental and romantic poems. He would later continue to publish four more publications in Damascus, three books of poetry and a novel from 1971 to 1991.

He says in his poem "Your eyes are Poetry":

You're just like poetic visions

Of the Harvest Season in the month of April

Your eyes are poetry, I dare not say a poem

I see a thousand titles on your eyelids and lashes

== Death ==
He died on Thursday 16 May 1991 at the age of 53, leaving behind three unpublished manuscripts, a novel, A House of Basalt, the second volume of The Dual Says and a novel talking about political life and society in the 1960s. The first two books would be published in Damascus in 1992 and 1994 respectively, while the third unnamed novel remains unreleased to this day.

Fellow Syrian writer Dr. Masoud Bobou wrote in an article mourning him after his death:

Now another warm voice closes the window and departs.. Embarks on his horse and releases it in fields of wheat tinged with the colors of dawn and twilight, as alone as a lush moon behind the clouds, allowing the incense to penetrate into the balconies of the houses and temples. [..] Rest in peace, my friend..

== Publications ==
- Songs for Love and People أغنيات للحب والشعب Poetry. Damascus 1968
- Flame and Shadow اللهب والظل Poetry. Damascus 1971
- Two Steps Between You and I بيني وبينك خطوتان Poetry. Damascus 1984
- The Dual Says يقول المثنى Poetry. Damascus 1991
- Proclamation Number 9 البلاغ رقم 9 Novel. Damascus 1991
- A Basalt House بيت من البازلت Novel. Damascus 1992
- The Dual Says يقول المثنى Poetry. Damascus 1994

== See also ==
- Arab Writers Union
- List of Arabic-language poets
