= Ibn Munadhir =

Abbasid-era Arab poet

Ibn Munād̲h̲ir
- ابن مناذر
- Born: Unknown, possibly c. 7th century CE; Aden, Yemen
- Died: c. 813 or 814 CE
- Known for: Arabic poetry

Ibn Munād̲h̲ir (Arabic: ابن مناذر), full name Muhammad ibn Munadhir as-Subiri al-Yarbu'i (died 813 or 814) was an Arab poet from the Abbasid period. A pioneer of Arabic poetry, he lived contemporary to the rule of the Abbasid caliphs, al-Mansur until al-Amin.

== Biography ==
=== Early life ===
Born in the city of Aden in Yemen, Muhammad ibn Munadhir as-Subiri al-Yarbu'i was born on an unknown date of birth. He moved to Basra in his teenage years where he was educated in matters of religion and language; afterwards he eventually made a living out of being a poet, writing eloquent poetry which praised and satisfied the rulers which included the caliphs al-Mansur and Harun al-Rashid. He also praised government officials such as the Barmakids. Ibn Munadhir also became a religious teacher and a Muslim scholar; teaching classes at a mosque in Basra as well as engaging in debates with other scholars.

=== Scandal ===
Ibn Munadhir became subject to controversy after he had fallen in love with a young man named 'Abd al-Hamid. He would write poetry about 'Abd al-Hamid constantly, much to the irritation and frustration of the public. This worsened after 'Abd al-Hamid died in a freak accident; Ibn Munadhir became very distraught from this. Soon, the public knew of his exploits; they boycotted him socially and also distanced themselves from him.

=== Life in Mecca and death ===
The controversy behind Ibn Munadhir soon had become so widespread, he was forced to leave Basra. He migrated to Mecca (now part of present-day Saudi Arabia) and began secluding himself in the city's main mosque. Arab historians record that he died in either the year 198 or 199 of the Hijri calendar.

== Poetry ==
Ibn Munadhir's style of poetry was quite similar to the poetry of pre-Islamic Arabia. The poems he wrote dealt with themes like love, praise, satire as well as elegies. He also wrote poetry about 'Abd al-Hamid, the man whom he fell in love with.

=== Elegy ===
Ibn Munadhir is well known for his praise-filled elegy dedicated to his deceased best friend, 'Abd al-Majid.

== Criticism ==
According to the Hadith scholar and traditionist Yahya ibn Ma'in, Ibn Munadhir would indulge in strange rituals during his seclusion in Mecca. He gave two examples, which were; that Ibn Munadhir would release desert scorpions into the prayer halls of the Sacred Mosque, as well as pour ink into the ablution fountains for his personal amusement. However, Yahya ibn Ma'in did not mention anything about Ibn Munadhir's supposed homosexuality.

== See also ==
- List of Arabic-language poets
