= Bab az-Zahra =

Neighborhood in East Jerusalem

Coordinates: 31°47′14″N 35°13′54″E

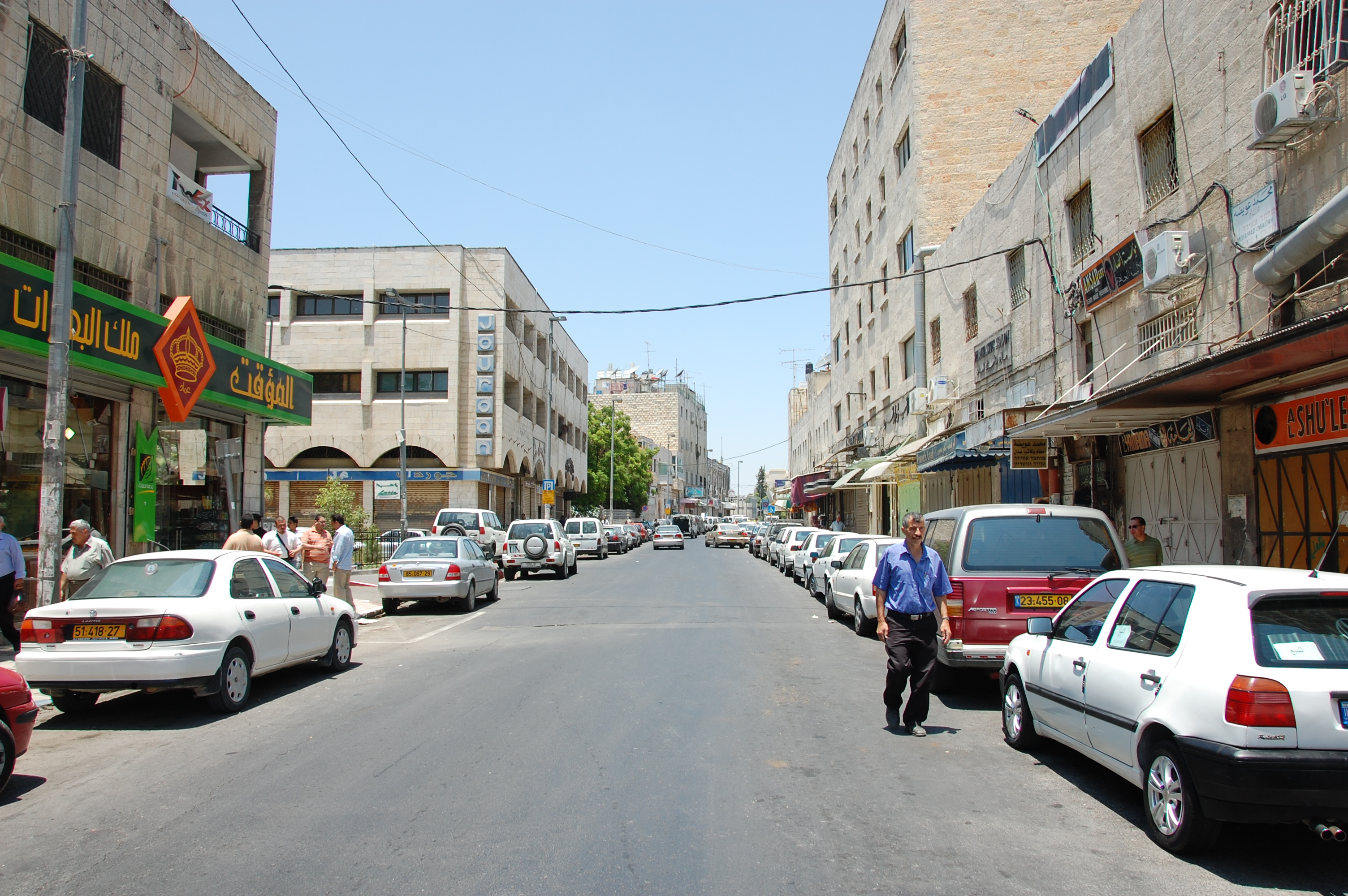
Saladin Street in Bab az-Zahra

Bab az-Zahra (Arabic: باب الزاهرة, romanized: Bāb az-Zāhra) is an Arab neighborhood in East Jerusalem, north of the Old City. It is bordered by the American Colony to the north, Wadi al-Joz to the east, Herod's Gate and Damascus Gate on its south, and Mas'udiyyah and Mea Shearim to the west. Herod's Gate, which is called Bab az-Zahra in Arabic, lent its name to this neighborhood.

== History ==
At the end of the Roman Period, the building of the so-called Third Wall of Jerusalem, started under the reign of Herod Agrippa I (r. 41-44 CE), finished by the rebels around 66 CE and destroyed by the Romans at the end of the First Jewish–Roman War in 70 CE, meant that the area was included for a short while behind the protective walls of the city.

The modern neighborhood was founded at the end of the 19th century along the road to Nablus in the proximity of The Garden Tomb, and was one of the first Arab neighborhoods built outside the Old City walls.

First during the British Mandate in Palestine, and then even more so under Jordanian rule after the partition of Jerusalem in 1948, the neighborhood became a commercial center of East Jerusalem.

== Features ==
The main thoroughfares of the neighborhood, Nablus Road, Saladin Street (Salah ad-Din Street), az-Zahra Street and surrounding streets are major commercial centers. Branches of the main banks and restaurants have offices there. The commercial area continues uninterrupted through Damascus Gate with the open market in the Muslim Quarter of the Old City. In the eastern part of the neighborhood resides the Rockefeller Archeological Museum, which was opened in 1937. Also on Saladin Street are the district court, the judiciary office, and the legal counsel for the government. Another famous building in this neighborhood is the Orient House.
