= Laidcenn mac Buith Bannaig =

Laidcenn mac Buith Bannaig or Laidcend mac Baíth Bandaig (died 661) was a monastic scholar at Cluain Ferta Mo-Lua (Clonfert-Mulloe, Co. Laois) in northern Osraige. The name is also sometimes spelled "Lathcen."

He is the ascribed author of the earliest surviving example of a lorica or breastplate, a term applied to a genre of charm-prayers, derived from the Pauline conception of life as an armed struggle. In this work, protection is asked for all 70-odd body parts by invoking the heavenly powers. The best known lorica is St. Patrick's Breastplate, which, however, has no connection to the saint.

Laidcend is also known for having produced the Ecloga de Moralibus, an epitome of Gregory the Great's Moralia in Job. Ten medieval manuscripts of the work are known.

== Sources ==
- Welsh, Robert. Oxford Concise Companion to Irish Literature. 1996. ISBN 0-19-280080-9
- Castaldi, Lucia. "Lathcen." In P. Chiesa and L. Castaldi (eds.), La Trasmissione dei testi latini del medioevo. Medieval Latin Texts and their Transmission. Te.Tra. 4 (Florence: SISMEL 2012), 374–387.
