= Samaw'al ibn 'Adiya =

6th-century Arabian poet who converted to Judaism

- Born: Early 6th century Tayma, Northern Arabia
- Died: c. 560
- Occupations: Poet, Warrior
- Relatives: Safiyya bint Huyayy (maternal granddaughter)
- Writing career
- Language: Arabic

As-Samaw’al bin ‘Ādiyā’ (Arabic: السموأل بن عادياء بن رفاعة بن الحارث بن كعب / Hebrew: שמואל בן עדיה) was a pre-Islamic Arabian poet and warrior, esteemed by the Arabs for his loyalty, which was commemorated by an Arabic idiom: "more loyal than al-Samaw'al". (Note: أوفى من السموأل awfá min as-Samaw’al)

He lived in the first half of the 6th century. His clan converted to Judaism when they were in Southern Arabia. Later, they moved to northern Arabia, settling in Taima, where al-Samw'al was born and lived most of his life.

He was the maternal grandfather of Safiyya bint Huyayy, one of prophet Mohammed's wives.

== Background ==
His full name is disputed among Arab scholars. His name is said to be al-Samaw'al Bin 'Adiya or al-Samaw'al Bin 'Arid Bin 'Adiya or al-Samaw'al Bin Awfa or al-Samaw'al Bin Hayyan or al-Samaw'al Bin Hayya. Ibn Durayd said that he was son of a priest called Haroun Ibn 'Amran and that he was from the tribe of Banu Ghassan. While al-Jawaliqi said his mother was from Banu Ghassan and his father was from al-Azd.

He was one of the most famous poets of his time thanks to the famous poem that he wrote after a princess tried to degrade his people since they were few in number. In this poem, he brags about the history of his clan, Banu Alrayan, and how they ascended to the lordship of their tribe. Before moving out of Yemen, his clan were the kings in Najran, located in modern day Saudi Arabia, and at one point they had supremacy over Yemen before some of them, including the poet's father, converted to Judaism and moved to northern Arabia. In this poem, al-Samaw'al also trace his genealogy to Banu Aldayan. Al-Samuel owned a castle near Taima (eight hours north of Medina), built by his grandfather 'Adiya and called, from its mixed color, al-Ablaq. It was situated on a high hill and was a stopping-place for travelers to and from Syria.

== Fidelity ==
More than for his poetic talents al-Samaw'al is famous for his connection with the warrior-poet and prince Imru' al-Qais, which won for him the epithet "faithful," and gave rise to the Arabic saying "more faithful than al-Samaw'al." This came about in the following manner: Amru al-Qais, being abandoned by his followers in his fight with the Banu Asad to avenge the death of his father, and being pursued by Al-Nu'man Ibn al-Mundhir Ibn Ma' al-Sama', wandered about from tribe to tribe seeking protection as well as support in his endeavor to regain his inheritance. When he came to the Banu Fazara their chief advised him to seek out Samaw'al ibn 'Adiya' in his castle al-Ablaq, saying that although he had seen the Emperor of the Greeks and visited the Lakhmid kingdom of al-Hirah, he had never found a place better fitted for assuring safety to those in need, nor known a more faithful protector than its owner. Amru al-Qais, who was accompanied by his daughter Hind, and his cousin, and had with him five suits of chainmail besides other weapons, immediately set out for the castle, and on the way he and his guide composed a poem in praise of their prospective host. Samaw'al received the poet hospitably, erected a tent of skins for Hind, and received the men into his own hall. After they had been there "as long as God willed," Amru al-Qais, wishing to secure the assistance of the emperor Justinian I, asked Samaw'al to give him a letter to the Ghassanid prince Harith ibn Abi Shamir, who might further him on his way. The poet then departed, leaving Hind, his cousin, and his armor in Samaw'al's keeping, and he never came to reclaim them. According to Arabian tradition, while on his homeward journey from Constantinople, he was poisoned by order of Justinian, who had listened to treacherous accusations against him.

After Amru al-Qais had left Al-Ablaq, Prince al-Munthir—it is not known whether before or after Amru's death—sent Harith to Samaw'al ordering him to deliver up the articles deposited with him. Samaw'al refusing to do so, Harith laid siege to the castle. The besiegers met with no success until one day Harith captured Samaw'al's son, who, according to the story in the Kitab al-Aghani, was returning from the chase. Harith then called upon the father to choose between giving up the property and witnessing his son's death. Samaw'al answered that his son had brothers, but that his honor once lost could not be recovered. Harith at once struck off the boy's head before the unhappy father's eyes and then withdrew, perceiving that he could accomplish nothing in the face of such steadfastness. There are a few verses handed down by different Arabian writers in which Samaw'al ibn 'Adiya refers to this deed.

A description of the castle al-Ablaq is given by the poet A'sha (Yaqut, i.96), who confuses it with Solomon's Temple. It is related of this poet that, being captured together with other Arabs, he was taken as a prisoner to the castle at Taima, at that time belonging to Samaw'al's son Shuraih ibn Samaw'al, without his captor's knowing that he was in the company. Waiting until Shuraih was within hearing, A'sha began to recite a poem extolling the deed of his father, and calling on the son to emulate his example by rescuing him (A'sha). Shuraih procured the poet's release, and allowed him to depart, first presenting him with a swift camel. Shuraih himself, his brother Jarid, and Samaw'al's grandson Sa'ba were all poets.

== Sources ==
- Jacobs, Joseph et al. "Samuel bin 'Adiya." Jewish Encyclopedia. Funk and Wagnalls, 1901–1906, citing:

- Caussin de Perceval, Essai sur l'histoire des Arabes avant l'Islamisme, ii. 319 et seq., Paris, 1847
- Franz Delitzsch, Jüdisch-Arabische Poesien aus Vormuhammedischer Zeit, Leipsic, 1874
- Grätz, Gesch. 3d ed., v. 83-86
- Ḥamasa, ed. Freytag, pp. 49 et seq.
- Kitab al-Aghani, Index
- Giorgio Levi Della Vida, "A proposito di as-Samawʾal", Rassegna degli Studi Orientali, XIII (1931), pp. 53-72.
- Nöldeke, Beiträge zur Kenntniss der Poesie der Alten Araber, pp. 57-72, Hanover, 1864
- Rasmusen, Additamenta ad Historiam Arabum (from Ibn Nubata), p. 14;
- R. E. J. vii. 176
- Baron MacGuckin de Slane, Diwan des Amru'l Kais, Introduction.J. M. W. M.
