= Monastery of St. Nicodemus (Jerusalem) =

Greek Orthodox monastery in Jerusalem

St. Nicodemus Monastery Dayr al-ʿAdas
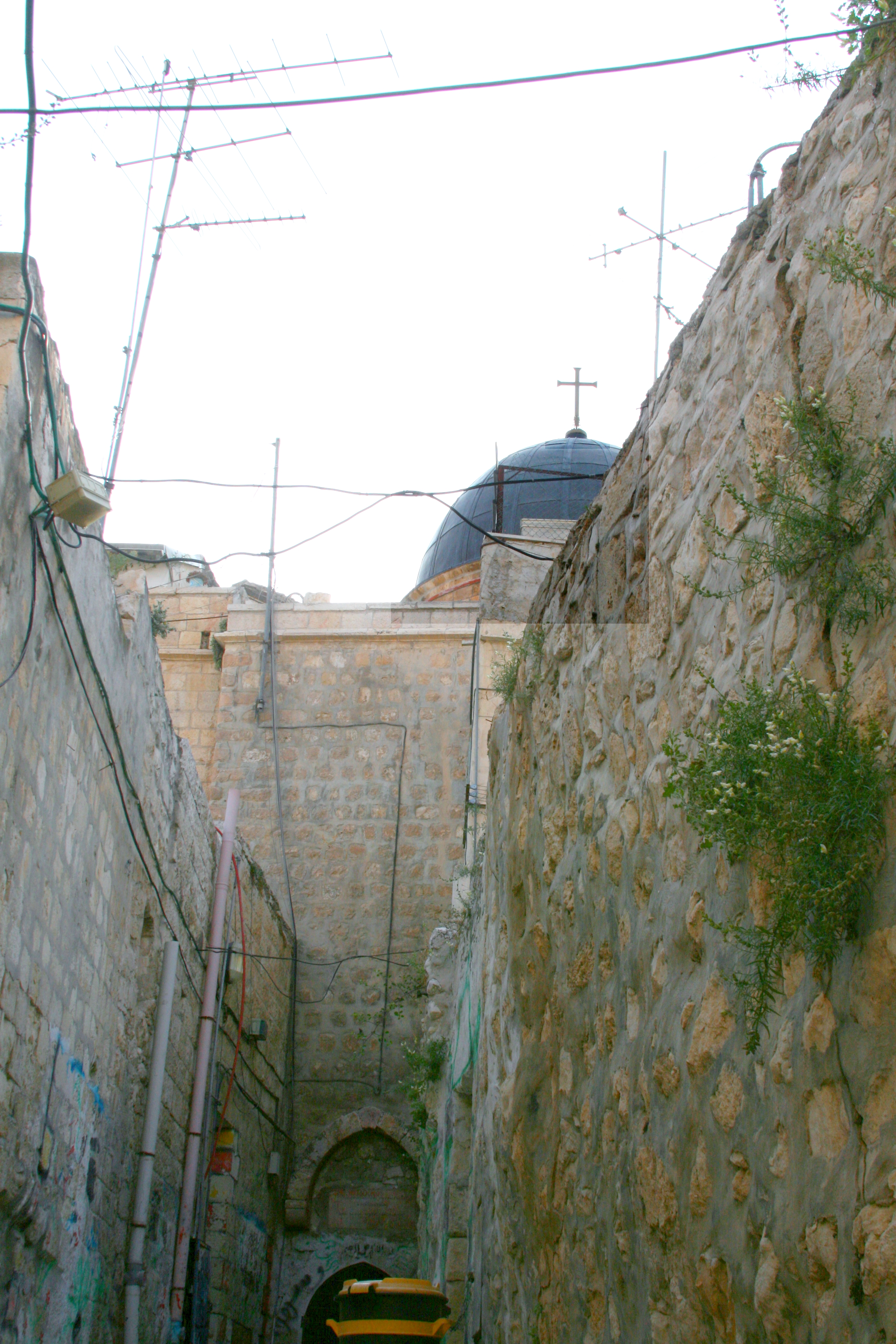
- Interactive map of St. Nicodemus Monastery; Dayr al-ʿAdas

Monastery information
- Other names: *(formerly) St. Elias; *Deir el-Adass, 'Monastery of the Lentils'
- Denomination: Greek Orthodox (formerly: Latin (Roman Catholic), then Syriac Orthodox and Muslim)

Site
- Location: Old City, Jerusalem
- Coordinates: 31.780939°N 35.234405°E

The Monastery of St. Nicodemus, known in Arabic as Deir el-Adass, 'Monastery of the Lentils', is a small monastery under the jurisdiction of the Greek Orthodox Patriarchate of Jerusalem dedicated to Nicodemus. It is located in Jerusalem's Muslim Quarter, south of Herod's Gate and 90 metres north of the Via Dolorosa.

According to Orthodox belief, Saint Peter was held in the cellar of this building after being jailed by Herod Agrippa and then freed by an angel.

== Names ==
The church was known as Saint Elias (Sanct Helye) by the Crusaders in the 12th and/or 13th century.

Its common name in Arabic, Dair al-ʿAdas, also spelled Deir el-Adass (Dayr al-ʿAdas, دير العدس "Monastery of Lentils"), dates to the 16th century or earlier. An Orthodox tradition says it is because lentils were cooked there, using the Cauldron of Saint Helen, to feed to the builders of the Church of the Resurrection (Church of the Holy Sepulchre) or that St. Helen fed crowds lentils there during a famine. Carl Sandreczki suggested in 1865 that it might have once been used as a soup-house, shūrbā khāna.

A pseudo-etymological interpretation is that Dayr al-ʿAdas is a phonetic distortion of Herod Antipas, and a 19th-century assumption was that Herod Antipas's house had stood there.

The church was renamed after Saint Nicodemus once the building, used for some time for storage and dwelling, was restored and rededicated by the Greek Orthodox sometime between 1895 and 1908. The current explanation given by the Greek Orthodox Church is that it was Simon the Pharisee's house and that Christ spoke there with Nicodemus. The name translates to Arabic as Dayr al-Qiddīs Nīqūdhīmūs (دير القديس نيقوذيموس, "Monastery of St Nicodemus"), and in Greek to Hierá Monḗ Ágiou Nīkodḗmou (Ἱερά Μονή Ἁγίου Νικοδήμου, "Holy Monastery of St Nicodemus").

== History ==
=== Crusader period ===
The Church of Saint Elias (Sanct Helye) was built by the Crusaders on top of older vaulted undercrofts. It was located in the Judaria or Juiverie, the former Jewish quarter resettled by Eastern Christians after the exclusion of Jews from the city by the Latin rulers.

=== Ottoman period ===
The Jacobites (Syrian Orthodox) bought the building from its Muslim owner in 1527 or 1532, and renovated it late in that century. (The Syriacs still worship at the Chapel of St Nicodemus in the Church of the Holy Sepulchre.)

It is not known when the Jacobites lost the church - Eugene Hoade wrote that it was confiscated and turned into a mosque -, but throughout most of the 19th century it was used as a storehouse and for other non-ecclesiastical purposes.

Around 1865, the Greeks bought the property, and although it was still used as part of a house in 1896, sometime between that year and 1908 they restored the building and dedicated it to St Nicodemus. They removed the western wall and the porch of the Crusader church in order to expand the nave and made some additional modifications to the building, which had until then preserved its medieval outline, as documented by 19th-century researchers.

=== Current state ===
As of 2022, its supervisor is Archimandrite Makarios.
