= 4th century in poetry =

== Roman empire ==
=== Poets ===
- Ephrem the Syrian (306–373), Nisibis, writing in Syriac
- Faltonia Betitia Proba (c. 306/c. 315 – c. 353/c. 366)
- Ausonius (310–395), Bordeaux
- Himerius (315–386), from Bithynia writing in Greek
- Prudentius (348–405/413) in Tarraconensis, writing in Latin
- Claudian (?–404)

Dates Unknown:

- Avienius, Volsinii, Etruria, writing in Latin
- Nonnus, Egypt, writing in Greek
- Quintus Smyrnaeus, writing in Greek
- Symphosius, perhaps North African, writing in Latin
- Tryphiodorus, Egypt, writing in Greek
- Palladas, Alexandria, Egypt, writing in Greek

== South Asia ==
- Kalidasa, writing in Sanskrit
- Amara Sinha, Sanskrit grammarian and poet

== China ==
=== Poets (by date of birth) ===
- Tao Yuanming (365/372–427)
- Xie Lingyun (385–433)

== Timeline ==
- 365 – Tao Qian simplified Chinese: 陶潜; traditional Chinese: 陶潛; pinyin: Táo Qián; Wade–Giles: T'ao Ch'ien, also known as Tao Yuanming 陶淵明, perhaps born this year (died 427)
- 385 – Xie Lingyun (died 433)
