= Bahiya Bubsit =

Saudi short story writer (born 1967)

Bahiya Bubsit (Arabic: بهية بوسبيت;born 1967) is a Saudi Arabian short story writer.

== Biography ==
Born in Hofuf, Bubsit finished her secondary education in 1976, and has since worked in administration at the Educational Counseling Office of her native city. A member of the Women of al-Ahsa' Charitable Association and the Culture and Arts Association of al-Taif, she was awarded the Abha Cultural Prize in 1991. Beginning in 1985 she has written and published a number of volumes of short stories.

== Awards ==
Bahiya has received several awards for her storytelling prowess. Among these are the Abha Cultural Award for Story, an accolade from the Qassim Literary Club competition for Story, and a Certificate of Excellence in Short Story from the Jeddah Literary Club.
