= Kuthayyir =

Arab poet

- كثير بن عبد الرحمن
- Born: Kuthayyir ibn 'Abd al-Rahman c. 660; Medina
- Died: c. 723
- Occupation: Poet
- Writing career
- Language: Arabic
- Period: Umayyad period
- Genres: Love poetry, Panegyric

Kuthayyir ibn ‘Abd al-Raḥman (Arabic: كثير بن عبد الرحمن) (c. 660 – c. 723), commonly known as Kuthayyir ‘Azzah (Arabic: كثيّر عزّة) was an Arab 'Udhri poet of the Umayyad period from the tribe of Azd. He was born in Medina and resided in Hijaz and Egypt. In his poems he was occupied with his unfulfilled love to a married woman named 'Azza. Favorite topics in his poetry are love and panegyrics. He made acquaintance of the governor Abd al-Aziz ibn Marwan and the caliphs Abd al-Malik ibn Marwan, Umar ibn Abd al-Aziz and Yazid II. He is mentioned as one of the followers of the now-extinct Kaysaniyya sect of Shi'ism, which held that Ali's third son Muhammad ibn Al-Hanafiyya would return as the Mahdi.

== See also ==
- Jamil ibn Ma'mar
- List of Arabic language poets
- List of Shi'a Muslims
