= Ali Al-Fazzani =

Libyan poet

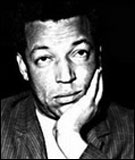
- Born: 1936 Surman
- Died: 27 September 2000 (aged 63–64) Bern, Switzerland
- Occupation: poet, writer

Ali Al-Fazzani (Arabic: علي الفزاني; 1936–2000) was a Libyan poet born in the city of Surman. He was one of the founders of the Libyan Writers' Union and the founder of the Benghazi branch of the Writers and Authors Association.
