= Arator =

Sixth-century Christian poet

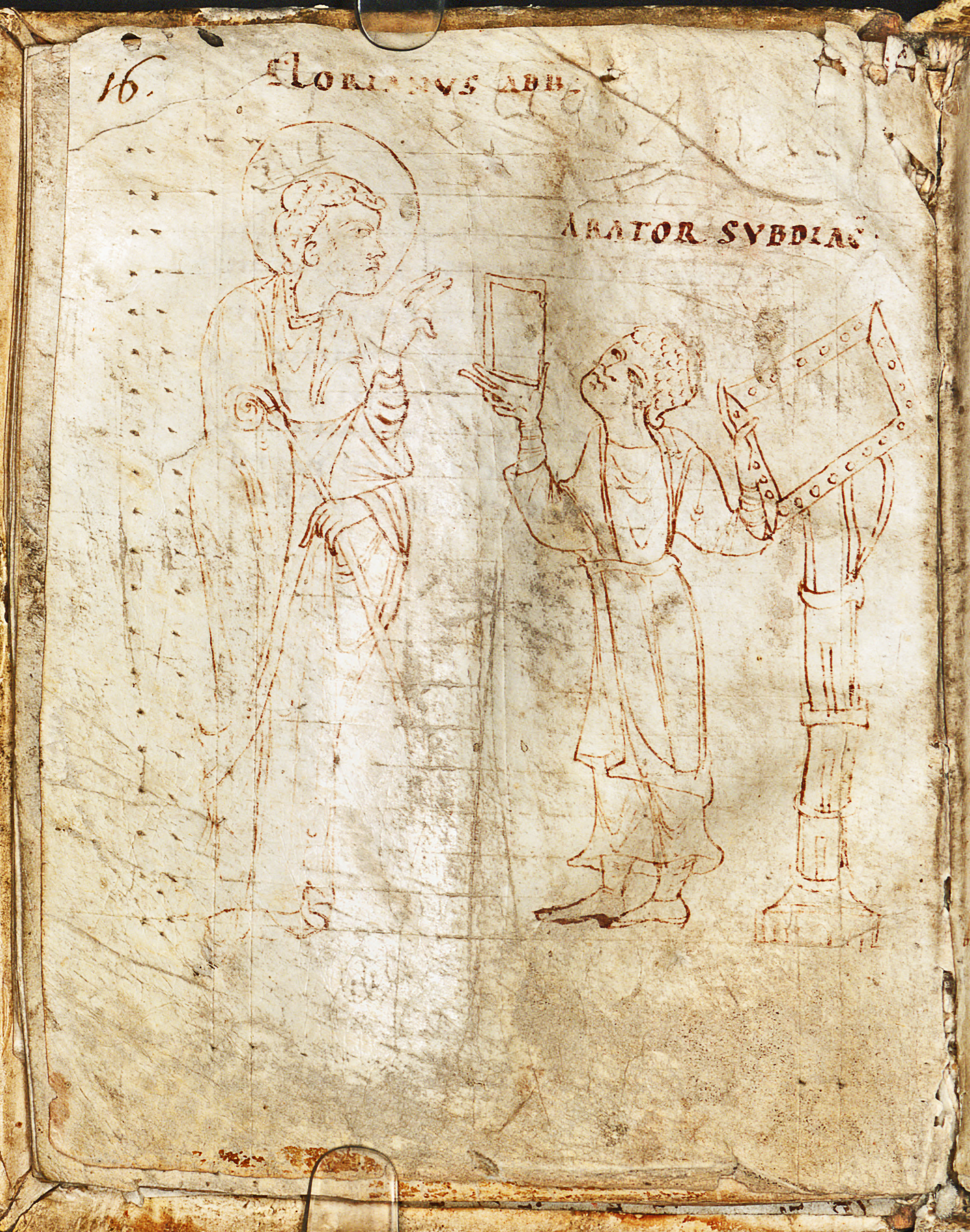
- Illustration from a 10th-century manuscript of subdeacon Arator (right) with the abbot Florian, to whom his Historia Apostolica is dedicated. Florian is depicted with a halo, possibly due to confusion with Saint Florian, a much earlier figure.
- Born: c. 490; Liguria
- Died: after 544
- Occupations: poet, statesman
- Notable work: De Actibus Apostolorum

Arator (b. c. 490 – after 544) was a sixth-century Christian poet from Liguria in northwestern Italy. His best known work, De Actibus Apostolorum, is a verse history of the Apostles.

== Biography ==
Arator was probably of Ligurian origin. An orphan, he studied at Milan under the patronage of the Bishop Laurentius and of Magnus Felix Ennodius, then went to Ravenna by the advice of Parthenius, nephew of Ennodius. He took up the career of a lawyer.

Treated with distinction by Theodoric on account of his oration in behalf of the Dalmatians, and protected by Cassiodorus, he spent much of his career in Ravenna, doing the Gothic state some service with the fruits of a classical education second to none in what until recently had been the Western Roman Empire. It may have been the death of King Theoderic, and the destabilizing of the Gothic regime, that caused Arator to leave Ravenna (in this the career of Cassiodorus is parallel) and make for Rome. Pope Vigilius made him Subdeacon of the Roman Church. It was there that he wrote in hexameters two books De Actibus Apostolorum, about 544. His gratitude to Vigilius, as expressed in a short poetic letter that dedicates the poem to him, shows notable warmth, and admiration of the see of Peter, and especially the apostle himself, together with strong animosity against the Goths—or at least their Arianism—is very clear in the poem.

Arator follows the story of the Acts of the Apostles; the first book, dedicated to St. Peter, concludes with Chapter XII; the second, dedicated to St. Paul, with the martyrdom of the two Apostles. Many important events are omitted, others only alluded to. Arator’s method in distilling Acts into epic verse is to select what he sees as its most important events, and to mould each of these into short episodes in which there is a simple, edifying, narrative or theme. Exegesis, often presented in homiletic fashion and invariably elaborated by formal rhetoric, is nowhere absent, but Arator gives formal exegesis greater weight than his predecessors had, by adding to almost every episode a kind of exegetical excursus, of equal or often greater length. Such a passage may present an issue arising directly from the text of Acts, or go beyond it to explore a particular feature. Arator’s fascination with allegory and obvious delight in exploring allegorical significance of themes, names, and numbers gives his work a wide perspective, as he ranges through Scripture and draws on material at first sight extraneous to Acts.

Arator's style and versification are fairly correct, and he cleverly evades the entanglements of symbolism. The poem was very successful. Vigilius had the author read it in public at the church of San Pietro in Vincoli in Rome. The reading lasted four days, as the poet had to repeat many passages by request of his audience. The euphoria of the occasion, and the poem, was soon to be succeeded by more stressful times, and it may be that the author died within a few years, perhaps when the Goths sacked Rome in 546.

Arator's works remained popular during the Middle Ages, when they became classics, being eclipsed as curriculum texts only in the 12th century. Arator also wrote two addresses in distichs to the Abbot Florianus and to Vigilius, as well as a letter to Parthenius. The latter two pieces contain biographical details.

== General and cited source ==
- Licht, Tino (2008). "Aratoris fortuna". Quaerite Faciem Eius Semper. Hamburg: 163–179. doi:10.11588/heidok.00011581.
- See also Roger P. H. Green, Latin Epics of the New Testament: Juvencus, Sedulius, Arator, Oxford UP, 2008, ISBN 978-0-19-928457-3 (reviewed by Teresa Morgan in the article "Poets for Jesus", Times Literary Supplement, 4 April 2008, p. 31).
