= Mohammed Abdalbari =

Sudanese poet and writer (born 1985)

Mohammed Abdelbari
- محمد عبدالباري
- Abdulbari in 2017
- Born: 12 January 1985; Al Manaqil City
- Education: Master of Arabic Language and Literature, University of Jordan, Jordan
- Occupation: Poet

Mohammed Abdullah Abdelbari (Arabic: محمد عبدالباري; born January 12, 1985, in Al-Manaqil city, Sudan ) is a Sudanese poet and literary writer. His poems are inspired by various traditions, including Sufism and philosophy. He has published five collections of poems and won several literary awards and honors across the Arab world, such as the Prince Abdullah Al-Faisal International Award for Arabic Poetry (2019), the African Arab Youth Award (2016) and the Sharjah Award for Arab Creativity (2013). He has been considered as "one of the most influential voices in contemporary Arabic poetry."

== Early life ==
Abdelbari was born in Al-Manaqil city, Al-Jazirah State, Sudan. During his early life, his family moved to Saudi Arabia. They settled in Riyadh, where he grew up and completed his early education in Al-Jaradiyah neighborhood, one of the oldest and most densely populated neighborhoods in the center of the Saudi capital.

== Education ==
Abdelbari received his education from primary school to the undergraduate level in Riyadh. After obtaining a bachelor's degree in Arabic Language and Literature, he moved to Jordan, where he obtained a master's degree from the University of Jordan at Amman city. His thesis dealt with poetry in the heritage of Islamic philosophy, as well as with logicians, theologians and scholars of rhetoric.

== Reception ==
Abdelbari earned early recognition for his poetry. While he was an undergraduate student in his early twenties, his poems were included in a poetry collection titled "The Modern Saudi Literature" that is required reading in many Saudi universities. Further, some of Abdelbari's poems have become part of the literary syllabus of public education in a number of Arab countries.

Further, Abdelbari's poetry has received wide reception both academically and publicly. His public poetry performances and media appearances have taken place throughout the Arab world and the Middle East. Also, his poetry has been the subject of academic reviews, articles, studies, and Master's and Doctoral theses in several universities of Sudan, Palestine, Libya, Algeria, and Saudi Arabia. His recognition has exceeded the borders of the Arab world to other cultural regions. Thus, people in countries such as Turkey, China, and Senegal have appreciated his poems in various forms, such as translations.

In February 2023, literary magazine ArabLit published English translations of four of his poems and called his poetry "a journey in the Arabic poetic landscape that extends from the Jahiliya to this day."

== Works ==
Mohammed Abdelbari has so far released three collections of poems. These collections are:

1. The First Fire Elegy (in Arabic: مرثية النار الأولى).
2. As If You've Never (in Arabic: كأنك لم).
3. The Crescents (in Arabic: الأهلة).
4. No Longer Blue (in Arabic: لم يعد أزرقاً)
5. A Song to Cross the River Twice (in Arabic: أغنية لعبور النهر مرتين )

== Awards and recognition ==
Abdelbari has won several important awards in the field of Arabic poetry, notably:

- Prince Abdullah Al-Faisal International Award for Arabic Poetry (2019)
- Arabic Poetry Festival (2016)
- The African Arab Youth Award (2016) at the second session in the field of poetry, co-sponsored by the African Union and the League of Arab States.
- The Snoussi Poetry Award from Saudi Arabia (2016) at the fourth session.
- Sharjah Award for Arab Creativity in the United Arab Emirates (2013)

== See also ==
- List of Sudanese writers
- Sudanese literature
- Arabic poetry
