= Al-Akhtal al-Taghlibi =

Iraqi poet (640-708)

Al-Akhtal
- غياث بن غوث بن الصلت بن طارقة التغلبي
- Born: 19/640; Al-Hirah or Sergiopolis
- Died: 92/708
- Occupation: Poet
- Children: Malik ibn al-Akhtal
- Writing career
- Genres: Panegyric, Satire
- Notable work: Khaffat al-Qatīnu

Ghiyath ibn Ghawth ibn al-Salt ibn Tariqa al-Taghlibi (Arabic: غياث بن غوث بن الصلت بن طارقة التغلبي) commonly known as al-Akhtal (Arabic: الأخطل, lit. 'The Loquacious') was one of the most famous Arab poets of the Umayyad period. He belonged to the Banu Taghlib tribe, and was, like his fellow-tribesmen, a Christian.

== Biography ==
Al-Akhtal al-Taghlibî was one of the great panegyrists of the Umayyad period. He became famous for his satires and panegyrics in a period when poetry was an important political instrument. Al-Akhtal was introduced to Yazid I by Ka'b ibn Ju'ayl and became a close friend of the heir apparent to Caliph Mu'awiya I (r. 661–680). Yazid, when he acceded to the throne, was generous to al-Akhtal. Despite his Christianity, he was favored by leading Umayyad caliphs. Throughout his life, al-Akhtal was a supporter of the ruling Umayyad dynasty. He was a friend of John of Damascus until the latter decided to give up his position at the Umayyad court and become a monk.

He lauded in his panegyrics Yazid, Abd al-Malik ibn Marwan and al-Walid I and in his satires attacked all the opponents of the caliphs. Al-Akhtal became the official court poet of Abd al-Malik, to whom he dedicated a number of panegyrics. But he fell into disfavour under al-Walid. The pre-Islamic Bedouin tradition is always apparent in the poems of al-Akhtal and his panegyrics show the continued vitality of this tradition. The panegyrics of al-Akhtal acquired a classical status. His poetry was accepted by critics as source of pure Arabic.

Few details are known about al-Akhtal's personal life, save that he was married and divorced, and that he spent part of his time in Damascus, part with his tribe in the Jazira (Upper Mesopotamia). In the Taghlib–Qays war he participated on the battlefield, as well as by his satires. In the literary strife between his contemporaries Jarir ibn Atiyah and al-Farazdaq, Akhtal was induced to support the latter poet. Al-Akhtal, Jarir and al-Farazdaq form a trio celebrated among the Arabs, but as to superiority there is dispute. Abu Ubayda placed him highest of the three on the ground that among his poems there were ten flawless qasidas (Arabic poetic odes), and ten more nearly so, and that this could not be said of the other two.

Al-Akhtil street in the Bab az-Zahra neighbourhood of Jerusalem is named after him.

== Works ==
The Poetry of al-Akhtal has been published at the Jesuit press in Beirūt, 1891. A full account of the poet and his times is given in H. Lammens’ Le chantre des Omiades (Paris, 1895) (a reprint from the Journal Asiatique for 1894).
