= Dracontius =

North African Christian lawyer and poet (c. 455 – c. 505)

Blossius Aemilius Dracontius (c. 455 – c. 505 AD) of Carthage was a Christian poet who flourished in Roman Africa during the latter part of the 5th century. He belonged to a family of landowners, and practiced as a lawyer in his native place. After the conquest of the country by the Vandals, Dracontius was at first allowed to retain possession of his estates, but was subsequently despoiled of his property and thrown into prison by the Vandal king Gaiseric, whose triumphs he had omitted to celebrate, while he had written a panegyric on a foreign and hostile ruler. He subsequently addressed an elegiac poem to the king, asking pardon, and pleading for release. The result is not known, but it is supposed that Dracontius obtained his liberty and migrated to northern Roman Italy in search of peace and quiet. This is consistent with the discovery at Bobbio of a 15th-century MS., now in the Biblioteca Nazionale at Naples, containing a number of poems by Dracontius (the Carmina minora).

The most important of his works is the De laudibus Dei in three books. The account of the creation, which occupies the greater part of the first book, was at an early date edited separately under the title of Hexameron, and it was not till 1791 that the three books were edited by Faustino Arévalo. The apology (Satisfactio) consists of 158 elegiac couplets; it is generally supposed that the king addressed is Gunthamund (484–496). The Carmina minora, nearly all in hexameter verse, consist of school exercises and rhetorical declamations, amongst others the fable of Hylas, with a preface to his tutor, the grammarian Felicianus; De raptu Helenae (The Rape of Helen); Medea; and two epithalamia. It is also probable that Dracontius was the author of the Orestis Tragoedia, a poem of some 1,000 hexameters, which in language, metre, and general treatment of the subject exhibits a striking resemblance to the other works of Dracontius.

Opinions differ as to his poetical merits, but, when due allowance is made for rhetorical exaggeration and consequent want of lucidity, his works show considerable vigour of expression, and a remarkable knowledge of the Bible and of Roman classical literature.

== Editions ==
- Francisco Arevalo (ed.) (1791). Dracontii Poetae Christiani Saeculi V.: Carmina ex manuscriptis Vaticanis duplo auctiora iis, quae adhuc prodierunt. Rome.
- Carpzov, Ioh. Bened. (ed.) (1794). Dracontii presbyteri hispanti, Carmen epicum Hexaemeron. Helmstad.
- Galli Milić, Lavinia (ed., comm.) (2008). Blossi Aemilii Dracontii, Romulea VI-VII. Testi con commento filologico, vol. 18. Firenze: Felice le Monnier.
- Luceri, Angelo (ed.) (2007). Gli epitalami di Blossio Emilio Draconzio (Rom. 6 e 7). Biblioteca di cultura romanobarbarica, vol. 10. Roma: Herder.
- Pohl, Katharina (ed.) (2019). Dracontius: De raptu Helenae. Palingenesia, vol. 114. Stuttgart: Steiner, ISBN 978-3-515-12216-0.
