= Coluthus =

Greek epic poet

Coluthus or Colluthus of Lycopolis (Ancient Greek: Κόλουθος, romanized: Kolouthos; fl. 500 AD) was a Greek-Egyptian epic poet of the late Roman Empire who flourished during the reign of Anastasius I in the Thebaid.

== Calydoniaca and The Abduction of Helen ==
According to the Suda, Colothus was the author of a Calydoniaca in six books, doubtless an account of the Calydonian boar hunt, Persica, probably an encomium on emperor Anastasius composed at the end of the Persian wars, and Encomia, or laudatory poems. The Suda does not mention "The Abduction of Helen".

All works mentioned in the Suda are lost, but his poem in 392 hexameters on The Abduction of Helen (Ἁρπαγὴ Ἑλένης) is still extant, having been discovered by Cardinal Bessarion in Calabria. The Abduction opens with an invocation to the nymphs of the Troad whom the poet asks for information about Paris as the originator of the Trojan conflict (1–16), followed by the account of how the gods attended the wedding of Thetis and Peleus, how they forgot to invite Eris, who searched for retaliation throwing a golden apple amongst the gods (17–63); Hera, Athena and Aphrodite all want to have it and Zeus orders Hermes to take the three goddesses to visit the handsome shepherd Paris, who should award the apple to one of them (64–79); the goddesses enhance their appearances before meeting up the shepherd, with Aphrodite launching a speech on her court of Erotes (80–100). Paris, more interested in playing the pipes than in taking care of his sheep, receives from Hermes the assignment to award the apple to the most beautiful goddess (101–30); submitting to his eyes, Athena offers him courage and victory in war, Hera to make him lord of all Asia, and Aphrodite, baring her breasts, the hand of Helen (131–65); Paris awards the apple to Aphrodite, who scorns Hera and Athena, and prepares his trip to Sparta to seduce Helen (166–200). The trip to Sparta begins with bad presages, but his fleet reaches Sparta without hazards and he sets towards the town on foot (201–46). Helen opens the door to him and, instantly attracted towards him, initiates a dialogue with him: Paris tells her that he is the son of Priam, king of Troy, and that Aphrodite promised him to make him Helen's spouse (247–302). Helen agrees to elope with Paris and they do so during the night (303–25). Hermione wakes up the following morning and searches for her mother, considering the possibilities that she got lost in the mountains or was drowned in the river (326–62). She falls asleep exhausted and sees her mother in her dreams telling her that she was abducted by the foreigner who visited them the previous day (363–79). Hermione calls her father to return, while on seeing the arrival of the couple from the walls of Troy, Cassandra sheds her veil and tears her hair (380–92).

The anonymous writer in the Encyclopædia Britannica Eleventh Edition described the poem as "dull and tasteless, devoid of imagination, a poor imitation of Homer, and [having] little to recommend it except its harmonious versification, based upon the technical rules of Nonnus". It has been more recently re-evaluated as a "short and charming miniature epic".

== Printed editions ==
The first printed edition was by Aldus Manutius, Venice, possibly in 1505.

Early editions by John Daniel van Lennep (1747, the first critical edition, collating six mss.), G.F. Schafer (1825), E. Abel (1880) and W. Weinberger (Teubner, 1896), have been superseded by that of Enrico Livrea (1968).

The best manuscript of this difficult and corrupt text is the so-called Codex Mutinensis (Bibliothèque nationale suppl. graec. 388) which Hall, Companion to Classical Texts, p. 278, says "was never at Modena but was brought by the French in the Napoleonic wars at the beginning of the 19th century from somewhere in North Italy".
