= Asma bint Marwan =

Female Arab poet of 7th-century Arabia

ʻAṣmāʼ bint Marwān (Arabic: عصماء بنت مروان "Ãsma, daughter of Marwan") was a female Arab poet said to have lived in Medina in 7th-century Arabia. Whether Muhammad ordered her assassinated for agitating against him is a subject of debate.

== Islamic sources ==
=== Family and death ===
Both Ibn Ishaq and Ibn Sa'd wrote accounts of Asma bint Marwan's family and death. According to them, her family viewed Muhammad and his followers as unwelcome interlopers in Medina. After the Muslim victory over the Quraysh in Mecca in 624 in the Battle of Badr, a number of Muhammad's opponents were killed. In response, she composed poems that publicly criticized the local tribesmen who converted to Islam and allied with Muhammad, and that called for his death. Her poems also ridiculed Medinians for obeying a chief not of their kin. The two sources appear to disagree about whether Muhammad's then ordered her death or not.

==== Ibn Ishaq's account ====
Ibn Ishaq collected oral traditions about the life of Muhammad, some of which survive through the writings of Ibn Hisham and Ibn Jarir al-Tabari. Ibn Ishaq mentions that bint Marwan displayed disgust after the Medinian Abu Afak was killed for inciting rebellion against Muhammad. The poem said: "do you expect good from (Muhammad) after the killing of your chiefs" and asked: "Is there no man of pride who would attack him by surprise/ And cut off the hopes of those who expect aught from him?" Upon hearing the poem, Muhammad then called for her death in turn, saying "Who will rid me of Marwan's daughter?" Umayr bin Adiy al-Khatmi, a blind man belonging to the same tribe as Asma bint Marwan's husband, Banu Khatma, responded that he would. He crept into her room in the dark of night where she was sleeping with her five children, with her infant child close to her bosom. Umayr removed the child from Asma's breast and killed her.

Ibn Ishaq goes on to say that the following morning, Umayr came told Muhammad what he had done and the prophet responded: "You have helped God and His apostle, O Umayr!" And when asked what consequences he might have to bear, Muhammad said, "Two goats won't butt their heads about her."

When Umayr returned to the Banu Khatma, the tribe of which both Asma and Umayr were members, he then openly declared: "I have killed bint Marwan, O sons of Khatma. Withstand me if you can; don't keep me waiting." This was apparently the first open statement of allegiance to the Muslim cause by a member of that tribe, and more of its members became Muslims shortly after.

==== Ibn Sa'd's account ====
On the other hand Al-Waqidi's and Ibn Sa'd's accounts differ substantially from that of Ibn Ishaq. In these the killing of Asma bint Marwan does not stem from a statement by Muhammad as he is described as being in Badr during this time and not in Medina. Instead, according to al-Waqidi, a man named ʿUmayr bin ʿAdī decided on his own to kill Asma bint Marwan as a bargain with God to return the prophet safely to Medina in exchange.

This account is considered fabricated by hadith scholars, including Al-Albani, Majdi, and Al-Jawzi.

=== Hadith scholar views on the authenticity of the story ===
Classical and post-classical hadith scholars have rejected the accounts of the murder, declaring it a fabrication (mawḍūʻ'). They point out in their arguments that the chains of transmission (isnads) by which the story was passed along are all weak (daʻif) and of the lowest degree of reliability.

==== Ibn Ishaq's narrative ====
Ibn Ishaq's Sīratu Rasūlu l-Lāh, an important early work of sīra, was composed over 100 years after Muhammad's death, using oral traditions passed down from his early followers. A number of isnads go back to Ibn 'Abbas, a companion of Muhammad. However, the accuracy of this story for use as hadith is not completely accepted. Later scholars including Ibn ʻAdī, Ibn al-Jawzi, Muhammad al-Bukhari, Yahya ibn Ma'een and Al-Daraqutni, have questioned the reliability of the hadith based on the negative academic reputation of certain individuals in the chain, including Muhammad ibn al-Hajjaj al-Lakhmi and Mujalid ibn Sa’ed, both whom were regarded by the authoritative Al-Bukhari as weak transmitters.

==== Ibn Sa'd's & Al-Waqidi's narrative ====
Al-Albani declared Ibn Sa'd's chain of transmission to be weak as well, as it includes Al-Waqidi, who has been condemned as an untrustworthy narrator and has been frequently and severely criticized by hadith scholars. Thus his narrations have been abandoned by the majority of them. Yahya ibn Ma'een said: "Al-Waqidi narrated 20,000 false hadith about the prophet". Al-Shafi'i, Ahmad ibn Hanbal and Al-Albani said: "Al-Waqidi is a liar" while Al-Bukhari said he didn't include a single letter by Al-Waqidi in his hadith works.

In addition, this isnad is discontinued as Al-Harith ibn al-Fudayl never met any of Muhammad's companions.

== See also ==
- Umm Qirfa
- Ka'b ibn al-Ashraf
- Prophetic biography
- List of biographies of Muhammad
