= Al-Kumayt ibn Zayd al-Asadi =

Islamic poet whose poems praise Mohammed and his family

al-Kumayt ibn Zayd al-Asadi
- الكميت بن زيد الأسدي
- Born: c. 60 AH / 680 CE; Kufa, Iraq
- Died: c. 126 AH / 743 CE; Kufa, Iraq
- Cause of death: Killed during the Abbasid Revolution (disputed)
- Occupation: Poet
- Era: Umayyad Caliphate
- Known for: Early Islamic poetry; support of the Ahl al-Bayt; author of al-Hāshimiyyāt
- Notable work: al-Hāshimiyyāt
- Movement: Shi'a supporter

al-Kumayt ibn Zayd al-Asadi (Arabic: الكميت بن زيد الأسدي) (679/680 – 743 CE) was a renowned Arabian poet from Kufa and a devout supporter of Muhammad al-Baqir, the fifth of the twelve Shia imams. His Hashimiyyat, in praise of the Ahl al-Bayt, is considered among the earliest evidence for the doctrine of imamate. Likely to avoid the persecution by the Umayyads, he also wrote in praise of the caliphs. He used the language of the Bedouins to write poems in praise of Muhammad, as well as 'Ali and his family. He was a schoolteacher at a local mosque until he was encouraged to write poetry instead. He wrote several series of poems including: his Mudhahhaba, his Malhama, and, arguably his most famous series, the Hāshimīyyāt. al-Kumayt was imprisoned by the caliph for his writings and escaped through the help of his wife. He later received a pardon from the caliph and was allowed to return to Kufa. While going to recite a poem, al-Kumayt was attacked by his Yemeni guards and killed.

His poems, the Hāshimīyyāt, have been edited by J. Horovitz (Leiden, 1904). An account of him is contained in the Kitab ul-Aghani, xv.113-130.

== Criticism ==
al-Kumayt's poetry has been the subject of critical analysis by his contemporaries and modern scholars. Below are some of things that have been said of his poetry:

- Abu 'Ikrima has said: "But for the poetry of al-Kumayt [Ibn Zayd] Language would have no interpreter, nor Eloquence a tongue".
- Al-Farazdaq said: "Al-Kumayt was the poet of the first and the last" ("The Great Revolutionary…")
- An article by van Gelder suggests that al-Kumayt's poetry lacks "concreteness" and "vivid description".
- al-Mufaddal, said: "Recite to me any of his motifs that you find extraordinary, and I shall give you the same from [real] Arab [i.e. bedouin] poems!".
- al-Hari-ri said: "al- Kumayt was one of those who made artificial poetry and to whom it does not come naturally".

== Controversy ==
There is controversy surrounding al-Kumayt and if his sympathies lay with 'Ali and his family or the Umayyads. An article by W. F. Madelung suggests that al-Kumayt was not praising the family of the Prophet specifically, but rather the Banu Hashim as a whole. He believes that al-Kumayt wanted the caliphate to be given to the Banu Hashim, but not necessarily the family of the Prophet. He says that, "The Hashimite imam for whose advent [al-Kumayt] was praying need not be a descendant of 'Ali" (Madelung 9).

On the other hand, Horovitz in the Encyclopedia of Islam suggests that al-Kumayt is clearly praising 'Ali and his family. He says, "he came under the influence of the S̲h̲īʿi tendencies of his native town and these had a decisive effect on the direction that his career was to take, inspiring him with violently pro-ʿAlid opinions".

Later, Horovitz sums up his belief that al-Kumayt had conflicting poetry by saying, "[al-Kumayt] was capable of composing eulogies simultaneously to the 'Alids and the Umayyads."

== Bibliography ==
- Lalani, Arzina R. (2000). Early Shi'i Thought: The Teachings of Imam Muhammad Al-Baqir. I. B. Tauris. ISBN 978-1860644344.
- Jafri, S.H.M. (1979). Origins and Early Development of Shi'a Islam. Longman. ISBN 0582780802.
- W. F. Madelung (1989). "The "Hāshimiyyāt" of al-Kumayt and Hāshimī Shi'ism". Studia Islamica. 70. Maisonneuve & Larose: 5–26. JSTOR 1595676.
- Horovitz, J. "al- Kumayt b. Zayd al- Asadī, Abu 'l- Mustahill." Encyclopaedia of Islam, Second Edition. Edited by: P. Bearman, Th. Bianquis, C.E. Bosworth, E. van Donzel and W.P. Heinrichs. Brill, 2010. Brill Online. Augustana. 13 April 2010
- Jan Van Gelder, Geert. "'The Most Natural Poem of the Arabs': An Addition to the "Diwan" of Al-Kumayt Ibn Zayd." Journal of Arabic Literature 19.2 (1988): 95–107. JSTOR. Web. 25 March 2010.
- Kumayt Al-Asadi: the Great Revolutionary Shi'ite Poet, Imam Reza (A.S.) Network. Web. 13 April 2010.
- Madelung, W. F. "The "Hashimayyat" of Al-Kumayt and Hashimi Shi'ism." Studia Islamica 70 (1989): 5–26. JSTOR. Web. 25 March 2010.
- "Victory News Magazine | Poetry | Al-Kumayt's Longing for Seeing Imam Baqir (as)." | Victory News Magazine | Front Page |. Web. 13 April 2010. http://www.victorynewsmagazine.com/AlKumaytLongingSeeImamBaqirA.htm
