= Banu Udhra =

Arab tribe

The Banu Udhra (Arabic: بني عذرة, romanized: Banū ʿUdhra) was a nomadic Arab tribe which mainly dwelt in the Wadi al-Qura region in the northern Hejaz near the southern approaches of Syria. The tribe was part of the Quda'a confederation.

== Location ==
From the pre-Islamic period, the Udhra dwelt in what the Arabic sources referred to as Masharif al-Sham ('the approaches of Syria'), especially in the Wadi al-Qura region, as far north as the Tayma oasis. They largely remained there during the early Islamic period, though some clans of the tribe had migrated into Syria and later Egypt and Muslim Spain. In Spain, they largely settled in Jaen, Almeria and around Algericas.

== Genealogy ==
The Udhra were a constituent of the Quda'a group. In the Arab genealogical tradition the tribe traced its descent to the Quda'a as follows: Udhra ibn Sa'd Hudhaym ibn Zayd ibn Layth ibn Sud ibn Aslum ibn al-Haf ibn Quda'a. They were the main component of the Quda'a's Sa'd Hudhaym group and incorporated their brother tribes of Banu Harith and Banu Salaman. The best known early authority on the Udhra's genealogy was a member of the Banu Harith, the late-7th-century al-Nakhkhar ibn Aws ibn Ubayr al-Udhri, who preserved the tribe's genealogical tradition before it was incorporated into the major 8th-century Arab genealogy monographs. The Udhra are sometimes confused with the Udhra branch of the Banu Kalb, another important Quda'a tribe. The two main sub-branches of the Udhra during the early Islamic period were the brother clans of Hunn ibn Rabi'a and Rizah ibn Rabi'a.

== Religion ==
In the pre-Islamic period, part of the Udhra were Christians and part followed Arabian polytheistic cults. The tribe, or significant parts of it, converted to Islam after a delegation to the Islamic prophet Muhammad led by one of their chiefs, Ziml ibn Amr, in May or June 630.

== History ==
During the pre-Islamic period, the Udhra had a protection arrangement with the Jewish farmers of Wadi al-Qura, stipulating a share in their crops in return for staving off raids from other Bedouin tribes. They maintained close links with the Quraysh of Mecca, especially the Banu Zuhra clan, and, to a lesser extent, the Aws and Khazraj tribes of Yathrib (Medina).

The Udhra did not play a prominent role in the early Muslim state. The scant mention of the tribe during the campaigns of Muhammad and the Ridda wars suggests the tribe had a weak position in the politics of the Hejaz and likely submitted to the Muslim state with little or no resistance. Ziml ibn Amr served as head of the Umayyad caliph Mu'awiya I's shurta (select troops) and of Yazid I's diwan al-khatam (bureau of the seal), which dealt with caliphal correspondences. The tribe was evidently favored by Caliph Umar II (r. 717–720), who appointed members Uthman ibn Sa'd al-Udhri and Abd al-Rahman ibn Khashkhash al-Udhri as his governor in Damascus and his qadi (head judge), respectively.

== See also ==
- ʿUdhrī love

== Bibliography ==
- Donner, Fred M. (1981). The Early Islamic Conquests. Princeton: Princeton University Press. ISBN 0-691-05327-8.
- Lecker, M. (2000). "ʿUdhra". In Bearman, P. J.; Bianquis, Th.; Bosworth, C. E.; van Donzel, E. & Heinrichs, W. P. (eds.). The Encyclopaedia of Islam, Second Edition. Volume X: T–U. Leiden: E. J. Brill. pp. 773–774. ISBN 978-90-04-11211-7.
- Norris, H. T. (1996). "The Sad Fate of Bishr and Hind and the Diffusion of an Ancient Arabian Love Story". In Smith, G. Rex; Smart, J. R.; Pridham, B. R. (eds.). New Arabian Studies, Volume 3. Exeter: University of Exeter Press. pp. 79–111. ISBN 0-85989-479-7.
