= Abu 'Afak =

7th-century Arabian Jewish poet

Abu 'Afak (Arabic: أبو عفك, died c. 624) was a Jewish poet who allegedly lived in the Hijaz region (today Saudi Arabia). After Muhammad moved to the city of Al-Madina and started to preach Islam, Abu 'Afak did not convert to Islam and was vocal about his opposition to Muhammad. He became a significant political enemy of Muhammad and was subsequently assassinated by a follower of Muhammad.

As an elderly man, Abu 'Afak Arwan wrote a politically charged poem against Muhammad and his followers that is preserved in the Sira. Muhammad then allegedly called for Abu 'Afak's death, and Salim ibn Umayr killed him. The affair was recorded by Ibn Ishaq in "Sirat Rasul Allah" (The Life of the Prophet of God), the oldest biography of Muhammad.

== Sources ==
=== Ibn Ishaq's account ===
The following is an excerpt from Alfred Guillaume's translation of Ibn Ishaq's prophetic biography, chapter "Salim b. Umayr's expedition to kill Abu Afak".

Abu 'Afak was one of the B. Amr b. Auf of the B. Ubayda clan. He showed his disaffection when the apostle [Muhammad] killed al-Harith b. Suwayd b. Samit and said:

Long have I lived but never have I seen
An assembly or collection of people
More faithful to their undertaking
And their allies when called upon
Than the sons of Qayla when they assembled,
Men who overthrew mountains and never submitted,
A rider who came to them split them in two (saying)
"Permitted", "Forbidden", of all sorts of things.
Had you believed in glory or kingship
You would have followed Tubba.

The apostle [Muhammad] said, "Who will deal with this rascal for me?" Whereupon Salim b. Umayr, brother of B. Amr b. Auf, one of the "weepers", went forth and killed him. Umama b. Muzayriya said concerning that:

You gave the lie to God's religion and the man Ahmad [the prophet]!
By him who was your father, evil is the son he produced!
A hanif gave you a thrust in the night saying
Take that, Abu Afak, in spite of your age!
Though I knew whether it was man or jinn
Who slew you in the dead of night (I would say naught).

But there is no chain of transmission mentioned for the story through Ibn Ishaq, and therefore either Ibn Ishaq narrated the story without chain, or the chain is missing (since Ibn Ishaq's prophetic biography have not been transmitted completely, but some of which survive through the writings of Ibn Hisham and Ibn Jarir al-Tabari.).

This is with the knowledge that Ibn Ishaq was born at least 67 years after the death of Muhammad.

=== Waqidi's account ===
The following is an excerpt from Rizwi Faizer's translation of Waqidi's military history, chapter “The Expedition to Kill Abu ‘Afak”.

Sa’id b. Muhammad related to us from ‘Umara b. Ghaziyya, and Abu Mus’ab related to us from Isma’il b. Mus’ab b. Isma’il b. Zayd b. Thabit from his elders, who said: “There was a sheikh of the Banu ‘Amr ibn ‘Awf called ‘Abu Afak. He was an old man who had reached one hundred and twenty years when the Prophet arrived in Medina. He provoked the enmity of the Prophet and did not enter Islam. When the Messenger of God went out to Badr and returned, and God granted him victory, Abu ‘Afak envited him and opposed him, saying:

‘Long have I lived but never have I seen
An assembly or collection of people,
more minds that came to a commitment swiftly when called.
A rider dispossessed them of their affairs,
splitting them into forbidden and permitted.
If it was kingship that you believed in,
you would have followed Tubba’.’

Salim b. ‘Umayr said – and he was one of the weepers of the Banu Najjar – ‘I vowed that I would kill Abu Afak or die in the attempt. I waited for a heedless moment.’ Then, one summer’s night, as Abu Afak slept in the courtyard with the Banu ‘Amr b. ‘Awf, Salim b. ‘Umayr approached, and pressed the sword upon his liver until it entered his bed. The enemy of God screamed. Those among the people who heard his words returned to him. They entered his place and buried him. They said, ‘Who killed him? By God, if we learn who killed him, we will surely kill him for it.’ Al-Nahdiyya, a Muslim woman, said these verses about that.

‘You lied about the religion of God and the man Ahmad.
By the life of he who produced you, miserable is what he produced.
A Hanif gave you, at the end of the night, a thrust.
Abu ‘Afak, take it inspite of your age.
Indeed if I knew who killed you in the dead of night
Whether man or Jinn, I would not say.’”

Ma’an b. ‘Umar related to me saying: “Ibn Ruqaysh informed me that Abu ‘Afak was killed in Shawwal, the twentieth month AH.”

However, Al Waqidi was said by many Islamic Hadith scholars to be an unreliable source of information. Al-Waqidi has been condemned as an untrustworthy narrator and has been frequently and severely criticized by scholars, thus his narrations have been abandoned by the majority of hadith scholars:

- Ahmad ibn Hanbal (d. 241 A.H.) said "He is a liar, makes alternations in the traditions".
- Al-Nasa’i (d. 303 A.H.) said "The liars known for fabricating the hadith of the Messenger of Allah are four. They are: Ibrahin Ibn Abi Yahya in Medina, Muqatil in Khurasan, Muhammad ibn Sa'id Al-masloub in Syria and Al-Waqidi in Baghdad."
- Al-Dhahabi (d. 748 A.H.) said "Consensus has taken place on the weakness of Al-Waqidi".
- Muhammad Nasiruddin al-Albani (d. 1999 C.E.) said "Al-Waqidi is accused of lying; He does not count."

=== Ibn Sa'd's accounts ===
Another description of this story comes from The Major Classes by ibn Sa'd al-Baghdadi:

"Then occurred the "sariyyah" [raid] of Salim Ibn Umayr al-Amri against Abu Afak, the Jew, in [the month of] Shawwal in the beginning of the twentieth month from the hijra, of the Apostle of Allah. Abu Afak, was from Banu Amr Ibn Awf, and was an old man who had attained the age of one hundred and twenty years. He was a Jew, and used to instigate the people against the Apostle of Allah, and composed (satirical) verses [about Muhammad]. Salim Ibn Umayr who was one of the great weepers and who had participated in Badr, said, "I take a vow that I shall either kill Abu Afak or die before him. He waited for an opportunity until a hot night came, and Abu Afak slept in an open place. Salim Ibn Umayr knew it, so he placed the sword on his liver and pressed it till it reached his bed. The enemy of Allah screamed and the people who were his followers, rushed to him, took him to his house and interred him."

Ibn Sa'd gives a second account, which cites his sources.

Muhammad ibn ‘Umar [Waqidi] reported from Sa’id ibn Muhammad az-Zuraqi from ‘Umara ibn Ghaziya that Abu Mus’ab Isma’il ibn Mus’ab ibn Isma’il ibn Zayd ibn Thabit related from his shaykhs that Abu ‘Afak was an old man of the Banu ‘Amr ibn Awf. He reached the age of one hundred and twenty and he heard about the Prophet but he did not enter Islam. Salim ibn ‘Umayr vowed to kill him and sought him until he killed him. That was at the command of the Prophet. Muhammad ibn ‘Umar [Waqidi] reported from Ma’n ibn ‘Umar from Ibn Ruqaysh of the Banu Asad ibn Khuzayma that Abu ‘Afak was killed in Shawwal at the beginning of the twentieth month of the Hijra [late March/early April 624].

Ibn Sa'd transmits the story through Al-Waqidi mentioned in the chain of transmission, who, as already mentioned above, has been criticized by Hadith as an unreliable source.

== See also ==
- Asma bint Marwan
- Jihad
- Ka'b ibn al-Ashraf
- Umm Qirfa
