= CIH 6 =

CIH 6, also known as RES 2637C, is a pre-Islamic Arabian inscription from South Arabia. It dates back to the 5th century CE, and commemorates the completion of the construction of a house or palace by the Himyarite regent 'Abd-Kulal and his family. A scanned picture of the inscriptions were first provided by Johannes H. Mordtmann and Eugen Mittwoch in their work Sabäische Inschriften. Rathjens-v. Wissmannsche Südarabischen-Reise. This inscription is also written in the Sabaic language and shows an instance of monotheism in pre-Islamic Arabia.

== Content ==
Albert W.F. Jamme decodes the inscription as:

ʿbdkllm w-s²ʿt-hw ʾbʿly bt ʾlh[... ... ... ...]— lʾn w-bny-hmy Hnʾm w-Hʿll ʾlht Qwlm b— rʾw w-hs²qrn bt-hmw Yrs³ b-rdʾ Rḥmnn w-brʾ-[h]— w b-wrḫ ḏ-ḫrf ḏ-l-ṯlṯt w-s¹bʿy w-ḫms¹ mʾtm ḥyw

A transliteration to English, as done by the Corpus of South Arabian Inscriptions, is presented as follows:

ʿbdkllm and his wife ʾbʿly, daughter of ʾlh[.... ]- and their sons Hnʾm and Hʿll of the clan of Qwlm (or, Fwlm) built and complete their house Yrs³ with the help of Rahmanan. He built it in the month of Ḫrf of the year five hundred and seventy-three (of the Himyarite calendar). Life!

== Dating ==
As stated in the inscription itself, it was written in the year 573 of the Himyarite calendar. This inscription may date back to somewhere in the 5th century CE, which is where the Himyarite chief 'Abd-Kulal was most active as a governor and later a regent.

== Interpretation and significance ==
The inscription describes a man named ‘bdkllm and his family, a wife and two sons, celebrating the completion of the construction of a house or palace known as Yrs³. The figure ‘bdkllm in the inscription was first identified by Albert W.F. Jamme as the Himyarite regent ruler 'Abd-Kulal. The man and his family are seen invoking the god Rahmanan as having helped them with their residence's construction which is an indication that the religion of this family is monotheistic in nature.

The first pictures of this inscription were taken by Johannes H. Mordtmann and Eugen Mittwoch, subsequently published in their work Sabäische Inschriften. Rathjens-v. Wissmannsche Südarabischen-Reise.

== See also ==
- Monotheism in pre-Islamic Arabia
- Jabal Dabub inscription
- Ri al-Zallalah inscription
