= Elaea =

Elaea (Greek: Ελαία) can refer to any of several different items in ancient geography.

== Cities and towns ==
- Elaea (Aeolis), port of Pergamum, now near Zeytindağ, İzmir Province, Turkey
- Elaea (Aethiopia), port in ancient Aethiopia
- Elaea (Bithynia), port in ancient Bithynia
- Elaea (Epirus), chief city of Elaeatis in Epirus at the mouth of the Acheron
- Elaea (Lebanon), southeast of Sidon, Lebanon
- Elaia, Evros, a community of Nea Orestiada

== Promontories ==
- Elaea (promontory of Crete), near Palaikastro, in northeastern Crete, Greece
- Elaea (promontory of Cyprus), in Cyprus

== Other ==
- Elaea (river), in Boeotia, Greece
- Elaea (mythology), a figure in Greek mythology
- Elaea (mantis), an insect genus in the subfamily Gonypetinae
- Elaea (island), one of the Demonisi group, in Bithynia, now in Turkey
