= Dumat al-Jandal inscription =

The Dūmat al-Jandal inscription (also known as the Dūmat al Ğandal inscription, DaJ144PAr1, or DaJ144DA 1) is an Arabic Christian graffito written in the Paleo-Arabic script, and discovered at the Arabian site of Dumat al-Jandal. It was carved into the middle-left of a sandstone bolder, above a Nabataean Arabic inscription found a little lower. The rock also contains drawings of four female camels, one male camel, and an ibex.

It was first published in 2017 alongside seventeen Nabataean Arabic inscriptions.

== Date ==
This inscription dates to 548/9 AD according to the Gregorian calendar (though the date is given as 443 in the inscription according to the Bostran calendar whose first year corresponds to the year of the creation of the Roman province of Arabia Petraea), making it the first paleo-Arabic inscription from northwestern Arabia that can be precisely dated to the sixth century.

== Christian features ==
As with other Paleo-Arabic Christian inscriptions, the divine epithet ʾl-ʾlh, then a Christian expression, is used to refer to God. Christians may have continued to use this uncontracted form as an isomorphism for the Greek expression ho theos, which is how the Hebrew ʾĕlōhîm is rendered in the Septuagint. The inscription contains an inscribed cross, such as in some of the Hima Paleo-Arabic inscriptions. Furthermore, it makes use of the formula "May God remember" (ḏakara al‐Ilāh). Two other Paleo-Arabic inscriptions which use this formula include the Zabad inscription and the Yazid inscription.

== Naming/itemization ==
The inscription has been also named/itemized as DaJ144PAr1:

- DaJ = Dumat al-Jandal
- DaJ144 is the excavation site in Dumat al-Jandal where the inscription was found
- PAr = Paleo-Arabic

== Text ==
Transliteration

dkr

dkr ʾl-ʾlh

ḥgʿ{b/n}w br

šlmh

{b}y{r}[ḥ] šnt 4×100

+20+20+3 cross

Translation

May be remembered. May God remember Ḥgʿ{b/n}w son of Salama/Sa-lāma/Salima {in} the m[onth] (gap) year 443 [AD 548/549].

== See also ==
- Hima Paleo-Arabic inscriptions
- Pre-Islamic Arabian inscriptions
- Yazid inscription
