= Paleo-Arabic =

Writing script

Text of the Zabad inscription: May [the Christian] God be mindful of Sirgu son of Abd-Manafu and Ha{l/n}i son of Mara al-Qays and Sirgu son of Sadu and Syrw and S{.}ygw.

Paleo-Arabic (or Palaeo-Arabic, previously called pre-Islamic Arabic or Old Arabic) was a pre-Islamic script used to write Arabic in the period of late antique Arabia. Used between the fifth and seventh centuries, it evolved out of the Nabataeo-Arabic script, and was superseded by the standardized Arabic that developed in the Islamic era. The phrase "Paleo-Arabic" was first coined by Christian Robin in its French form, paléo-arabe.

Paleo-Arabic was first documented in inscriptions in Syria and Jordan, but has since been found in Western Arabia (the Hejaz), where over fifty Paleo-Arabic inscriptions have now been found, and in South Arabia. The only god mentioned in these inscriptions is Allah. These inscriptions are always Christian when more detailed religious information is available, a finding that is considered informative for understanding the religious history of late pre-Islamic Arabia.

Paleo-Arabic inscriptions are publicly uploaded to the DiCoNab database.

== Linguistics ==
=== Distinguishing features ===
Paleo-Arabic refers to the Arabic script in the centuries prior to the standardization Arabic underwent in the Islamic era. According to Ahmad Al-Jallad and Hythem Sidky, Paleo-Arabic can be distinguished from the script that occurs in later periods by a number of orthographic features, including:

- Wawation (the addition of a seemingly superfluous waw (و) to the end of nouns)
- Use of Arameograms, i.e. fossilized Aramaic forms of Arabic words such as Aramaic br for Arabic bn ('son') or Aramaic ’nh for Arabic ’na ('I; me')
- Absence of ʾalif ( ا ) to represent the long ā
- Occasional phonetic spelling of the definite article, i.e. eye spelling of al (ال) to match assimilated sun letters instead of retaining the lam.
- Occasional use of dots to distinguish the dāl (د) from rē (ر) as a relic from the Syriac script

=== Categories ===
Known Paleo-Arabic inscriptions fall into one of three categories:

- simple signatures with no confessional statements
- monotheist invocations
- specifically Christian texts

=== Introductory formulae ===
The present corpus of Paleo-Arabic inscriptions attests the following introductory formulae:

- b-sm-k rb-nʾ / In your name, our lord
- brk-[k]m rb-nʾ / May our lord bless you
- b-sm-k ʾllhm / In your name, O God

=== Spelling of "God" ===
Paleo-Arabic inscriptions most commonly refer to "God" as al-ʾilāh or by its orthographic variant illāh, though the term Rabb for "Lord" also appears as is seen in the Abd Shams inscription, Jabal Dabub inscription, and the Ri al-Zallalah inscription.

== Religion ==
Christian authors wrote Paleo-Arabic inscriptions found in Syria, Jordan, Saudi Arabia, and South Arabia. According to Ahmad Al-Jallad and Hythem Sidky, all known Paleo-Arabic inscriptions are monotheistic (that is, they all only mention the one, same God) and, when it is possible to specify further, Christian. As such, they reflect the dominance attained by the spread of monotheism in pre-Islamic Arabia from the fourth to sixth centuries in the pre-Islamic period.

== Calendar ==
The Bostran era, whose starting point is equal to 106 AD in the Gregorian calendar, is used in the Dumat al-Jandal inscription, the Jebel Usays inscription, and the Hima Paleo-Arabic inscriptions. The Seleucid era is used in the Zabad inscription.

== List of Paleo-Arabic inscriptions ==
The current list of known Paleo-Arabic texts and inscriptions is given in a table and appendix of a paper jointly written by Ahmad Al-Jallad and Hythem Sidky.

Name	Location	Number of texts	Date	Publication
Zabad inscription	Zabad, Syria	1	512	
Jebel Usays inscription	Jebel Usays, Syria	1	528	
Harran inscription	Harran, Syria	1	562	
Umm al-Jimal Paleo-Arabic inscription	Umm el-Jimal, Jordan	1	undated	
Yazid inscription	Qasr Burqu, Jordan	1	undated	
Hima Paleo-Arabic inscriptions	Hima, Saudi Arabia	25	470, 513	
Ri al-Zallalah inscription	Ri al-Zallalah, Saudi Arabia	1	undated	
None	Medina, Saudi Arabia	2	undated	Unpublished but see
Umm Burayrah (Abd Shams) inscription	Northwest Hejaz, Saudi Arabia	9 + 2	undated	
Dumat al-Jandal inscription	Dumat al-Jandal, Saudi Arabia	2	548	

== See also ==
- Namara inscription
- Old Arabic
- Safaitic
