= Umm Burayrah inscription =

The Umm Burayrah inscription (also known as the Abd Shams inscription) is a Paleo-Arabic inscription discovered in the Tabuk Province of northwestern Saudi Arabia. Among Paleo-Arabic inscriptions it contains a unique invocation formula, a prayer for forgiveness, and the personal name ʿAbd Shams (ʿAbd Šams). It was originally photographed and published by Muhammed Abdul Nayeem in 2000, and was recently redocumented by the amateur archaeologist Saleh al‐Hwaiti.

Though no date is found on the inscription, one proposal places it in the late sixth or early seventh century.

== Text ==
The following transliteration and translation comes from the 2023 edition of the inscription. The text can be divided into three parts: the opening formula, the personal pronoun "I" (anā) plus the personal name, and the closing formula.

Vocalized transliteration

bi‐smika Allāhumma anā ʿAbd Šams br al‐Muġīrah, yastaġfir Rabbahu

Translation

In your name, God, I, ʿAbd Šams, son of al‐Muġīrah, seek forgiveness from my Lord.

== Monotheism ==
The inscription is certainly monotheistic, calling for ʾistiġfār (the seeking of forgiveness) unattested in prior inscriptions and the use of rabb as a title for the deity Allāh. The use of the title rabb for the one monotheistic God is also found in two other Paleo-Arabic inscriptions: the Jabal Dabub inscription and the Ri al-Zallalah inscription. The inscription may be Jewish, although the absence of Christian symbolism (like a cross) speaks against it being Christian.

== Abd Shams ==
Although the name ʿAbd Šams was common in pre-Islamic Arabia, an individual named Abd Šams who is the son of another figure named al‐Muġīrah is less common, although two Islamic-era sources describe a figure by this name and genealogy from the Quraysh tribe: (1) ʿAbd Šams, son of ʿAbd Manīf, son of Quṣayy, son of Kilāb and (2) ʿAbd Šams, son of al‐ Muġīrah, was the son of ʿAbd Allāh, son of ʿUmar, son of Maḫzūm. Of the two, the latter is a likelier candidate for the ʿAbd Shams of the inscription as he was a contemporary of Muhammad. It is also possible that the figure in the inscription is unattested elsewhere in the historical record.

== Linguistics ==
The inscription contains the vocative form Aḷḷāhumma اللهم including the lām. This is also known from one other inscription: FaS 4a.

== See also ==
- Umm al-Jimal Paleo-Arabic inscription
- Jebel Usays inscription
