= Arabia in late antiquity =

History of Arabia from the third to seventh centuries CE

Arabia in late antiquity refers to the history of the Arabian Peninsula and its northern desert frontiers between roughly the third and seventh centuries CE. During this period, Arabia stood between the Roman or Byzantine, Sasanian, and Aksumite empires, while also containing independent kingdoms, oasis communities, nomadic and semi-nomadic groups, and long-distance commercial and religious networks. Modern scholarship increasingly treats the Arabian Peninsula not as an isolated setting for the later emergence of Islam, but as a region participating in the wider political, religious, linguistic, and economic transformations of late antiquity.

The period saw major changes in political organization and religious culture. In South Arabia, the kingdom of Himyar unified much of Yemen, adopted a monotheistic royal ideology, had confrontations with the Kingdom of Aksum, and eventually came under Aksumite and then Sasanian rule. In the north, Arab federations and ruling families such as the Jafnids and Nasrids operated between the Roman and Sasanian empires. In northwestern and western Arabia, inscriptions and archaeology show the development of Arabic writing, the persistence and transformation of older cults, Jewish and Christian presences in several regions, and a growing public language of monotheistic devotion.

By the sixth and early seventh centuries, Arabia was marked by change and discontinuity. Political fragmentation, changing trends in religious demographics and settlement patterns, and the involvement of foreign emipres, particularly the Byzantines and Sasanians, formed the background for the emergence of the first Islamic state in the time of Muhammad in the Hejaz and the subsequent early Muslim conquests.

== Terminology and scope ==
"Arabia" did not have a single fixed political meaning in antiquity. Greek, Latin, Syriac, South Arabian, Persian, and Arabic sources used different labels for the peninsula, its deserts, its frontier provinces, and its peoples. Roman usage included Arabia Petraea, the province created after the annexation of the Nabataean kingdom in 106 CE, while Greek and Latin geographers also distinguished regions such as Arabia Deserta and Arabia Felix. South Arabian inscriptions used their own political geography, and late antique authors often described Arab groups according to imperial alliances, tribal names, dynasties, or settlement zones rather than a single Arabian identity.

Historians debate precisely when the phase of "late antique Arabia" begins and ends. The terminology relates to the broader periodization of late antiquity, popularized in Peter Brown's book The World of Late Antiquity (1971). The third century is usually taken as the starting point, when the eastern frontier of the Roman Empire is transformed as the Persian world comes under the rule of the Sasanians, who ousted the Parthians, the previous ruling dynasty. Around the same time, Himyar succeeds in unifying South Arabia into a single state. The endpoint is usually placed in the seventh century, with the rise of Islam and the early Muslim conquests and the subsequent impact of these events on the Near East. However, some historians argue that late antiquity extended well into the seventh and eighth centuries, as the Umayyad period saw great continuity with late antique institutions including art, religion and religious debate, and in how the empires functioned.

== Sources and evidence ==
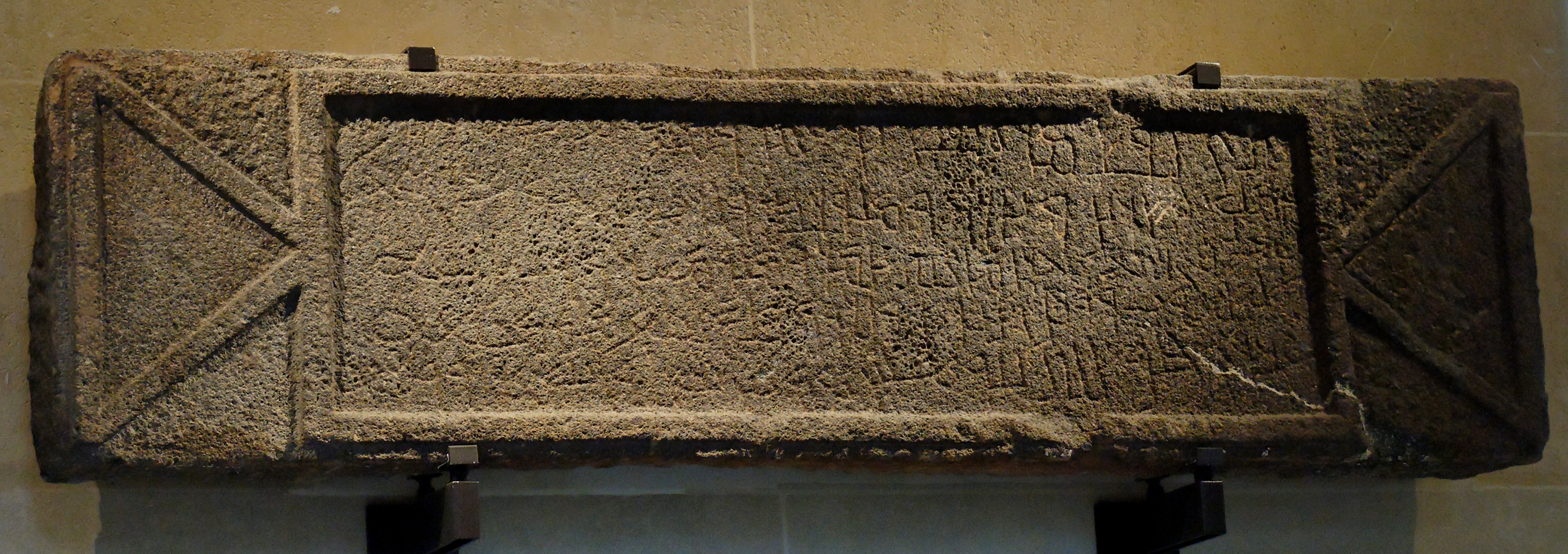
The Namara inscription, dated to 328 CE, an important early Arabic inscription from the northern Arabian frontier.

The study of late antique Arabia depends on several uneven bodies of evidence. Epigraphy is especially important because thousands of inscriptions and graffiti survive in South Arabian, Ancient North Arabian, Nabataean, Nabataeo-Arabic, Greek, Syriac, and early Arabic scripts. These inscriptions record royal statements, dedications, invocations, building works, personal names, tribal affiliations, dates, and religious formulae. They are often closer in time to the events they describe than later Arabic historiography, but they are also geographically uneven and often brief.

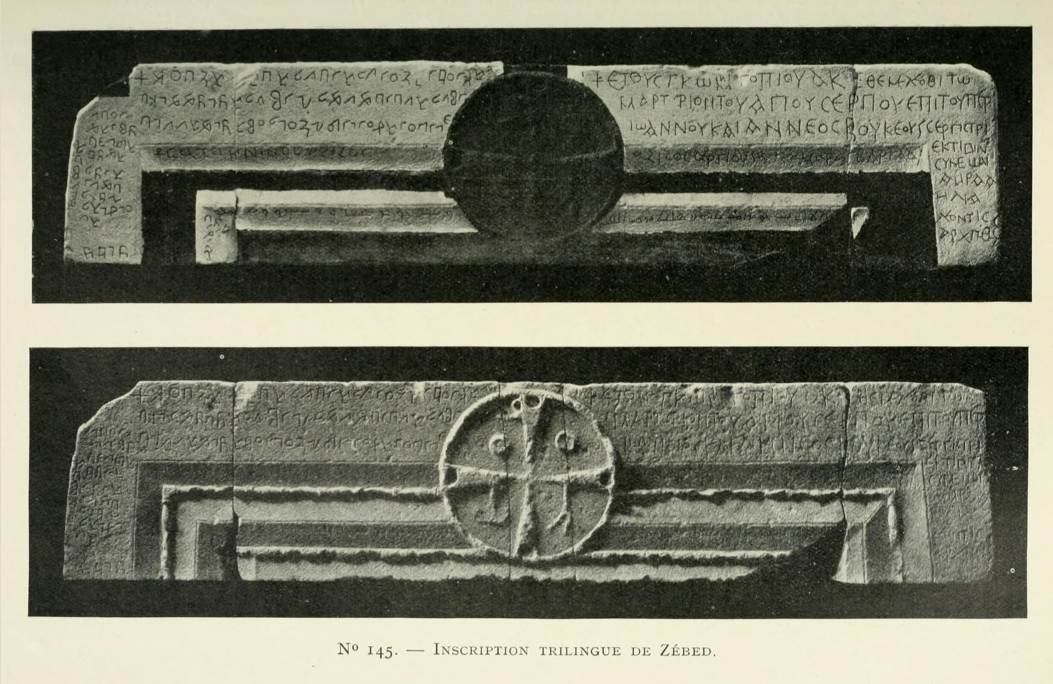
The Zabad inscription of 512 CE, with Greek, Syriac, and Arabic text.

Northwestern Arabian inscriptions are central to reconstructing the transition from Nabataean Aramaic to Arabic writing which, in its late antique form, is known as Paleo-Arabic. Laila Nehme distinguishes Nabataean inscriptions from the first century BCE to the mid-third century CE, Nabataeo-Arabic inscriptions from the late third to mid-fifth centuries, and pre-Islamic Arabic inscriptions from the late fifth and sixth centuries. The same material also traces changes in religious vocabulary, including a reduced number of named divine figures in the later inscriptions.

Archaeology has become increasingly important for regions that were long known mainly from literary traditions. Excavations in Wadi al-Qura at Al-Ula have identified a late antique village south of ancient Dadan, with a large building constructed in the late third or early fourth century and used into the first half of the seventh century. The site provides rare evidence for settlement, agriculture, diet, and possible religious identity in northwestern Arabia during a period previously described as archaeologically obscure.

Later Islamic historical, genealogical, and biographical traditions preserve much information about pre-Islamic Arabia, but they were written down generations after the events they describe and must be used critically. The Quran is contemporary or near-contemporary evidence for the religious language of Muhammad's community, though it is not a narrative history of Arabia. Pre-Islamic Arabic poetry is another important but difficult source: it preserves social ideals, memory, and elite self-presentation, but the dating and transmission of individual poems remain debated.

== Geography and environment ==
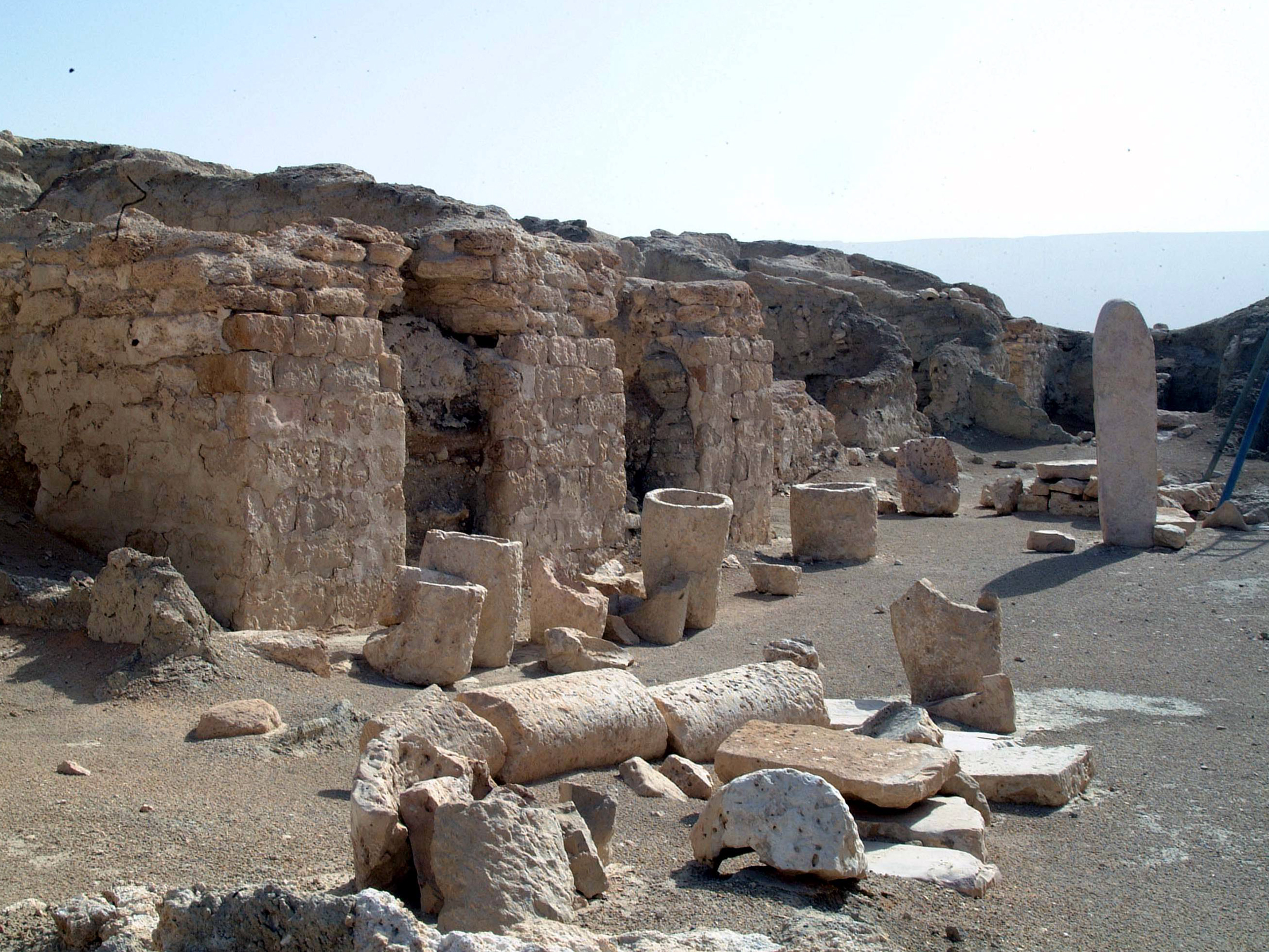
The archaeological site of Qaryat al-Faw, an important settlement on inland Arabian trade routes.

Arabia's late antique history was shaped by ecological diversity. The peninsula included the irrigated highlands of Yemen, the Red Sea and Arabian Sea coasts, oasis cities such as Tayma, Al-Ula, Khaybar, and Yathrib (Medina), the caravan and pastoral zones of northern and central Arabia, and the Gulf littoral of eastern Arabia. Rainfall, groundwater, wadis, and irrigation systems determined the viability of settlement and agriculture.

South Arabia was especially dependent on water management. Himyarite power rested partly on irrigated and rain-fed agriculture, terraced fields, and the maintenance of dams and water systems. A high-resolution hydroclimate study from northern Oman and related regional records indicates severe and persistent droughts in the early sixth century, especially between about 500 and 530 CE. This work argued that, while Himyar did not fall due to drought alone, major drought in this period heavily decremented the kingdom's resilience and ability to survive in the face of major, additional challenges, such as changing settlement patterns, as well as warfare with the Kingdom of Aksum.

== Political history ==
=== Northern Arabia and the empires ===
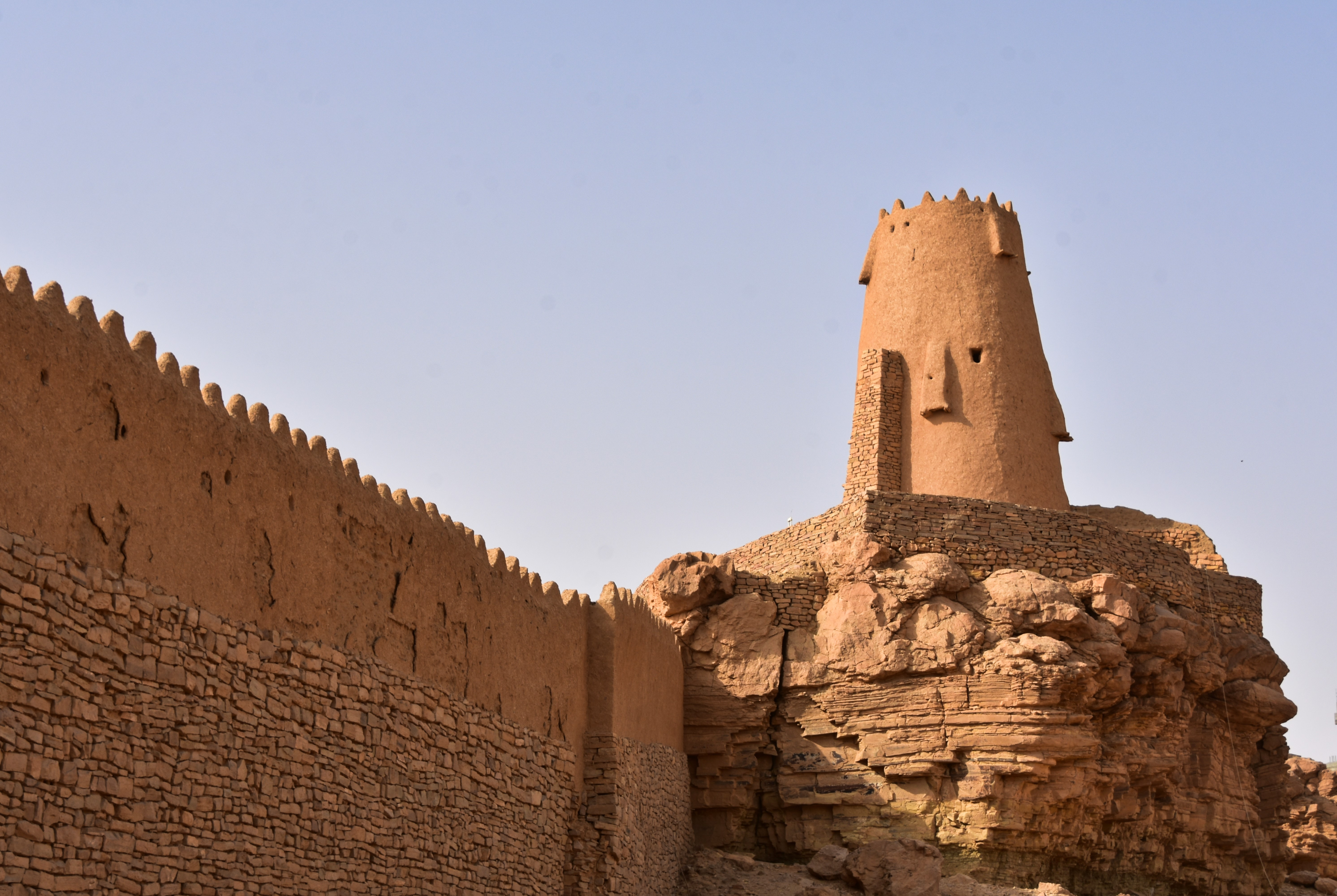
Marid Castle at Dumat al-Jandal, a major oasis settlement in northern Arabia.

Northern Arabia lay between Roman and Sasanian zones of influence. A major kingdom in this region, the Nabataean Kingdom, remained independent until its annexation by the Roman Empire in 106 CE during the reign of the emperor Trajan. Then, it came to be known as the province of Arabia Petraea. Nevertheless, some local Nabataean practices, including culture and script traditions, continued for centuries.

In the third to fifth centuries, Arab groups in the north found themselves closely engaged with nearby imperial frontiers, principally the Roman and Sasanian empires. Engagement occurred in terms of alliances and client states, patronage, diplomacy, and sometimes direct battle.

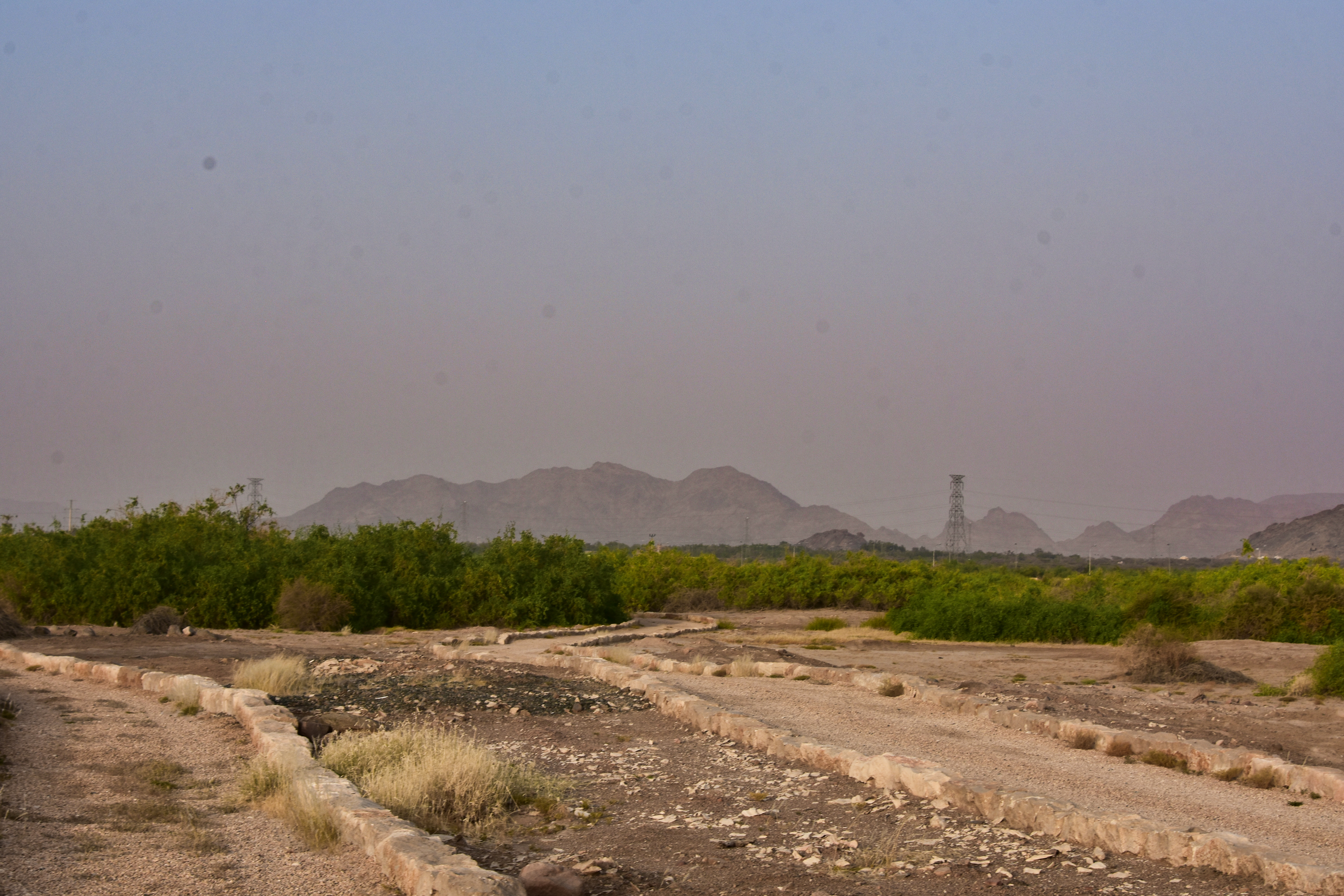
The archaeological site of Al-Ukhdud in Najran, a major oasis of southern Arabia.

By the sixth century, the Jafnids, often called "Ghassanids" in older scholarship, had become major Roman-allied Arab leaders in Syria and Arabia. Greg Fisher has argued that the power of the Jafnids grew in their alliance with the Romans, particularly through diplomacy and imperial patronage. The common religion between the two (Christianity) enabled for this alliance to develop. Their Sasanian-aligned counterparts, the Nasrids or Lakhmids of Al-Hira, played a comparable role on the eastern side of the frontier, though with different religious and political strategies. Nevertheless, these groups were not passive clients or subjects of empires. They had broad independent powers, and over the course of the sixth century, they created broad institutions of Arab political leadership before Islam, even though later Islamic memory reshaped their history.

=== Himyar and South Arabia ===
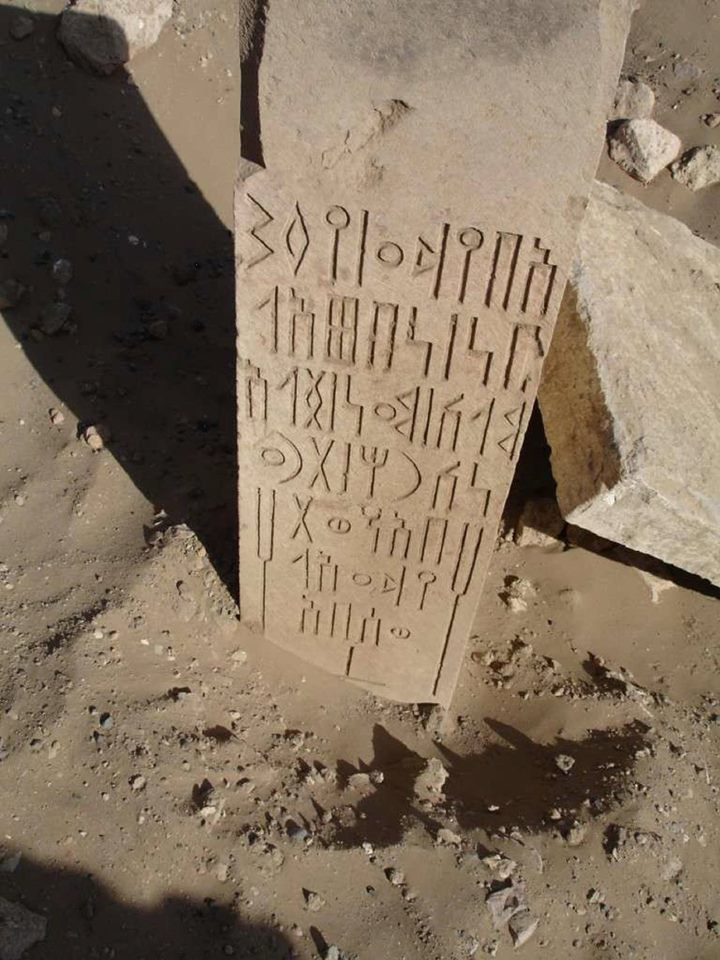
An inscription in the Ancient South Arabian musnad script, used in South Arabian epigraphy.

In South Arabia, Himyar emerged as the dominant kingdom from the late third century CE. It conquered Saba around 275 and Hadhramaut around 300, creating a unified South Arabian kingdom whose rulers styled themselves "kings of Sabaʾ, dhu-Raydan, Ḥaḍramawt, and Yamnat" to emphasize their extensive ruler over a wide array of tribes and places. This unification had major ramifications across many spheres, including the political, linguistic, calendrical, and eventually religious, with Sabaic becoming the main written language of royal inscriptions.

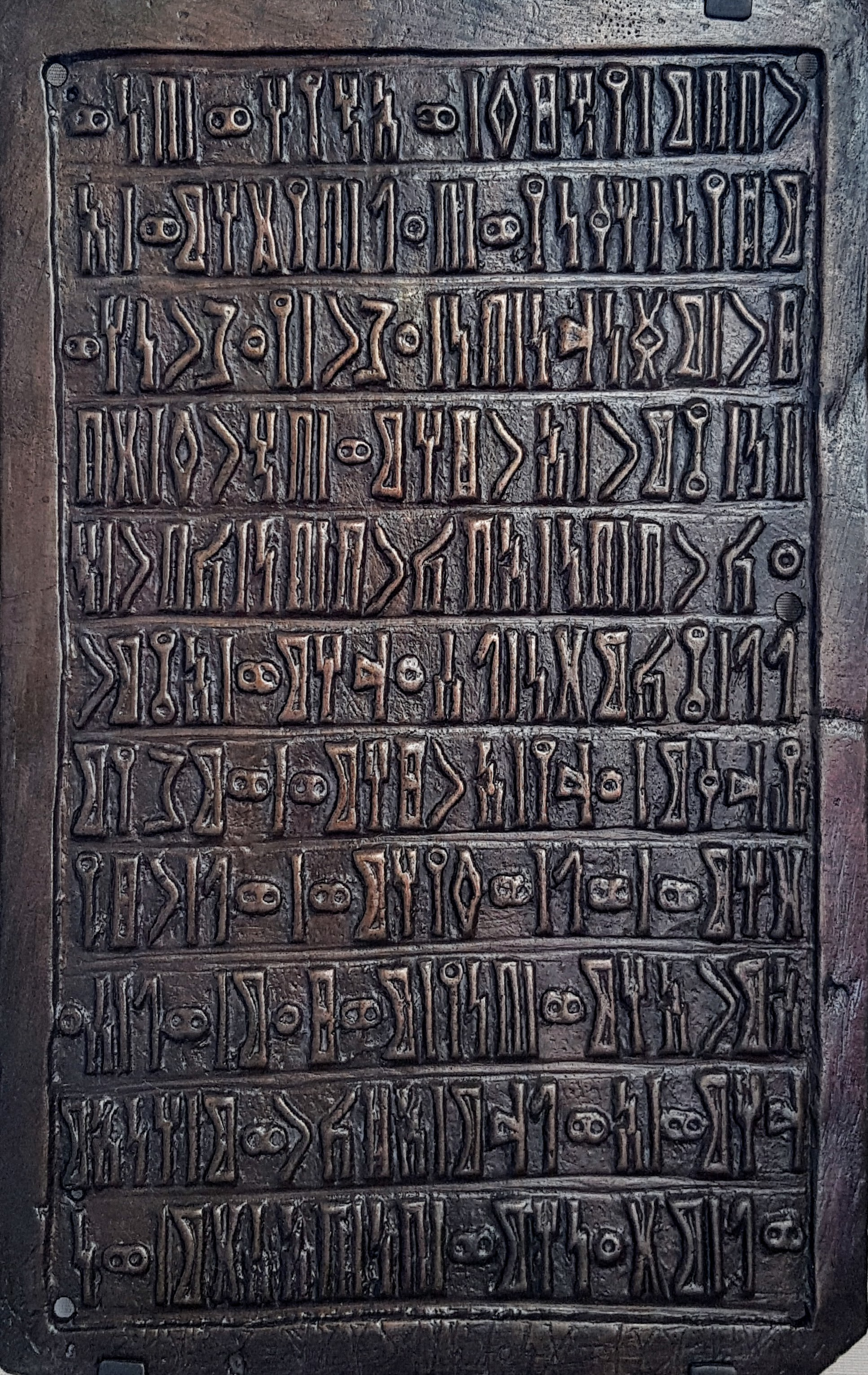
A Sabaic bronze plaque from Yemen, written in the Ancient South Arabian script.

Beginning in the late fourth century, royal inscriptions from Himyar abandon references to polytheism or the old polytheistic gods. Inscriptions begin to invoke the deity and one God Rahmanan, and new, traditionally Jewish titles begin to appear such as "Lord of Heaven" and the "God of Israel".

Himyar's territorial ambitions were not limited to South Arabia. In the fifth century, the kingdom exercised influence over large parts of central and western Arabia, including Kinda, Ma'add, Mudar, and other groups of Arabia Deserta. By around 500, Himyar's sphere reached deep into the central Arabian desert, and all the way up to the Roman and Sasanian frontiers.

=== Aksum and the Red Sea ===
The Red Sea linked South Arabia with Aksum, Egypt, the Byzantine empire, and Indian Ocean commerce. In the early sixth century, conflict between Jewish-aligned Himyarite rulers and Christian communities, especially at Najran, drew Aksum and Byzantium into South Arabian affairs. The Himyarite ruler Yūsuf Asʾar Yathʾar, known in later Arabic tradition as Dhu Nuwas, engaged in conflict with Aksumite forces and persecuted Christian communities. This provoked wider Christian outrage and became the subject of texts ranging from Jacob of Serugh's Letter to the Himyarites to Simeon of Beth Arsham's Letter on the Himyarite Martyrs. The Christian Ethiopian kingdom of Aksum ultimately responded with a major invasion in 525, after which independent Himyarite power came to an end.

Soon after Aksum annexed South Arabia, the Ethiopian general Abraha seized power and became the dominant figure in the region in the mid-sixth century. He wrote several monumental inscriptions that have survived, and which connect him with extensive military campaigns, construction of infrastructure, and the engagement of diplomatic relations with other powers in the Peninsula and with the surrounding empires. One famous inscription documenting much of this is known as CIH 541, dated to 548 CE, which runs for 136 lines. The chronology and interpretation of Abraha's career remain debated, but his kingdom shows South Arabia's continued importance in Red Sea and imperial politics on the eve of Islam.

=== East Arabia and the Gulf ===
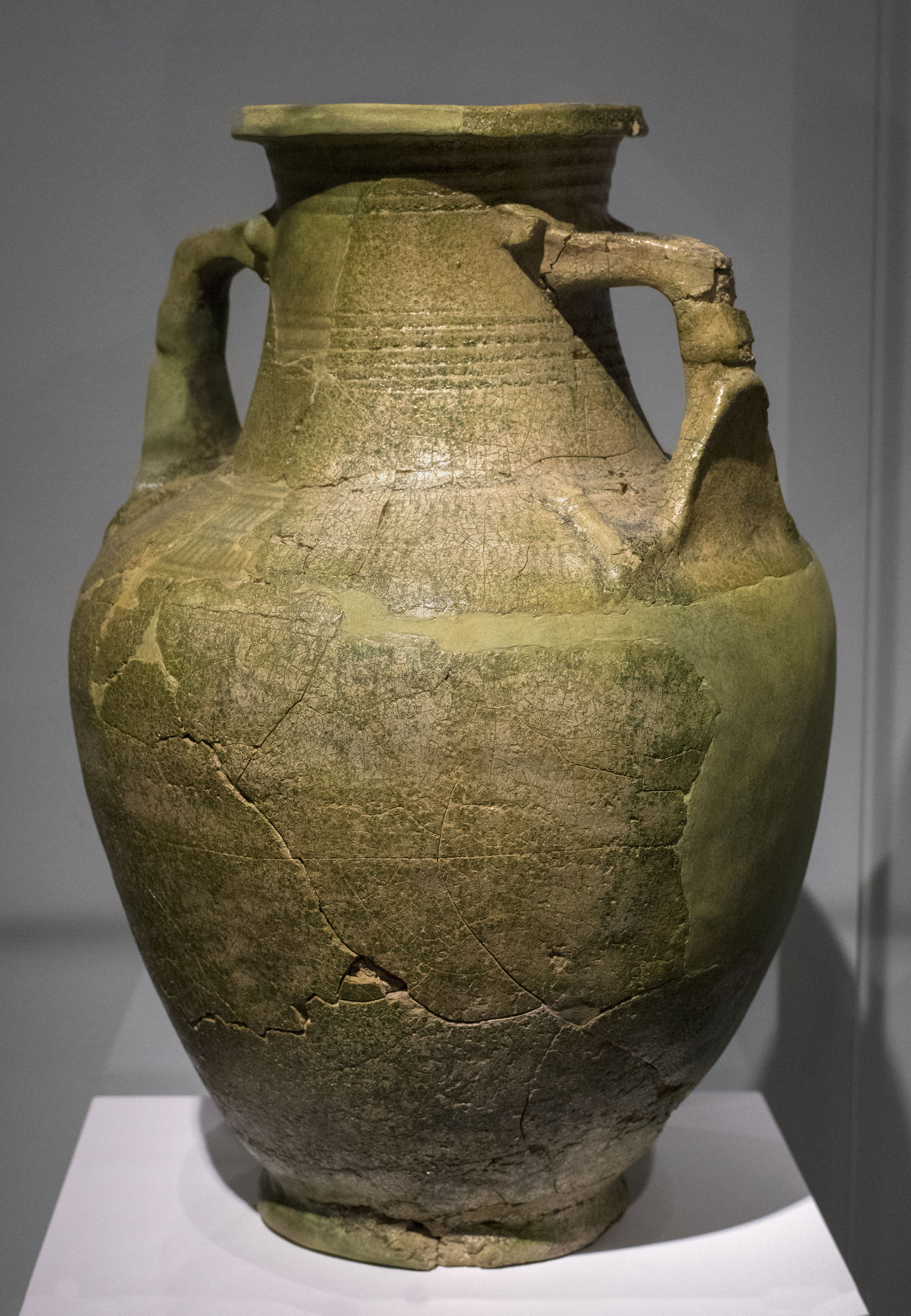
A glazed clay pitcher from Mleiha, reflecting the material culture of eastern Arabia and the Gulf.

Eastern Arabia was closely tied with the Gulf region and the Sasanian Empire across the Persian Gulf. Religiously, the Church of the East gained considerable local and institutional sway in the region during the sixth century. Christian occupation and institutional life did not immediately come to an end after the early Islamic conquests. East Syrian Christianity became especially visible in the sixth to eighth centuries from an archaeological perspective, particularly through the growth of monasticism and the documentation of newly found monasteries in this area. Examples include the monasteries that have been found at al-Qusur on Failaka, Kharg Island, Sir Bani Yas, and Siniyah Island.

== Society and economy ==
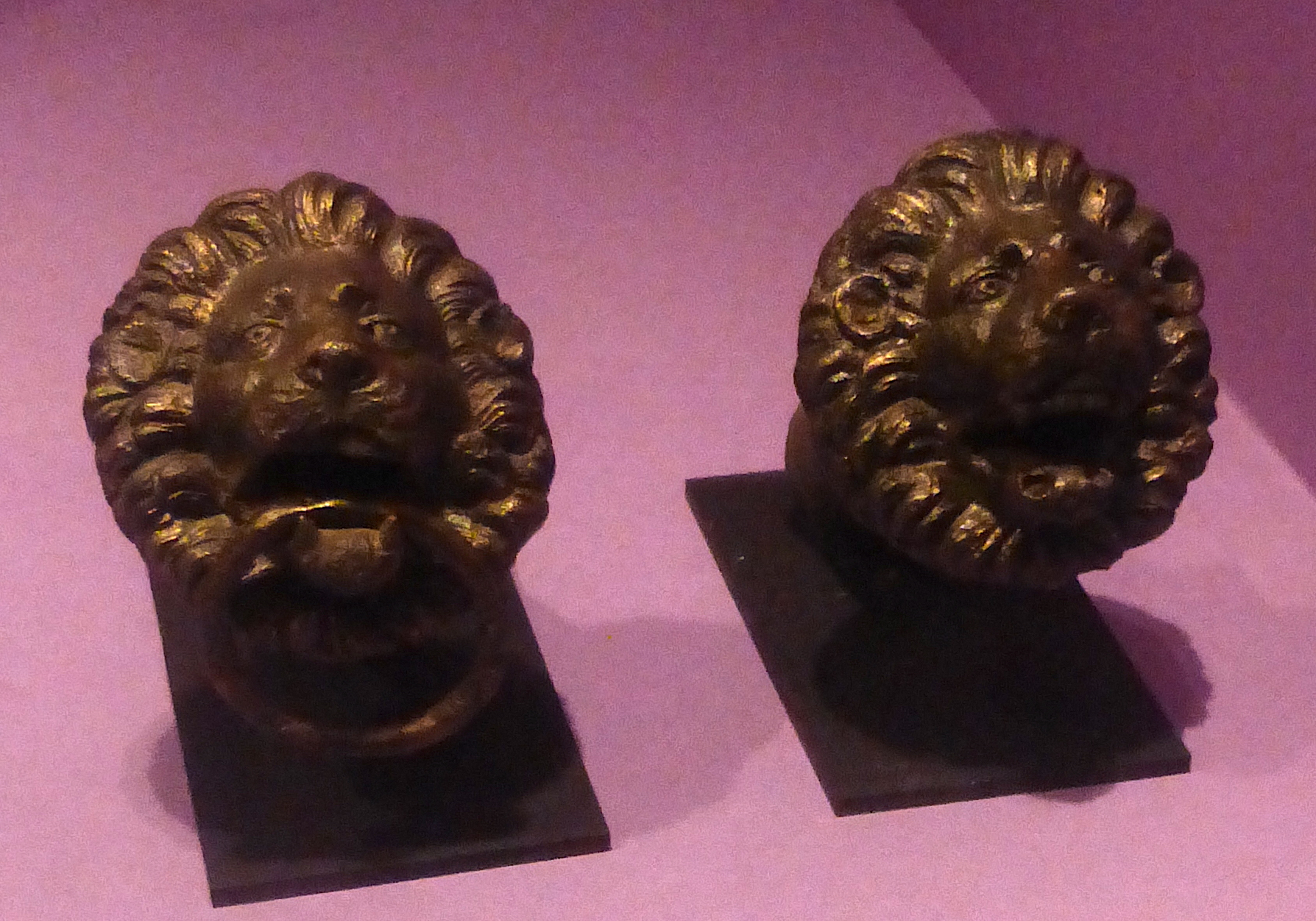
Bronze lion-head door knockers from Qaryat al-Faw, reflecting the prosperity and cosmopolitan material culture of inland Arabia.

Late antique Arabian society included sedentary agriculturalists, oasis dwellers, merchants, pastoralists, soldiers, royal elites, and mobile tribal groups. Arabia was integrated into the surrounding world through trade routes, which reached Syria, Iraq, Egypt, the Horn of Africa, Iran, and even the Indian Ocean. For this reason, historians no longer accept older models which posited Arabia as culturally empty or isolated before Islam. Instead, Arabia was societally and economically integrated into the broader Mediterranean and Near Eastern landscapes.

Non-sedentary (including mobile and semi-mobile groups) were also central to Arabian society. They played a wide range of roles: they controlled trade routes, they negotiated their military services to surrounding kingdoms and empires, they conduct raids or, conversely, they serviced protection of travelling caravans from raids.

Over the course of time, late antique Arab leaders were capable of achieving increasingly greater authority and status on the international stage. Means to achieving this included warfare, imperial and religious recognition and patronage, and direct control over steppes, oases, and settled areas.

== Religion ==
=== Polytheism, Allah, and monotheistic piety ===
Religion in late antique Arabia underwent a dramatic transformation. Until the fifth century, Arabian inscriptions continue to evoke pagan deities. In its latest phase, pagan northwest Arabian inscriptions primarily invoke gods such as Allat, Al-Uzza, Manat, Dushara, and regional gods appear in earlier phases. However, in the fifth or sixth centuries, a marked shift occurs and Allah (or in its uncontracted form, al-Ilāh) becomes the sole recipient of invocation, including in requests forgiveness and for blessings on the believer. Thus, a monotheistic-sounding piety gained precedence in the second half of Arabia's late antique period.

In specific, Ahmad Al-Jallad and Hythem Sidky have argued that the Paleo-Arabic inscriptions of the late fifth to early seventh centuries reflect a "revolution in invocational language". That is to say, the older gods largely disappear from public inscriptions, while Allah becomes the sole or dominant object of prayer. They interpret this not as straightforward conversion to Judaism or Christianity, but as the transformation of ancestral Arabian religion under a wider late antique monotheistic climate.

=== Judaism ===
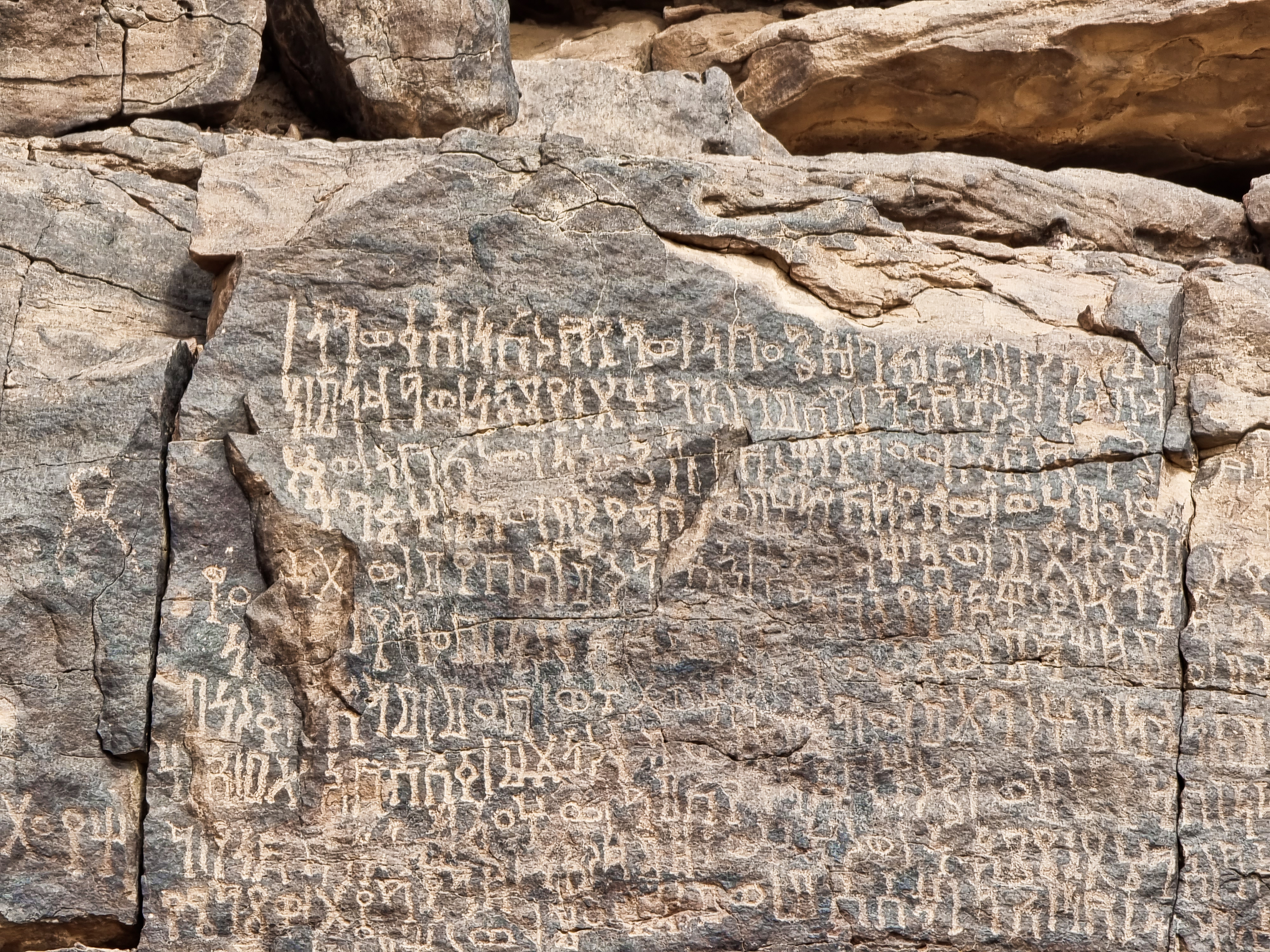
Part of an inscription associated with Dhu Nuwas near Najran.

Jewish communities and Jewish-oriented monotheisms are well attested in late antique Arabia, especially in South Arabia and the northwestern oases of the Hejaz such as Tayma, Khaybar, Yathrib, and Wadi al-Qura. In Himyar, inscriptions referring to Israel, the Lord of Heaven, and Jewish communal institutions show that Judaism or a Judaism-inspired royal monotheism became politically important from the late fourth century onward. These findings have recently been supported by new archaeological evidence from the northwestern oases at Dadan.

=== Christianity and monasticism ===
Christianity was present in several Arabian regions: South Arabia (especially Najran), the spheres of influence of the Jafnids and the Nasdrids (such as Al-Hira), Eastern Arabia and the Gulf, and some sites in northwestern Arabia. Christianity manifested in many different forms throughout these regions, such as through Roman and Ethiopian (Aksuimte) expressions, through the institutional organization of the Church of the East in Eastern Arabia and the gulf, and through local elites and local interactions with missionaries (such as from the Syriac-speaking world).

Kilwa, northeast of Tabuk, provides archaeological evidence for Christian monasticism in northwestern Arabia. In this region, architecture and inscriptions discovered at Kilwa demonstrate the presence of a monastery and monastic cells. Inscribed crosses have been found on the site's lintels. Architecturally, the buildings at Kilwa have resemblances to monasteries previously known from southern Syria and the northern Jordan.

In eastern Arabia, monasteries were part of the Church of the East's late Sasanian and early Islamic presence. Christian communities in East Arabia were able to survive into the post-Islamic period, and flourished until the mid-eighth century, around when a marked decline began.

== Writing, languages, and literature ==
Late antique Arabia was a home of numerous languages and writing scripts. For example, inscriptions from South Arabia used the Ancient South Arabian script and Sabaic language. In the north, varieties of the Ancient North Arabian script was used. The Nabataean script continued to be used after the fall of the Nabataean kingdom, but underwent a series of transitions into Nabataean Aramaic, Nabataeo-Arabic, and finally, it evolved into the modern Arabic script, whose pre-Islamic form is called Paleo-Arabic. On a more infrequent basis, there is also attested uses of Greek, Latin, Ethiopic, and Syriac.

Pre-Islamic Arabic poetry has also been argued to have shared in the wider cultural trends of the period of late antiquity in the Mediterranean and the Near East. The poetry attributed to Imru' al-Qays, especially the rāʾiyya, demonstrates that the poetic culture of Arabia was in close contact with the Byzantine world, while promoting themes of heroism and desert life.

== The Hejaz and the emergence of Islam ==
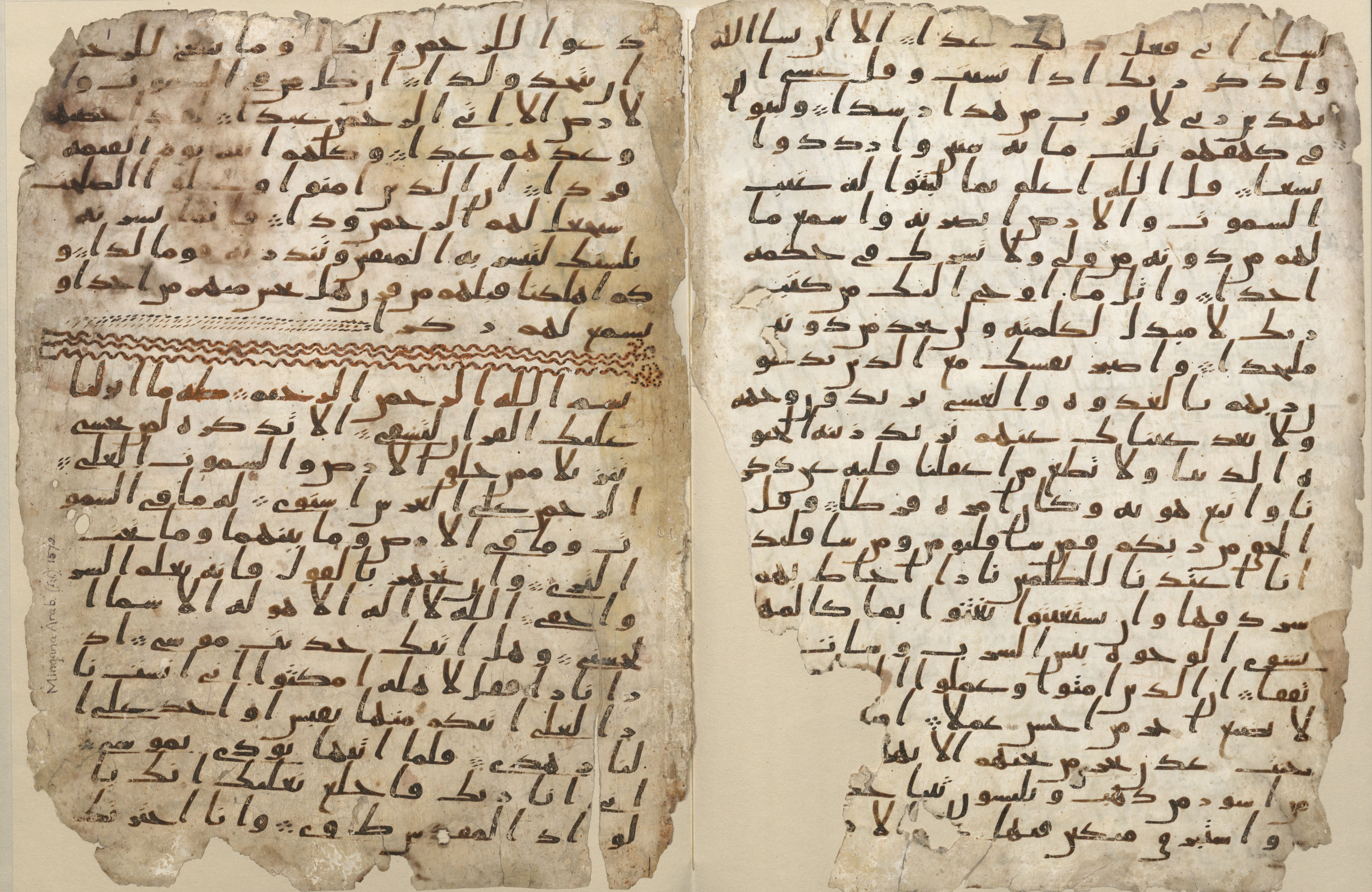
The Birmingham Quran manuscript, written in Hejazi script on parchment radiocarbon-dated to the seventh century.

The Hejaz is difficult to reconstruct archaeologically and epigraphically because systematic work around Mecca and Medina has not been done, and due to the loss of information over time. For this reason, many different forms of evidence have been combined in recent years to make headway into understanding the pre-Islamic history of the Hejaz, including: the Quran, a growing body of Hejazi inscriptions, inscriptions from surrounding regions, historical kernels that may be found in later Islamic traditions, poetry, and comparative archaeological evidence from nearby regions.

The religious language of the Quran presupposes debates with Jews, Christians, and other monotheists, while also confronting opponents described as "associators" and disbelievers. In other words, the environment of the Quran reflected an intersection of monotheistic, biblical, and older Arabian cultural and religious trends.

The emergence of Islam also occurred after the weakening or collapse of the earlier major Arabian powers including the Jafnids, Nasrids, and Himyar. At the same time, the imperial frontier was being greatly destabilized by the Byzantine-Sasanian wars of 602-628, making room for the rise of Muhammad's polity first in Medina, and then outwards.

== Historiography ==
Older scholarship often treated pre-Islamic Arabia as marginal, culturally poor, or mainly important as the background to Islam. Barbara Finster noted that architectural and archaeological evidence had already undermined the claim that Arabia possessed little culture or architecture before Islam. More recent work has gone further by integrating inscriptions, archaeology, climate records, and regional histories into a broader account of Arabia's late antique transformations.

The phrase "Islamic Late Antiquity" has also become increasingly common, but it remains debated. For Arabia, the value of the framework lies in showing that the peninsula participated in the same broad transformations as neighboring regions, while still preserving regional patterns of language, ecology, politics, and religious practice.

== See also ==
- Prehistoric Arabia
- Arabia Petraea
- History of Yemen
- Lakhmids
- Himyarite Kingdom
- Religion in pre-Islamic Arabia
- Warfare in pre-Islamic Arabia
