= Harran inscription =

Harrān inscription
- Type: Bilingual Christian dedicatory inscription
- Material: Stone
- Writing: Greek; Paleo-Arabic
- Created: 567–568 AD
- Discovered: Harran, as-Suwayda, Syria
- Culture: Byzantine

The Harrān inscription (not to be confused with the Babylonian Harran Stela) is an Arabic-Greek bilingual Christian dedicatory at a martyrium in the Harran village, which is in the city of as-Suwayda (south of Damascus) in Syria. It dates to 567–568.

The inscription has one section in Greek and another in Paleo-Arabic and, while the content between the two overlaps, there are also substantial differences. The use of Arabic in the composition of inscription was probably important to the cultural identity of the authors, as otherwise Greek was the imperial language of the Byzantine Empire which controlled the region at the time.

== Text ==
The text that follows is from the translation of George Bevan.

=== Greek ===
Asaraël, son of Talemos, the phylarch founded this martyrion of St John in the first year of the indiction in year 463.112 May the writer be remembered

=== Arabic ===
1. Sharahil son of Zalim built this martyrion

2. [in] the year 463, after the rebellion [?]

3. of Khaybar

4. by one year

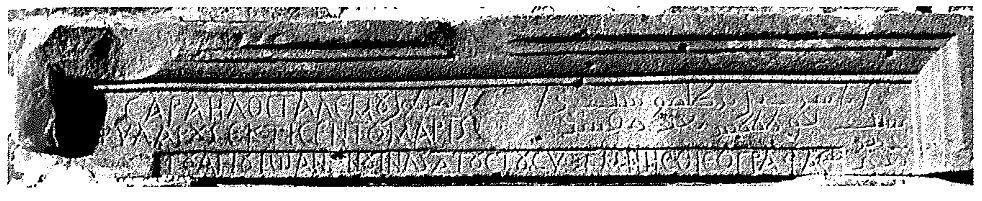
Harran inscription

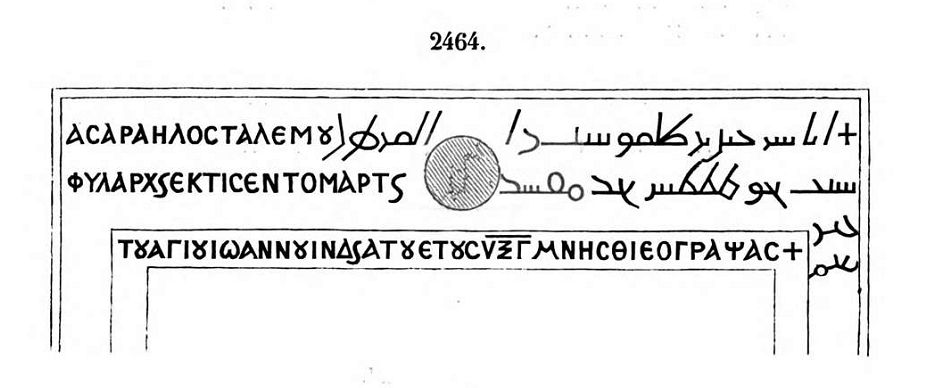
Text of the inscription

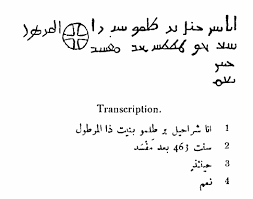
Text of the inscription in Arabic

== Description and interpretation ==
Two figures are named in the inscription: the constructor Sharahil ibn Zalim, who held the military title of phylarch, and Saint John, to whom the martyrium is dedicated to. The name srḥyl, which can either be interpreted as Šarāḥīl or Šarāḥʾil, also occurs in one other early Arabic inscription, found in a church in Knidos, Cyprus dating to the end of the seventh century. In the eighth century forwards, attestations of this name become more common. The Arabic portion of the inscription contains this information, with the addition that it was constructed one year after the "rebellion of Khaybar," little of which is known about aside from that it is also mentioned in the Kitāb al-maʿārif ("Book of Knowledge") of Ibn Qutaybah (828–889). Unlike the version in Ibn Qutayba, Michael MacDonald reads the inscription as indicating a rebellion on the part of Khaybar as opposed to an expedition.

== Linguistic environment ==
Alongside the Harran inscription, the only two other known uses of the Arabic script in Syria are the Zabad inscription and the Jabal Says inscription, which also date to the sixth century. Similar to the Harran inscription, the Zabad inscription also contains sections in both Greek and Arabic, and Syriac as well. This is contextualized in the intercommunications and exposure between Arabic, Greek, and Syrian communities in late antiquity.

== See also ==
- Zabad inscription
- Ri al-Zallalah inscription
- Martyrium
