= Umm al-Jimal Paleo-Arabic inscription =

Paleo-Arabic inscription

The Umm al-Jimāl inscription (or Umm al-Ǧimāl inscription) is an undated Paleo-Arabic inscription from Umm al-Jimal in the Hauran region of Jordan. It is located on the pillars base of a basalt slab in the northern part of the "Double Church" (so-named by the excavators) at the site of Umm al-Jimal and was partly covered with plaster on discovery.

The pre-Islamic inscription was discovered by the German orientalist Enno Littmann during the Princeton University Archaeological Expeditions to Syria. The discovery was announced in 1909, but it was not until 1929 that an edition of the text with a translation and commentary was published. In 1949, Littmann published the facsimile in his work Publications of the Princeton University Archaeological Expeditions to Syria in 1904–1905 and 1909. During the 1980s, the inscription was rediscovered and photographed by Geraldine King, but the inscription is hard to read from the photograph.

== Text ==
At least two published transliterations and translations of the inscription have been published over the years, including by Enno Littmann and James Bellamy. As the stone that the inscription was inscribed on is pitted and unsuitable for writing on, there is difficulty in reading the inscription and some believe that an entirely adequate reading cannot be accepted until new photographs are published.

Littmann's 1929 German translation

1. [O] Allāh, [gewähre] Verzeihung (Hilfe) dem ʾUlai,

2. dem Sohne des ʿUbaida, dem Schreiber

3. von al Hulaid (al-Habīr), des Vornehmsten der Banū

4. ʿAmr. Betet für ihn, [o] wer

5. es liest!

Littmann's 1949 modified English translation

1. God, [grant] pardon to ʾUlaih,

2. the son of ʿUbaid, the secretary

3. of al-ʿUbaid, the chief of the Banū

4. ʿAmr! May have [sic] notice of it he who

5. reads it!

Bellamy's 1988 transliteration

1. brzh ʿqdʾ l ʾlyh

2. br ʿbydh kʾtb

3. ʾljnyd ʾʿly tʾny

4. ʿmʾny ʿth ʿth mn

5. yymṣḥh

Bellamy's 1988 vocalized transliteration

1. barrazahu ʿuqadāʾu li-ʾUlayh

2. bar ʿUbaydah, kāʾtibi

3. ʾl-junaydi ʾaʿlā tāʾnī

4. ʿAmmānī ʿutiha ʿatha mman

5. yiʾamṣiḥhu

Bellamy's 1988 translation

1. This (inscription) was set up by colleagues of ʾUlayh

2. son of ʿUbaydah, secretary

3. of the cohort Augusta Secunda

4. Philadelphiana; may he go mad who

5. effaces it

== See also ==
- Hima Paleo-Arabic inscriptions
- Dumat al-Jandal inscription
