= Hima Paleo-Arabic inscriptions =

The Ḥimà Paleo-Arabic inscriptions are a group of twenty-five inscriptions discovered at Hima, 90 km north of Najran, in southern Saudi Arabia, written in the Paleo-Arabic script. These are among the broader group of inscriptions discovered in this region and were discovered during the Saudi-French epigraphic mission named the Mission archéologique franco-saoudienne de Najran. They were the first Paleo-Arabic inscriptions discovered in Saudi Arabia, before which examples had only been known from Syria. The inscriptions have substantially expanded the understanding of the evolution of the Arabic script.

== Date ==
While the majority of the Hima inscriptions do not carry an absolute date, some of them date either to 470 or 513 AD, which makes the former (Ḥimà- Sud Pal Ar 1) the earliest precisely dated Paleo-Arabic inscription.

== Interpretation and significance ==
Several of the Hima inscriptions are explicitly Christian, and the inscriptions appear to be the product of the activities of a Christian community, especially given their Christian decorative symbols like large and ornate crosses. The calendar used by which dates are referred to was the Bostran era, which begins at the equivalent of 106 AD in the Gregorian calendar in accordance with the date of the establishment of the Roman province of Arabia Petraea. The use of this calendar can also be seen in another Paleo-Arabic inscription, the Jebel Usays inscription. The choice of use of the Paleo-Arabic script may have been a conscious choice to align those individuals in the Najran area more closely with their co-religionists in the north, in opposition to the script in use in the Himyarite Kingdom. In addition, the use of the same script for the first time in both southern Arabia, northern Arabia, and Arabic-speaking regions of southern Syria alongside the declining use of Aramaic attests to a significant trend of cultural unification across the Arabs in the fifth and sixth centuries. This may have gone hand-in-hand with a progressive separation from the Roman Empire. Several of the names in the Hima inscriptions are clearly Himyarite, and others are clearly derived from names of figures in the Old Testament, such as Isaac and Moses.

== Use of divine epithets ==
Epithet	Numbers of appearances	Inscription
ʾlʾlh	1	Ḥimà-Sud PalAr 8
ʿbd-ʾlmšyḥ	1	Ḥimà-al-Musammāt PalAr 5
mrʾ-lqyš	2	Ḥimà-Sud PalAr 5, Ḥimà-Sud PalAr 8

== Naming/itemization ==
These twenty-five Paleo-Arabic inscriptions, alongside fourteen Sabaic inscriptions, were all published in 2014. The Paleo-Arabic inscriptions were itemized as Ḥimà-Sud PalAr 1–12, Ḥimà-Idhbāḥ PalAr 1–7, and Ḥimà-al-Musammāt PalAr 1–6. The Sabaic inscriptions were itemized as Bi᾿r Ḥimà Sab 1–5, Ḥimà-Sud Sab 1–4, and Ḥimà-al-Musammāt Sab 1–5. The prepositions Ḥimà-Sud, Ḥimà-Idhbāḥ, and Ḥimà-al-Musammāt specify the subregion in Hima that the inscriptions were found.

== Text ==
The only published edition of all the Hima Paleo-Arabic inscriptions only contains a translation into French.

=== Ḥimà-Sud PalAr 1 ===
Transliteration

1 Ṯwbn Mlkw

2 b-yrḥ brk

3 št 3x100

4 20+20+20+4

Translation

1 Thawbān (fils de) Mālik

2 Au mois de burak

3 de l’an 364

=== Ḥimà-Sud PalAr 2 ===
Transliteration

᾿sḥq br ῾mr

Translation

Isaac fils de ῾Āmir

=== Ḥimà-Sud PalAr 3 ===
Transliteration

1 ṯw ..

2 {Ḍm} Ṯwbn br

3 Mlkw

Translation

1 Croix (type 2) (Christian cross)

2 {Ḍamm} Thawbān fils de

3 Mālik

=== Ḥimà-Sud PalAr 4 ===
Transliteration

ṯw Ṯwbn br Mlk(w)

Translation

ṯw Thawbān fils de Mālik

=== Ḥimà-Sud PalAr 5 ===
Transliteration

1 Ṯwbn br Mlkw ktb

2 ᾿ly᾿ br Mr᾿lqys ktb

Translation

1 Thawbān fils de Mālik a écrit

2 Élie fils de Mar᾿ al-Qays a écrit

=== Ḥimà-Sud PalAr 6 ===
Transliteration

Ṯwbn bn Mlkw

Translation

Thawbān fils de Mālik

=== Ḥimà-Sud PalAr 7 ===
Transliteration

Ṯwbn br Mlkw

Translation

Thawbān fils de Mālik

Contains a large cross

=== Ḥimà-Sud PalAr 8 ===
Transliteration

1 Ṯwbn br Mrṯd

2 Rby῾h br Mwsy

3 Ṯwbn br Mrṯd

4 ᾿ly᾿ br Mr᾿lqys br Ty(m)w

5 ᾿l-᾿lh …

Translation

1 Thawbān fils de Marthad

2 Rabī῾a fils de Moïse

3 Thawbān fils de Marthad

4 Élie fils d’Imru᾿ al-Qays fils de Taym

5 Dieu…

Partial English translation

1 Ṯawbān son of Marṯad

5 Elie son of Imruʾ al-Qays son of Taymū

6 God ----

=== Ḥimà-Sud PalAr 9 ===
Transliteration

Ṯwbn br Mlkw

Translation

Thawbān fils de Mālik

=== Ḥimà-Sud PalAr 10 ===
Transliteration

1 M῾wyh

2 N῾mn br Mlk(.)w

3 …

4 Croix (type 3) (Ṯwbn) br Mrṯd ᾿l-᾿l(h)..

5 (l-)M῾wyh br ᾿l-Ḥrṯ

6 … … … (?)

7 … … … (?)

8 … … … (?)

Translation

1 Mu῾āwiya

2 Nu῾mān fils de Mālik

3 …

4 Croix (Christian cross) (type 3) (Thawbān) fils de Marthad al-Ilāh…

5 Mu῾āwiya fils d’al-Ḥārith

6 … … … (?)

7 … … … (?)

8 … … … (?)

=== Ḥimà-Sud PalAr 11 ===
Transliteration

(Mnd)rw br ᾿(l)-Ḥr)[ṯ]

Translation

Mundhir fils d’al-Ḥāri[th]

=== Ḥimà-Sud PalAr 12 ===
Transliteration

Ṯwbn br Mlkw

Translation

Thawbān fils de Mālik

=== Ḥimà-Idhbāḥ PalAr 1 ===
Transliteration

Qysw br Mlkw

Translation

Qays fils de Mālik

=== Ḥimà-Idhbāḥ PalAr 2 ===
Transliteration

Ḥrmlh br Ḥnẓlh

Translation

Ḥarmala fils de Ḥanẓala

=== Ḥimà-Idhbāḥ PalAr 3 ===
Transliteration

K῾bw br Ṯ῾lbh

Translation

Ka῾b fils de Tha῾laba

=== Ḥimà-Idhbāḥ PalAr 4 ===
Transliteration

Ḥnẓlh br (Q)šyrw [ou (῾)šyrw]

Translation

Ḥanẓala fils de …

=== Ḥimà-Idhbāḥ PalAr 5 ===
Transliteration

῾mr br …

Translation

῾Āmir fils de …

=== Ḥimà-Idhbāḥ PalAr 6 ===
Transliteration

M῾wyh br ᾿l-Ḥrṯ

Translation

Mu῾āwiya fils d’al-Ḥārith

=== Ḥimà-Idhbāḥ PalAr 7 ===
According to the publication, an assured reading of this inscription is presently not possible.

=== Ḥimà-al-Musammāt PalAr 1 ===
Transliteration

1 [..](s)w br Hdšw

2 5+1+1+1

3 …](᾿)l-m᾿tmr snt 4x100

Translation

1 (Qays ?) fils de Khidāsh

2 [ translation not provided ]

(3) [au mois de] al-mu᾿tamir 40(2)8

=== Ḥimà-al-Musammāt PalAr 2 ===
Transliteration

1 ῾dyw

2 br Smy῾w br ῾dyw

Translation

1 ῾Adī

2 fils de Sumay῾ fils de ῾Adī

=== Ḥimà-al-Musammāt PalAr 3 ===
Transliteration

1 Smy῾w

2 br ῾dyw

Translation

1 Sumay῾

2 fils de ῾Adī

=== Ḥimà-al-Musammāt PalAr 4 ===
Transliteration

1 …

2 … Mlkw br Bḥrw …

3 … ṭ fy ᾿l-…

4 ….. br ᾿l-ml(k)

5 … ᾿l-mlk ᾿l-Ḥsn Qys br

6 zmn hlk M(.)rw br ᾿l-Ḥrṯ

Translation

1 … …

2 … Mālik fils de Baḥr …

3 …

4 … le fils du roi

5 … le roi al-Ḥasan Qays fils de …

6 quand mourut Murr fils d’al-Ḥārith

=== Ḥimà-al-Musammāt PalAr 5 ===
Transliteration

(Christian cross)

῾bd ᾿l-Msyḥ

Translation

(Christian cross)

῾Abd al-Masīḥ

English translation

(Christian cross)

The servant of Christ

=== Ḥimà-al-Musammāt PalAr 6 ===
Transliteration

(Christian cross)

῾mrw br Mr(d).

Translation

(Christian cross)

῾Amr fils de Murād (?)

== See also ==
- Namara inscription
- Old Arabic
- Pre-Islamic Arabian inscriptions
- Yazid I
