= Yazid inscription =

The Yazīd inscription is an early Christian Paleo-Arabic rock carving from the region of as-Samrūnīyyāt, 12 km southeast of Qasr Burqu' in the northeastern Jordan.

It was discovered by Jordanian epigraphists during the first season of the El-Khḍerī archaeological and epigraphic survey project and published in 2017. It consists of only four words and a Christian cross. Notably, it mentions a certain figure known as "Yazīd the king" (yzydw ʾl-mlk), who is most likely the Umayyad ruler Yazid I.

== Text ==
The following transliteration and translation comes from the 2017 edition of the Yazid inscription.

Transliteration

1. † dkr ʾl-ʾlh

2. yzydw ʾl-mlk

Translation

1. †May God be mindful of

2. Yazīd-w the king

== Identity of Yazid ==
The identity of the figure named Yazīd in the inscription is open to interpretation, especially in light of the undated nature of the inscription. First, the term mlk (malik) in inscriptions from this period does not necessarily denote a king who ruled over a specified territory. For example, the Jebel Usays inscription applies the title to al-Harith ibn Jabalah, ruler of the Ghassanids, possibly in reference to the title he had been given of phylarch by the Byzantine emperor Justinian I. If the figure mentioned in the inscription corresponds to one from known sources, it may refer to Yazīd son of al-ʾAswad (the only figure from classical Arabic sources by the name of Yazīd associated with the Ghassanids), Yazīd son of Qays the Ḥujrid (mentioned by Photios I of Constantinople mentioned in his Bibliotheca), or Yazīd son of Kabaśat (mentioned in the late Sabaic inscription CIH 541 as a figure appointed by the South Arabian ruler Abraha). From the Islamic period, it may refer to the Umayyad ruler Yazid I, a view that is increasingly held, and ties in with the likely presence of Arab Christians in early Islamic armies.

== Linguistics ==
The formula which appears in the inscription, dkr ʾl-ʾlh ("May God be mindful of" or "May God remember"), is also found in the Zabad inscription and DaJ144PAr. The dkr element, asking God be mindful of so-and-so, is likely an Arabicization of an expression common in Nabataean graffiti, dkyr ("may so-and-so be remembered").

The Yazid inscription shares a few linguistic peculiarities with the Abd Shams inscription.

The Yazid inscription is one of the two Islamic-era inscriptions that retain the practice of wawation, once widespread in pre-Islamic Arabic, alongside PERF 558 (22 AH / 643 CE).

== See also ==
- Namara inscription
- Yazid I
