= Ruwafa inscriptions =

Greek–Nabataean Arabic inscriptions in Saudi Arabia

The Rūwafa inscriptions (or Ruwwāfa inscriptions, Rawwāfa inscriptions) are a group of five inscriptions from the 2nd century written in both Ancient Greek and Nabataean script (see Nabataean inscriptions) discovered carved into stones of the isolated Ruwāfa temple.

The temple is located in the Hisma desert of northwestern Arabia, or roughly 200 km northwest of Hegra. The inscriptions are dated to 165–169 AD. The inscriptions are numbered using Roman numerals, running from Inscriptions I to Inscription V. Two of the five inscriptions describe the structure as a temple and that it was constructed by the εθνος/šrkt of Thamud in honor of the emperors Marcus Aurelius and Lucius Verus. The Thamud tribe is otherwise well-attested to have existed in this region of Arabia from at least the 8th century BC. At the time of the composition of these inscriptions in the second century, northwestern Arabia was known as Arabia Petraea, a frontier province of the Roman Empire that had been previously conquered in 106 AD.

The location of the inscriptions are curious, given that they are found at the southern extremities of the Roman province of Arabia with little else nearby, which has been described by some as the "last place" where a set of inscriptions recognizing the imperial authority of the Roman Empire would be found, though it adds to the significance of the inscription, indicating that this distant region of Arabia alongside the allied auxiliary unit still received attention from the emperors. It may have been that the empire was recruiting some of the inhabitants of the region into the army. Today, the inscriptions are housed at the National Museum of Saudi Arabia except for the Inscription V which is lost.

== Text ==
The following reading of the Ruwafa inscriptions are based on the 2015 edition by Michael MacDonald, which is at-present the most up-to-date edition of the Ruwafa inscriptions.

=== Inscription I ===
The first three lines of the inscription are originally in Greek.

1 For the eternal duration of the power of the most divine rulers of the world, the great Augusti, Armeniaci, Marcus Aurelius Antoninus and Lucius 2 [Au]relius Verus, [ . . . ] n[atio] of the [T]hamud [ . . . ] has founded [ . . . ] with the encouragement 3 [ . . . ] and through [ . . . Qu]intinus [?] [ . . .].

The next two lines are in Nabataean.

4 For the well-being of [... Marcus] Aurelius Antoninus and Lucius Aurelius {Verus} who [...]. This is the temple which the {natio} of Thamūd made, (that is) the commanders of their natio, for the existence {of which it was set in place} by their hand and the[ir] worship [will be there] [for ever]. 5a And with the {encouragement} of [...t ˙ ...t ˙ ...A]dventus [ ...] and at their [i.e. the Thamūd's or their leaders'] {request}.

=== Inscription II ===
The second inscription is entirely in Greek.

5b For the victory and the perpetual continuance of the emperors, the Caesars [M]arcus [Au]relius Antoninus 6 and Lucius Aurelius Verus, Aug(usti), Armeniaci, [Med]ici, Parthici Maximi, and their whole hou[se], the natio of the Thamūd ... 7 have completed the temple 8 and consecrated the sanctuary 9 [... of Cl]audius Modestus 10 [... ] Proprae(tor).

=== Inscription III ===
The third inscription is entirely in Greek.

. . . of the tribe of Thamūd of Rbtw they built this sanctuary

=== Inscription IV ===
The fourth inscription is entirely in Nabataean.

1 {This} is the {temple} which {Šʿdt}, the priest of 2 {ʾlhʾ}, son of {Mgydw} who is from Rbtw 3 {made} for {ʾlhʾ} the god of ...[with?] the {encouragement} 4 of {our} lord {ʾ} ... the {governor} 5 ... ʿmnw.

=== Inscription V ===
The fifth inscription is too damaged to permit a coherent reading and the present location of the inscription, though photographs have been taken, is unknown.

== Date ==
One of the figures named in the inscription, Lucius Verus died in 169, and so 169 serves as the terminus ante quem or the upper possible date of the inscription. The inscription also mentions a propraetorian named Claudius Modestus and the emperors are given the title Parthici Maximi, which sets the lower possible date of the inscription at 165.

== Discovery ==
The first to discover the inscriptions was Alois Musil in 1910, who gave the site its name, Ruwafa. Though Musil created molds of the inscriptions, their present whereabouts are unknown. In January 1951, the British Arabist St John Philby revisited and rediscovered the inscriptions identified by Musil. But like Musil, his copies of the inscription did not survive. In 1966, Ruth Stiehl visited the site and took some photographs of the inscriptions, which were subsequently published in 1969. Additional photographs taken in 1968 by another group were turned over to Józef Milik who produced the first acceptable scholarly edition of the inscriptions.

== Interpretation ==
The inscriptions assert that they were constructed by the Θαμουδηνω̂ν εθνος or the šrkt tmwdw, identified as the nomadic Arabian tribe Thamud who are attested as early as the 8th century BC.

The meaning of some of the terms in the inscriptions has been subjected to varying debate. Michael MacDonald has proposed that εθνος and šrkt represent translations of the Latin natio to describe a military group or unit drawn from one or more groups. In the context of the inscription, it refers to a military unit drawn from members of the tribe of Thamud.

== See also ==
- Namara inscription
- Jabal Dabub inscription
- Ri al-Zallalah inscription
