= Elaia =

Elaia may refer to:

- Elaia, Evros, a town in Greece
- Elaea (disambiguation), any of numerous places
