= Harran, Suwayda =

Harran حران
- Village
- Location in Syria
- Coordinates: 32°53′12″N 36°23′1″E
- Grid position: 279/255
- Country: Syria
- Governorate: Suwayda
- District: Shahba
- Subdistrict: Ariqah

Population (2004)
  - Total: 1,523
- Time zone: UTC+2 (EET)
  - Summer (DST): UTC+3 (EEST)

Harran (Arabic: حران) is a village in the Suwayda Governorate in southwestern Syria. It is situated in the southern Lajah plateau, northwest of the city of Suwayda. According to the Syria Central Bureau of Statistics (CBS), Harran had a population of 1,523 in the 2004 census. Its inhabitants are predominantly Druze.

During the early Byzantine era, Harran's Arabic-speaking inhabitants were pagans, but by the late 6th century, the population had become Christian. A bilingual Greek and Arabic inscription known as the Harran inscription found in the village is among the earliest known appearances of written Arabic in Syria. In the early Ottoman era (16th century), Harran was a grain-producing Muslim hamlet. It was later abandoned, and then in the mid-19th century it was settled by Druze, who still inhabit the village.

== History ==
=== Byzantine era ===
Harran was inhabited during the Byzantine era in Syria, as attested by an inscription found in the village dedicated to the goddess Athena dating from 212 to 375 CE. A public hostel was built by four of the village's administrators in 397/98. It is unlikely that a majority of the Arabic-speaking inhabitants of Harran were Christians at that time.

By the late 6th century, Harran's inhabitants were Christians and the village was part of the Ghassanid tribal kingdom, a vassal of the Byzantines. A bilingual Arabic and Greek inscription was found in Harran dating from 568/69 CE. The inscription describes a martyrium built by an Arab phylarch (equivalent to sheikh, chieftain) named Sharahil ibn Zalim. Sharahil may have been associated with the Ghassanids, since his name is not found in records mentioning the tribe.

The inscription of Harran, along with two other Arabic inscriptions including the Zabad inscription found near Aleppo and the inscription at Jabal Usays mountain east of Damascus depict the earliest known appearance of Arabic in Syria. The development of written Arabic in Syria at this time was likely to facilitate the spread of Christianity among Arab tribesmen living in the region's desert fringes. The Harran inscription read:

I, Sharahil, son of Zalim, have built this martyrium in the year 463 (568 CE).

=== Ottoman era ===
In 1596 Harran appeared in the Ottoman tax registers as part of the nahiya (subdistrict) of Bani Abdullah in the Hauran Sanjak. It had an entirely Muslim population consisting of four households. They paid a fixed tax-rate of 40% on agricultural products, including wheat, barley, summer crops, goats and beehives, in addition to occasional revenues; the taxes totaled 3,350 akçe.

In 1838, Harran was noted as a ruin, situated "in the Lejah itself".

Harran was among five villages in the heart of the Lajah plateau that was settled by Druze by 1862; the villages were settled sometime between the early 19th century and 1862.

== See also ==
- Druze in Syria

== Bibliography ==
- Firro, Kais (1992). A History of the Druzes. Vol. 1. BRILL. ISBN 9004094377.
- Fowden, Elizabeth Key (1999). The Barbarian Plain: Saint Sergius between Rome and Iran. University of California Press. ISBN 9780520922204.
- Hütteroth, W.-D.; Abdulfattah, K. (1977). Historical Geography of Palestine, Transjordan and Southern Syria in the Late 16th Century. Erlanger Geographische Arbeiten, Sonderband 5. Erlangen, Germany: Vorstand der Fränkischen Geographischen Gesellschaft. ISBN 3-920405-41-2.
- Robin, Christian Julien (2012). "Arabia and Ethiopia". The Oxford Handbook of Late Antiquity. Oxford University Press. ISBN 978-0-19-999633-9.
- Robinson, E.; Smith, E. (1841). Biblical Researches in Palestine, Mount Sinai and Arabia Petraea: A Journal of Travels in the year 1838. Vol. 3. Boston: Crocker & Brewster.
- Trombley, Frank R. (1995). Hellenic Religion and Christianization: C. 370–529. Brill. ISBN 9004096914.
