= Jebel Usays inscription =

Syrian palaeo-Arabic rock graffito (528 AD)

The Jebel Usays inscription (or Jabal Usays, Jabal Says) is a small rock graffito dating to 528 AD, located at the site of Jabal Says, an ancient volcano in the basaltic steppe lands of southern Syria. It is written in the Paleo-Arabic script. Only two other inscriptions written in the Paleo-Arabic scripts are known from Syria: the Zabad inscription, dating to 512, and the Harran inscription dating to 567–568. All three are connected to the Jafnids.

== Text ==
The following transcription and translation of the inscription comes from the 2015 edition of the inscription.

Transliteration

1. ʾnh rqym br mʿrf ʾl-ʾwsy

2. ʾrsl-ny ʾl-h ˙ rṯʾl-mlk ʿly

3. ʾsys mslh ˙ h snt 4.

4. 4x100+20+1+1+1

Translation

1. I Ruqaym son of Maʿarrif the Awsite

2. Al-Hāriṯ the king sent me to

3. Usays, as a frontier guard, [in] the year

4. 423 [= ad 528/9].

== Date ==
The inscription states the year it was written, and that year has been read in two ways by experts. In one reading, it is read as 423, and in another, it is read as 428. The era referred to is the one established at the founding of the Roman province of Arabia Petraea at 106 AD, known as the Bostran era: hence the date either corresponds to 528 AD or 532/3 AD in the Gregorian calendar.

== Discovery and context ==
The inscription was first published in facsimile without a photograph by Muḥammad Abū ʾl-Faraj al-ʿUshsh in 1964. In 1971, Adolf Grohmann republished it with both a facsimile and a photograph.

The Jebel Usays inscription is one of six inscriptions clearly providing the name of a Jafnid phylarch (al-malik), though two more may mention them. Three were discovered in situ, whereas the other three, including the Jebel Says inscription, were discovered in a secondary position. The Jebel Usays inscription was engraved on ashlar close to the summit of a volcano. The military installation described by the inscription is not known from the context in which it was found, but despite this, the inscription is the only material evidence for territorial control by the Jafnids.

== Interpretation ==
The inscription claims to be written by one 'Ruqaym son of Maarrif the Awsite' dispatched by the Jafnid leader (phylarch) Al-Harith ibn Jabalah to act as a frontier guard at Jabal Says.

The Jebel Says inscription has a similar syntactic form to the Harran inscription (topic (first person singular personal pronoun) / comment; "I so-and-so, I did such-and-such"), another inscription written a few decades later also in the Paleo-Arabic script.

== See also ==
- Ri al-Zallalah inscription
- Harran inscription
