= Knidos, Cyprus =

Ancient Greek city

Knidus or Cnidus was an ancient Greek city on the Elaea promontory in northeastern Cyprus. It currently lies in the de facto Turkish Republic of Northern Cyprus
