= Monotheism in pre-Islamic Arabia =

Belief in a single god in Arabia before Islam

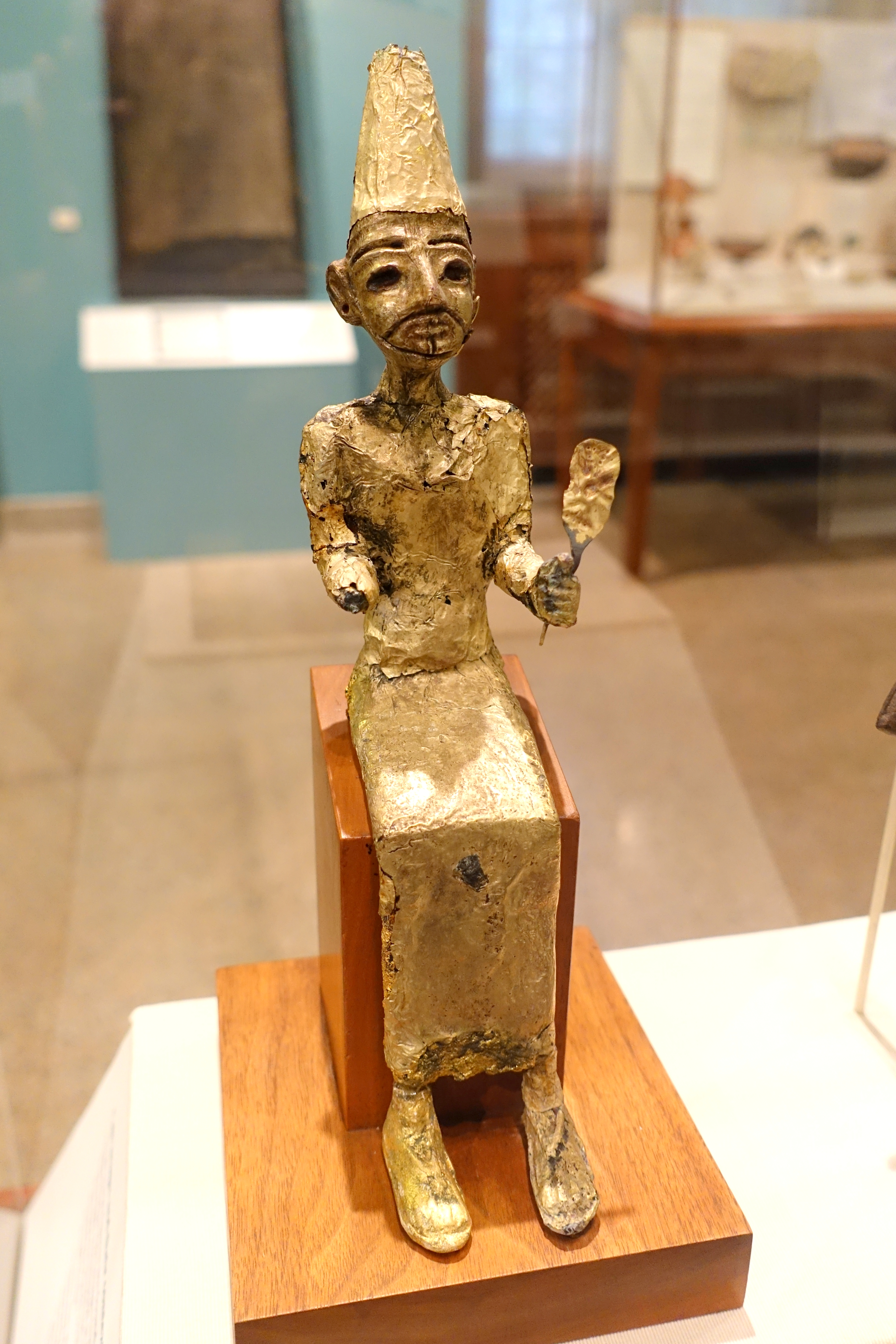
Gilded statue of the Canaanite supreme deity El (c. 1400–1200 BC) from the site of Tel Megiddo. El is identical to the Ugaritic god Ilu, whose name is considered to be the cognate of the word "Ilah", which later became Allah.

Monotheists in pre-Islamic Arabia included followers of Christianity, Judaism, and other populations unaffiliated with either one of the two major Abrahamic religions of the time. Monotheism first became prominent in the region in the late antique period of Arabia.

Until around the fourth century CE, nearly all of the inhabitants of Arabia practiced polytheism. In the fourth to sixth centuries, Christianity spread significantly in Arabia, particularly in the north. In the fourth century, the ruling class of the Himyarite Kingdom, which ruled over South Arabia, converted to Judaism, although they presented a neutral outwards monotheism in engagement with the public. In the sixth century, the Aksumite invasion of Himyar led to Christian rule in the region. There were also Jewish communities in the Hejaz and other parts of pre-Islamic Arabia.

The decline of polytheism after the fourth century is documented from inscriptions in all writing systems on the Arabian Peninsula (including those in Nabataean, Safaitic, and Sabaic), where polytheistic gods and idols cease to be mentioned. South Arabian inscriptions are almost exclusively monotheistic by the fourth century; in North Arabia, inscriptions are entirely monotheistic by the sixth century, before the advent of Islam. Pre-Islamic Arabic poetry also suggests that its authors were monotheists or at least henotheists. By the time of Muhammad, Arabian polytheism was marginalized; save for a few urban centres and oases where polytheistic temples still existed (including Mecca), "polytheistic cults were no longer practiced except in the steppe and the desert". According to one interpretation, the pagan deities mentioned in the Qu'ran had already been demoted to the status of intercessors subordinate to Allah, the High God.

Islamic tradition—as in the Book of Idols by Hisham ibn al-Kalbi (737–819)—characterises Arabia as dominated by polytheism and by idolatry before the mission of Muhammad. Such a representation is important to the Islamic idea of pre-Islamic Arabia as the Jahiliyyah ("Age of Ignorance"). Monotheism was allegedly confined to small pockets, like the Christian community of Najran or to Jewish tribes such as the Banu Qurayza. There was also the occasional hanif ("renunciate"). The awāʾil ("firsts") genre of literature frequently attributes the status of the first true monotheist to figures of the sixth and early-seventh-centuries like Quss Ibn Sa'ida al-Iyadi (died c. 610), Waraqah ibn Nawfal (died c. 610), and Zayd ibn Amr (died 605).

== Polytheistic era ==
Early attestations of Arabian polytheism include Esarhaddon's Annals, mentioning Atarsamain, Nukhay, Ruldaiu, and Atarquruma. Herodotus, writing in his Histories, reported that the Arabs worshipped Orotalt (identified with Dionysus) and Alilat (identified with Aphrodite). Strabo stated the Arabs worshipped Dionysus and Zeus. Origen stated they worshipped Dionysus and Urania. Similarly, late Nabataean, Safaitic, and Sabaic inscriptions attest to the veneration of a broad array of sacred stones and polytheistic deities until the fourth century.

== Judaism ==
Judaism is attested on the Arabian Peninsula since the 1st century BC, and it is the first form of monotheism documented in the area. The main centers of Judaism were in Northwest and Southern Arabia. Judaism briefly gained political ascendancy in South Arabia, from the late fourth century when Malkikarib Yuhamin converted to the religion, until the first decades of the sixth century, when the Aksumite invasion of Himyar ushered Christian rule into the region. Local forms of political involvement also occurred in the Northwest: for example, one inscription from 203 AD states that a Jew named Isaiah became the head of the Tayma oasis. Additional inscriptions from the mid-4th century refer to Jewish headmen of both Hegra and Dedan. Christian J. Robin has suggested that a governor of one of the tribes in central Arabia, Ḥujr, may have been Jewish. In eastern Arabia, Josephus claims that a son of the first-century king of Adiabene converted to Judaism.

Literary sources outside of Arabia occasionally refer to Jewish communities there, such as a passage from the Midrash Rabba which says two rabbis travelled to Hegra to improve their Aramaic. Procopius, a 6th-century Byzantine historian, also mentions that "Hebrews had lived from of old in autonomy, but in the reign of this Justinian they have become subject to the Romans", referring to the Tiran Island. A few Palestinian and Jordanian inscriptions also reveal knowledge of the South Arabian Jewish community.

== Christianity ==
Christianity was one of the major religions of pre-Islamic Arabia. It was introduced by the fourth century and achieved a major presence by the fifth. Bishoprics were established in multiple areas in Eastern Arabia, as well as in Arabia Petraea, Najran, and Zafar. Churches, martyria and monasteries were constructed across the peninsula, allowing local leaders to display their benefaction in the region, communicate with locals and with local officials, and to establish points of contact with Byzantine representatives.

Christian proselytism also happened throughout the peninsula, especially in its northwest and southwest. Northern proselytization was driven by Syrian Christian missionaries, and the south, by Ethiopian Christians in the aftermath of the Ethiopian conquest of the South Arabian Kingdom of Himyar. Many conversion stories of Arabs are found in Byzantine Christian literature, especially those with a Syrian and Iraqi background. Arabian Christian communities are also known from the Quran and a growing number of pre-Islamic Arabian inscriptions.

The major center of Christianity in pre-Islamic Arabia was in South Arabia, and Christian activity in the region goes back to missions commissioned into the region by Constantius II. By the course of the fourth century, the rulers of South Arabia sharply turned towards Judaism instead of Christianity, during the reign of Malkikarib Yuhamin, abandoning the old polytheism for the one, monotheistic god Rahmanan ("The Merciful One"). Former temples were decommissioned, or converted into synagogues. In this time, Christianity also grew, and heavy resistance prompted a massacre of the Christian community of Najran in the early sixth century under Dhu Nuwas. The massacre prompted an invasion by the nearby Christian Aksumite Kingdom in Ethiopia, ushering in a period of Christian rule during the 520s. The first of the Christian rulers of South Arabia was Sumyafa Ashwa, but he was quickly overthrown by his rival, Abraha. Abraha dominated regional politics for most of the middle of the 6th century. Christianity became the official religion and inscriptions begin mentioning churches, priests, abbots, and monasteries. The high god continues to be called Rahmanan in these texts, but the texts are now also accompanied by crosses and references to Jesus Christ and the Holy Spirit. Abraha realigned himself from the Ethiopian to the Syriac churches, and his influence extended across the Arabian Peninsula as a product of his expansive conquests.

== Non-Abrahamic monotheism ==
In Late Antiquity, monotheism rose among many groups of people unaffiliated with either Christianity or Judaism, and so are sometimes labelled as "gentile monotheists". A famous example of this was the Hypsistarians, belivers of "Theos Hypsistos", meaning "the highest God". Gentile monotheists are also known from pre-Islamic Arabia, suggested by both the Quran and pre-Islamic Arabic poetry.

== Sources ==
=== Epigraphy ===
With a few exceptions, there are no polytheistic pre-Islamic Arabian inscriptions from the fourth to sixth centuries: among over one hundred monumental inscriptions that could testify to a polytheistic cult, only two of them do, along with less than ten inscriptions from wood remains. Similarly, of 58 extant Late Sabaic inscriptions that mention the theonym Rahmanan from the period of Jewish rule in south Arabia, none of them can be labelled as pagan or polytheistic. Invocation of alternative deities was rare, though it suggests the cult surrounding Rahmanan was henotheistic as opposed to purely monotheistic. Once Christian rule initiates in South Arabia in the early sixth century, extant inscriptions become purely monotheistic.

Epigraphic evidence further attests to the spread of Judaism beyond South Arabia, into northwestern Arabia, as well as Christianity into all major regions of Arabia including northern Arabia and the southern Levant, southern Arabia, western Arabia, and across the gulf of eastern Arabia. All Paleo-Arabic inscriptions from the fifth and sixth centuries, which have been found in all major regions of the Arabian peninsula and in the southern Levant, are either monotheistic or explicitly Christian. These inscriptions also demonstrate a penetration of monotheism into previously thought holdouts or surviving bastions of paganism or polytheism, such as Dumat al-Jandal and Taif (which ibn al-Kalbi held to be the centre of the cult of Al-Lat in the sixth century). These inscriptions refer to God with the use of terms like Allāh, al-Ilāh (ʾl-ʾlh), and Rabb ("Lord"). The uncontracted form Al-Ilāh/ʾl-ʾlh is thought to have among Christians as an isomorphism or calque for the Greek expression ho theos, which is how the Hebrew ʾĕlōhîm is rendered in the Septuagint. This uncontracted form continued to be used by Christians until the tenth century, even as the form ʾllh appeared in the Quran with two consecutive lāms without a hamza. One Islamic-era example of the uncontracted form is in the Yazid inscription.

=== Pre-Islamic poetry ===
Pre-Islamic Arabic poetry rarely mentions idols or the gods and practices of polytheistic religion. Principally, they indicate a belief in monotheism.

=== Quran ===
The Quran occasionally offers evidence for vestiges of knowledge of polytheistic deities in two passages. Its descriptions of the "associators" (mushrikūn) have been increasingly understood, since originally being posited by Julius Wellhausen, to be references to monotheistic individuals who did not dispute the supremacy of Allah but instead believed in other beings (such as angels) that acted as intermediaries in the devotion to the one high God.

=== Arabic historiography ===
Muslim-era historiographical sources, such as the eighth-century Book of Idols by Hisham ibn al-Kalbi as well as the writings of the Yemeni historian al-Hasan al-Hamdani on South Arabian religious beliefs continue to depict pre-Islamic Arabia as dominated by polytheistic practices until the sudden rupture brought about by the coming of Muhammad and his career between 610 and 632.

Ibn Hazm (d. 1064) attempts to describe the broad landscape of pre-Islamic religious belief in his Jamharat ansāb al-ʿArab (Compilation of Arab Genealogy):

all of [Mesopotamian tribes] Iyād and Rabīʿah and Bakr and Taghlib and Namar and [the eastern] ʿAbd al-Qays are Christian, so too is [Syrian] Ghassān, and [the southern] Banū Ḥārith ibn Kaʿb in Najrān, and [the northern] al-Ṭayyiʾ, Tanūkh, many of [the Syrian] Kalb, and all those from [Najdi] Tamīm and [Iraqi] Lakhm residing in Ḥīrah. Ḥimyar were Jewish, as were many from Kindah. Khathʿam had no religion at all (lā tadīn bi-shayʾ aṣlan). Zoroastrianism (al-majūsiyyah) appeared among Tamīm, and it is said that Laqīṭ ibn Zurārah had converted to Zoroastrianism (qad tamajassa). The rest of the Arabs worshipped idols.

== See also ==
- Hypsistarians
- Religion in pre-Islamic Arabia

== Sources ==
- Dziekan, Marek M. (2012). "Quss Ibn Sa'ida al-Iyadi (6th–7th Cent. A.D.), Bishop of Najran An Arabic and Islamic Cultural Hero Authors". Studia Ceranea. 2: 127–135.
- Hoyland, Robert G. (11 September 2001). "Religion". Arabia and the Arabs: From the Bronze Age to the Coming of Islam. Peoples of the Ancient World. London: Routledge. ISBN 9781134646340.
- Lindstedt, Ilkka (2023). Muhammad and His Followers in Context: The Religious Map of Late Antique Arabia. Brill.
- Lindstedt, Ilkka (2023b). "The Seed of Abraham: Gentile Ethnicity in Early Christian Texts and The Quran". Advances in Ancient, Biblical, and Near Eastern Research. 3 (3): 253–313.
- Robin, Christian Julien (2010). "Nagrān vers l'époque du massacre : notes sur l'histoire politique, économique et institutionnelle et sur l'introduction du christianisme (avec un réexamen du Martyre d'Azqīr)". In Beaucamp, Joelle; Briquel-Chatonnet, Francoise; Robin, Christian Julien (eds.). Juifs Et Chretiens En Arabie Aux Ve Et Vie Siecles: Regards Croises Sur Les Sources. Peeters. pp. 39–106.
- Robin, Christian Julien (2020). "Allāh avant Muḥammad". Jerusalem Studies in Arabic and Islam. 49: 1–145.
- Sinai, Nicolai (2019). Rain-giver, bone-breaker, score-settler: allāh in Pre-Quranic poetry. Lockwood Press.
