= Elaea (island) =

Elaea /ɪˈliːə/ (Greek: Ελαία Elaíā) was mentioned by Pliny (Natural History, v.32) as the ancient name of an island in the Propontis (Sea of Marmara), in Bithynia. It was one of the Demonisi group (Princes' Islands), but it is not certain which of the several small islands Pliny referred to.
