= Elaea (Lebanon) =

Ancient Greek city

Elaea or Elaia (Greek: Ελαία) was an ancient Greek city located in the foothills southwest of Sidon, Lebanon.
