= Elaea (Aethiopia) =

Elaea or Elaia (Greek: Ελαία) is an ancient harbor town on the African coast of the Red Sea or the Gulf of Aden. The harbor is mentioned by Strabo (xvi. 8).
