= Zabad inscription =

6th century Arabic inscription from Syria

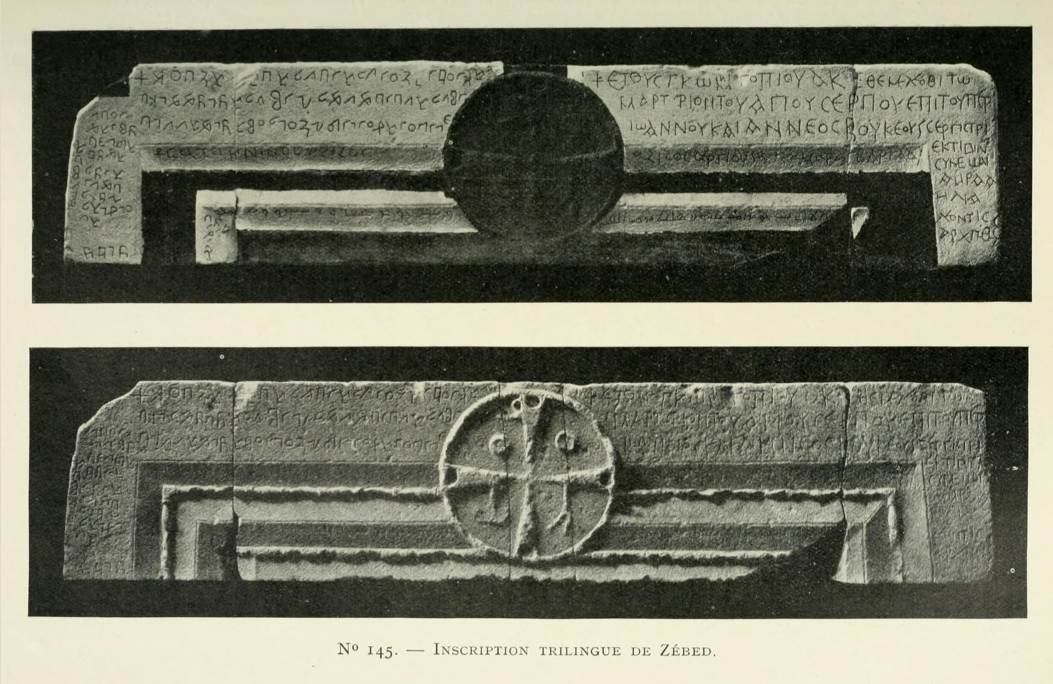
Zabad inscription (512 AD)

The Zabad inscription (also spelled Zebed) is a trilingual inscription written in Greek, Syriac, and Paleo-Arabic, located at the lintel of the entrance portal of the martyrium of Saint Sergius in the village of Zabad, northern Syria. The inscription dates to 512.

Despite being called "trilingual", the Greek, Syriac, and Arabic portions have different messages, reflecting the differing interests of each of the linguistic communities that contributed to the martyrium's construction. Only the Greek text explicitly mentions the martyrium and saint. The individuals named and acknowledged in the inscription likely were the martyrium's sponsors. Currently, scholarship believes that all three inscriptions were incised in the same time.

The inclusion of the Arabic portion reflects the desire of the Arabic Christian community to express an independent cultural identity, alongside that of the Christian communities that spoke Greek (the imperial language) and those that spoke Syriac (the ecclesiastical language of the Miaphysite Church). The Ghassanids were a major Arab Christian tribe who participated in the construction.

Today, the inscription can be found at the Art & History Museum in Brussels.

== Name ==
Though it is called the Zabad inscription today, earlier publications referred to it as the "Zebed" inscription which more closely resembles local pronunciation.

== Date ==
The Greek and Syriac portions of the inscription indicate that construction began in the year 823 of the Seleucid era (in accordance with the calendar being used in Syria at the time), or 512 AD.

== Text ==
The following translations are that of George Bevan.

=== Greek ===
In the year 823 on the 24th day of month Gorpiaios the martyrion of Saint Sergius was built from the foundations in the time of the periodeutes [itinerant clergy] John and of Anneos, son of Bo{r}keos, and Sergius son of Sergius son of Sergius. Symeon, son of Amraas, son of Elias, and Leontius were the architects who built it. Amen. Saturninus Azizos. Azizos son of Sergius and Azizos Mara Barka gave (gifts).

=== Syriac ===
Glory be to the Father and to the Son and the Holy Spirit. In the year 823 of the month Illul the foundations were laid and John the periodeutes, may his memory be blessed, laid the first stone, and it was Mara who wrote (the inscription), and it was Annas and Antiochus who were the founders. (in the margin) Abu Sergius.

=== Arabic ===
May God be mindful of Sirgu son of Abd- Manafu and Ha{l/n}i son of Mara al-Qays and Sirgu son of Sadu and Syrw and S{.}ygw

(Syriac, after the Arabic text)

Abu Sergius and Antiochus and Muqim bar Timay and Mari rebuilt it.

== Discovery and history ==
The Zabad inscription was discovered in the second half of the nineteenth century in Zabad, Syria by Johann Gottfried Wetzstein. However, it was only recorded for the first time by Eduard Sachau in 1879, and then published by him in 1881. The inscription was still known to be in its original location in 1894 according to the documentation of Adolphe Barthélemy, but by 1898, was reported by Mark Lidzbarski to have entered the hands of a dealer located in Aleppo. However, due to the petitioning of Henri Lammens, it was acquired by the Art & History Museum, a public museum in Brussels, by 1904.

== Interpretation ==
Each inscription lists patronymics. Both the Greek and Syrian texts list the month of composition, but the Greek section describes it using the name of the Macedonian month whereas the Syriac section lists it using the name of the Syrian month. The Greek text is more concerned with the administrative element of the project, listing the name of the structure, the names of the two primary architects (Symeon and Leontius), and the three donors. The Syriac text lists the name of the individual who wrote the inscription, Mārā.

Both Zabad and DaJ144PAr 1 (548–549), another Paleo-Arabic inscription, have a cross. The use of the formula 'may God remember' in Zabad is also found in DaJ144PAr 1 (548–549) and the Islamic-era inscription of Yazīd.

== Linguistics ==
Although the earliest, the Zabad inscription is similar to other Paleo-Arabic inscriptions, especially the Harran inscription (in southern Syria) and the Umm al-Jimal inscription. Together, these three highlight the evolution of the Nabataean Arabic script into Paleo-Arabic and the geographical spread of Paleo-Arabic.

Compared with other Paleo-Arabic inscriptions, the shape of the letter dāl is different only in the Zabad inscription. Likewise, it is only in the Zabad inscription that the hā is found at the beginning of a word, and the shape of the hā in Zabad is not found in Islamic-era inscriptions.

== See also ==
- Jabal Dabub inscription
- Ri al-Zallalah inscription
- Ruwafa inscriptions
- History of Syria
