= Elaea (promontory of Cyprus) =

Elaea or Elaia (Greek: Ελαία; Turkish: Zeytin Burnu) was the ancient name for a promontory of Cyprus, near the ancient city of Knidos. The cape lies within the territory of the Turkish Republic of Northern Cyprus.
