= CIH 541 =

Arabian inscription, dated 548 CE

CIH 541, or the Marib Dam stele, is a pre-Islamic Arabian inscription dated to 548 CE and written in Sabaic. It was commissioned by Abraha, the ruler of the Himyarite Kingdom, to symbolize the consolidation of his power. It's his longest inscription, running up to 136 lines.

CIH 541 describes a plague that struck the Himyarite Kingdom, which some have interpreted as evidence for the spread of the Plague of Justinian into pre-Islamic Arabia. The inscription contains the final archaeological reference to the Marib dam before its ultimate demise, describing the lengthy efforts Abraha went to in order to commission its repair including by: supplying 50,806 measures of flour, 26,000 measures of dates, 3,000 cattle worth of meat, 7,200 small stock, 300 camel loads of wine, and 11,000 measures of date wine. The inscription is also known for being the last extant inscription to refer to the family that once ruled Sheba.

Abraha's name on the fourth line of the inscription has been damaged or excised. This is thought to reflect the wish by some in later periods to wipe out memory of Ethiopian rule over South Arabia. A reference is made to a church in Marib; this same church appears to be identified in an earlier inscription X.BSB 74, whose date indicates that this church already existed during the invasion of South Arabia by Kaleb of Axum in 525, indicating some degree of continuity for the Christian community at Marib.

CIH 541 has been used in Quranic studies to contextualize the vocabulary of the Quran. CIH 541 is the only pre-Islamic source to use a cognate of the Quranic word for a messenger, rasūl, in the section describing a conference hosted by Abraha that received delegations from Ethiopia, Byzantium, Persia, and the Ghassanids (lines 87–92). The word is used for the Ghassanid delegation, with other terms being used for the other delegations. In CIH 541, the word is used to refer to a political office: a diplomatic representative or messenger. This secular sense of a messenger contrasts with the religious sense that the term takes on in the Quran. CIH 541 also has a cognate of the Quranic term khalīfa, denoting a successor or an earthly ambassador. The only pre-Islamic inscription where a cognate for this term appears besides CIH 541 is Ry 506, also set up by Abraha. In these inscriptions, the cognate denotes someone with in the political office of a governor, although their status is inferior to that of Abraha himself. In CIH 541, Abraha is said to appointed someone as a khlft for Kinda.

== Content ==
The chronological contents of the inscription are as follows:

- A Trinitarian thanksgiving formula (lines 1–3)
- A reference to Abraha (4), his titles (4–6) and dominions (6–8)
- A rebellion that Abraha subdued (9–55)
- Repair of the Marib dam (55–61)
- Celebration of a mass in a church (65–67)
- Description of a plague (72–75)
- Some of Abraha's military campaigns (76–80) after which he describes returning to Marib (80–87)
- A delegation that involved the assembly of diplomats from Ethiopia, Byzantium, Persia, and the Arab kingdoms at a conference (87–92)
- More about the plague, rebuilding of the Marib dam, the mass celebration (92–117)
- A detailed list of provisions (118–136)

CIH 541 has also been linked with a closely related inscription found in the same building, DAI GDN 2002–20, which is another 41 lines long.

== See also ==
- Ja 1028
- DJE 23
