= Elaea (river) =

River in Greece

Elaea or Elaia (Greek: Ελαία) is the ancient name of a small stream of Boeotia rising in the Delos Mountains and emptying into Lake Copais near the temple of Apollo Tegyraios.
