= Jabal Sais =

Syrian desert fortification

Jabal Sais جبل سايس
- Location within Syria

General information
- Location: Rif Dimashq, Syria
- Coordinates: 33.303116°N 37.359575°E

Technical details
- Material: adobe

Jabal Sais (Arabic: جبل سايس) also known as Qasr Says is a Umayyad desert fortification or former palace in Syria which was built 707-715 AD. The fortification sits near an extinct volcano. Jabal Says is mountain peak next to the fortification which sits 621 meters above sea level.

== History ==
Built from 707-715 AD and located in the Syrian Desert. The location was dependent on the seasonal supply of water which pooled next to the volcano crater. The palace is now just a vestige. The settlement at Jabal Says has existed since 528 AD. According to the historian Jere L. Bacharach, al-Walid I built Jabal Says, likely as a Bedouin summer encampment between his base of operations in al-Qaryatayn and another of his desert forts, Qasr Burqu'.

== Jebel Usays inscription ==
The site contains a famous inscription known as the Jebel Usays inscription composed either in 528 or 532/3 AD. It describes the Jafnid leader Al-Harith ibn Jabalah with the leader al-malik, corresponding to how the title is spelt in Syriac texts from the time.

== See also ==
- Desert castles
- List of castles in Syria
