= Jabal Dabub inscription =

South Arabian graffito inscription

The Jabal Ḏabūb inscription (also known as Jabal Ḏabūb 1) is a South Arabian graffito inscription composed in a minuscule variant of the late Sabaic language and dates to the 6th century, notable for the appearance of a pre-Islamic variant of the Basmala. It was found on a rocky facade at the top of the eastern topside of Mount Thaboob in the Dhale region of Yemen, and first published in 2018 by M.A. Al-Hajj and A.A. Faqʿas, with the reading and interpretation of the text revised by Ahmad Al-Jallad in 2022.

== Text ==
The inscription is two lines long. The editio princeps originally read:

بسم للاه الرحمن الرحيم ربه السمواته الرزاق ) الذيه( مفضلك ) أيها االنسان( والمردف نعمهه عليكه ) بأنه( أعطاك االيمانه بسم للاه الرحمن الرحيم ربه السمواته (أسألكه( الرزق من فضلك وأن تمنحه عقله ) قبلهه( قوة)حالوة( االيمان

Later, the reading was revised to:

بسم الله الرحمن

ارحمنا رب السموات

ارزقنا من فضلك

و آترنا مخّه سكمت ايامنا

bs¹mlh | rḥmn | rḥmn | rb | s¹mwt

r{z}{q}n | mfḍlk | wʾṯrn | mḫh | s²kmt ʾymn

In English:

In the name of Allāh, the Raḥmān

have mercy upon us, O lord of the heavens

satisfy us by means of your favor

and grant us the essence of it at the end/gift of our days

== Dating ==
The first dating of the text, based on reconstructing it as an Islamic Basmala, led to it being dated to the mid-7th century. The revised reading lacks an Islamic Basmala, rather it possesses an earlier stage in the evolution of the Basmala, as well as a lack of use of standardized Arabic language from early Islamic inscriptions (including graffiti), indicating a date in the sixth century, or the early seventh century at the latest. An assessment of the script of the inscription (Late Sabaic) suggests it was written in the mid-6th century.

== Interpretation and significance ==
The author may have been Jewish. Significantly, this inscription contains a pre-Islamic Arabian reference to the Basmala, invoking the monotheistic deity Rahmanan. However, while this inscription is apparently the first attested case where "In the name of Allāh/God" is combined with "the Merciful", the Qur'anic form of the Basmalah contains a phraseological expansion into a tripartite form to include the final adjective al-raḥīm. It is possible that this expansion was made to facilitate the common Qur’anic rhyme ī/ū + m/n.

The request, "have mercy upon us, O lord of the heavens" resembles the biblical phrase "Have mercy on us, O LORD, have mercy on us" in Psalm 123:3. Likewise, the request to "grant us the essence of it at the end of our days" may also be a reference to another Psalmic passage, where the reader asks "So teach us to number our days, that we may obtain a heart of wisdom" (Psalm 90:12). The particular phrasing of rabb al-samāwāt is also known from the Quran (rabbu s-samāwāti wa-l-ʾarḍi, Q 19:65). In its use of both the terms "Allāh", which was the proper name of the one monotheistic God in pre-Islamic North Arabia, and "Rahmān", the proper name of the one South Arabian monotheistic God, this inscription may reflect a syncretism that resulted from an alliance between multiple Arabian tribes to symbolize their political unity.

Alongside the ʿAbd- Shams inscription and the Ri al-Zallalah inscription, the Jabal Dabub inscription implies that the use of the term rabb was widely used by Arabian monotheists.

== See also ==
- Monotheism in pre-Islamic Arabia
- Hanifs
- Namara inscription
- Ri al-Zallalah inscription
