= Bostran era =

Calendar era of the Roman province of Arabia Petraea

The Bostran era (also called the era of Bostra, the Arabian era or provincial era) was a calendar era (year numbering) with an epoch (start date) corresponding to 22 March 106 AD. It was the official era of the Roman province of Arabia Petraea, introduced to replace dating by regnal years after the Roman annexation of the Nabataean Kingdom. It is named after the city of Bostra, which became the headquarters of the Sixth Legion stationed in the province.

== Dates and names ==
The start date of the Bostran era was once a matter of dispute, in part because the Chronicon Paschale explicitly puts it the year of the consuls Candidus and Quadratus, that is, 105. Manuscript discoveries from the Cave of Letters put the issue to rest: the era of Bostra began in 106. The Bostran calendar was lunisolar. It had twelve months of 30 days with five epagomenal days at the end of the year. The month names came from the ancient Macedonian calendar, although Nabataean equivalents were also used. A leap year came once every four years in the Bostran calendar starting from the second year. Thus years 2, 6, 10 etc. were leap years with a sixth epagomenal day. The first day of the first month, Xanthikos, corresponded to 22 March in the Julian calendar, approximately the vernal equinox. The Bostran calendar—as the calendar of Arabia or of the Arabs—is one of sixteen that appear in the Florence, Leiden and Vatican hemerologia.

The Bostran calendar was used in texts of the Nabataean and Palestinian Jewish varieties of Aramaic, in Greek and in Arabic. Inscriptions from Arabia Petraea which do not specify the era but simply provide a year number are usually in the era of Bostra. In documents, this era is usually indicated by the phrase "[year] of the province" (e.g., Aramaic lhprkyʾ). Sometimes the province is specified by the name "Arabia" or "Bostra" (e.g. Greek τῆς ἐπαρχείας Ἀραβίας, tes eparcheias Arabias, or τῆς Βοστρηνῶν, tes Bostrenon; Aramaic lhprk bṣrʾ). Such indications, however, are rare for inscriptions, where usually only a year number appears. The occasional use of the name "Bostra" for dating should not, however, be taken to indicate that it was the capital of the province; Petra was in fact more prominent in the early years. The dating formula and the use of the Bostran era have no special connection to the city beyond the fact that as the seat of the main Roman military base, it was symbolic of the incorporation of Nabataea as a province. The Chronicon Paschale makes clear that the new dating system was common to the whole province.

There are only three inscriptions that use the name of the city of Bostra to clarify the year and they are dated to AD 265/6, 397/8 and 538/9. There are also two inscriptions from AD 576/7 and 581/2 in the same calendar that specify the year as being that of Elusa. Zbigniew Fiema suggests that the Crisis of the Third Century, which ultimately resulted in the division of the province of Arabia, caused locals to see their calendar with its base date corresponding to 106 as distinctly associated with different major cities. For Fiema, the Emperor Philip the Arab's granting to Bostra of metropolis status in 244 and the transfer of the administration of Palaestina Tertia from Petra to Elusa after the earthquake of 551 are the proximate causes of the shift in nomenclature.

Some documents after AD 127 are dated by the era of the "new" province (νέα ἐπαρχεία Ἀραβία, nea eparcheia Arabia), perhaps in conjunction with the first census in the new province, which was taken in that year.

== Usage ==
The Bostran era was used extensively in "commemorative and honorific inscriptions", but less frequently in "administrative and legal documents". Its usage was not enforced by the Romans and many cities continued to use local calendars on locally minted coinage. These included the Pompeian era (63 BC) in some cities of the Decapolis and the era of Capitolias (AD 97/98). The Bostran era may itself be a spontaneous local response to the political changes which rendered the old Nabataean regnal year numbering impossible.

The oldest example of the era is found in a Nabataean inscription at Oboda from AD 107. The earliest document is a Nabataean papyrus from Naḥal Ḥever (AD 120). The earliest attestation in Greek is from a papyrus also from Naḥal Ḥever (AD 125). An official inscription of the Emperor Gordian III at Bostra (AD 238/9) uses the provincial era. A unique and oft-cited example of Bostran dating comes from a bilingual inscription of AD 108/9 at Madaba. The Nabataean dating clause reads "third year of the eparch of Bostra". There was no such office and the Roman legate did not sit at Bostra, rather the inscription awkwardly combines the new dating method with the old one of dating by the Nabataean king's regnal year.

There is some uncertainty whether the era of Arabia was ever used outside the province of Arabia (roughly the Transjordan, the Sinai and the Negev) while the Roman administration was still intact. Inscriptions have been found in the Wadi Mukattab in the Sinai (AD 149 and 191). Some inscriptions have been tentatively identified as dated by the Bostran era in the neighbouring provinces of Syria to the north or Judea to the west. A Jewish Aramaic document of AD 111 from Masada in Judaea written in Hebrew letters may use the era, but David Goodblatt doubts it.

The use of the era spread with the province of Arabia and its successors. The inscriptions of 397/8 and 538/9 are from Ḥarrān and ʿAmra, respectively, places not incorporated into the empire until the Severan dynasty (193–235). There are several Christian inscriptions of the late fifth and early sixth centuries in the Arabic script that bear dates in the Arabian era. These are found in Syria and South Arabia, far beyond the old provincial boundaries. The use of the provincial era continued well into the Islamic period, even as late as AD 735. In the later period, the calendar era was almost never identified explicitly.

== Sources ==
- Bowersock, Glen Warren (1970). "The Annexation and Initial Garrison of Arabia". Zeitschrift für Papyrologie und Epigraphik. 5: 37–47. JSTOR 20180208.
- Butcher, Kevin (2003). Roman Syria and the Near East. Getty Publications.
- Cotton, Hannah M. (1997). "Ἡ νέα ἐπαρχεία Ἀραβία: The New Province of Arabia in the Papyri from the Judaean Desert". Zeitschrift für Papyrologie und Epigraphik. 116: 204–208.
- Fiema, Zbigniew Tomasz (1988). "The Era of Bostra: A Reconsideration". In F. Campanati; R. Goianfranco; F. Goianfranco (eds.). The Proceedings of the XXXV Corso di cultura sull'arte Ravennate e Bizantina. Ravenna. pp. 109–121.
- Goodblatt, David (1999). "Dating Documents in Provincia Iudaea: A Note on Papyri Murabbaʿat 19 and 20". Israel Exploration Journal. 49 (3): 249–259. JSTOR 27926897.
- Gyllenbok, Jan (2018). Encyclopaedia of Historical Metrology, Weights, and Measures. Vol. 1. Birkhäuser.
- Hoyland, Robert (2018). "Two New Arabic Inscriptions: Arabian Castles and Christianity in the Umayyad Period". In Laïla Nehmé; Ahmad Al-Jallad (eds.). To the Madbar and Back Again: Studies in the Languages, Archaeology, and Cultures of Arabia Dedicated to Michael C. A. Macdonald. Brill. pp. 327–337.
- MacAdam, Henry Innes (1979). Studies in the History of the Roman Province of Arabia (PhD dissertation). University of Manchester.
- Mercier, Raymond (2001). "Intercalation in the Era of the Province of Arabia". Revue Biblique. 108 (1): 101–108. JSTOR 44089535.
- Meimaris, Y. E.; Kritikakou, K.; Bougia, P. (1992). Chronological Systems in Roman–Byzantine Palestine and Arabia: The Evidence of the Dated Greek Inscriptions. Research Centre for Greek and Roman Antiquity, National Hellenic Research Foundation.
- Millar, Fergus (1993). The Roman Near East, 31 B.C.–A.D. 337. Harvard University Press.
- Samuel, Alan E. (1972). Greek and Roman Chronology: Calendars and Years in Classical Antiquity. C. H. Beck.
- Wasserstein, A. (1989). "A Marriage Contract from the Province of Arabia Nova: Notes on Papyrus Yadin 18". The Jewish Quarterly Review. 80 (1): 93–131. doi:10.2307/1454328. JSTOR 1454328.
