= Ahmad Al-Jallad =

American epigraphist and historian of Arabic

Ahmad Al-Jallad is an American philologist, epigraphist, and a historian of language. Some of the areas he has contributed to include Quranic studies and the history of Arabic, including recent work he has done on pre-Islamic Arabian inscriptions written in Safaitic and Paleo-Arabic. He is currently Professor in the Sofia Chair in Arabic Studies at Ohio State University at the Department of Near Eastern and South Asian Languages and Cultures. He is the decipherer of the Dhofari script of Oman. He is the winner of the 2017 Dutch Gratama Science Prize.

== Biography ==
Al-Jallad was born in Salt Lake City to a Jordanian father and a mother from Texas. As an undergraduate, he attended the University of South Florida. He entered Harvard University for his doctoral program in Semitic philology and received his Ph.D. in 2012. Two of his mentors during his studies were Michael C. A. Macdonald from the University of Oxford and John Huehnergard from Harvard University. One of his earliest achievements was reconstructing a previously unknown Arabian zodiac from pre-Islamic Arabia. He is presently considered one of the foremost authorities on the early history of the Arabic language and script and he helps direct archaeological expeditions across the Middle East.

Al-Jallad has contributed to the decipherment and interpretation of the inscriptions of Ancient Arabia, especially Safaitic, Thamudic, Dhofari, and more broadly to the history of the Arabic language and its position within the Semitic language family. He has discovered and studied a number of important texts for the history and culture of pre-Islamic Arabia, the Arabs, and the background of Islam. He is also a pioneer in the documentation and study of the Paleo-Arabic inscriptions. Alongside Karolina Jaworska, he published the first comprehensive dictionary of the Safaitic script. He is the Scientific Director and Project Manager of the OCIANA database for inscriptions of Ancient North Arabia.

== Notable publications ==
- "The Decipherment of the Dhofari Script: Three halḥam abecedaries and the first glimpses into the corpus." Jaarbericht Ex Oriente Lux (JEOL) 49, 2025, 119–147.
- “What is Ancient North Arabian?” In D. Birnstiel and N. Pat-El (eds.) Re-Engaging Comparative Semitic and Arabic Studies. Harrassowitz, 2018, 1–45
- A Dictionary of the Safaitic Inscriptions, Brill 2019.
- "The Pre-Islamic Divine Name ʿsy and the Background of the Qurʾānic Jesus," Journal of the International Qur'anic Studies Association (2021).
- The Religion and Rituals of the Nomads of Pre-Islamic Arabia, Brill, 2022. Open-access.
- “A Paleo-Arabic Inscription of a Companion of Muhammad?”Journal of Near Eastern Studies (2024)
- "The Epigraphy of the Tribe of ʿĀd" Brill, Journal of Ancient Arabia (2025)

== See also ==
- Christian J. Robin
- Laila Nehmé
