= Ri al-Zallalah inscription =

The Rīʿ al-Zallālah inscription is a pre-Islamic Paleo-Arabic inscription, likely dating to the 6th century, located near Taif, in a narrow pass that connects this city to the al-Sayl al- Kabīr wadi.

== History ==
The rock art the inscription is located on was first described by James Hamilton in 1845, although he did not include the inscriptions he saw in his publication. The inscription itself was only noticed with during the 1951–1952 Philby-Ryckmans-Lippens expedition by Adolf Grofmann, and, though he supplied a reading of the inscription, a copy was still not made. The Ṭāʾif- Mecca epigraphic survey led by Ahmad Al-Jallad and Hythem Sidky returned to the site in August 2021 and produced new photographs of the inscription, which was finally published with a new edition in 2022.

== Content ==
The inscription reads:

Transcription:

brk- [k]m rb-nʾ

ʾnʾ .rh

br sd

Arabic:

برك (ك)م ربنا

انا (ق)ره

بر سد

English:

may our Lord bless you

I am {Q}rh

son of Sd"

== Interpretation and significance ==
The Ri al-Zallalah inscription has two parts: an invocation, wishing for blessings on the audience and an authorial signature. The vocabulary used, including the verb brk ("to bless") and rb (Rabb) for "Lord" reflects the influence of Hebrew or Aramaic traditions, and is standard monotheistic vocabulary previously found in other parts of Arabia that first begins to appear in the fourth century; this is also seen in the Jabal Dabub inscription (South Arabia) and the Abd Shams inscription (northwest Arabia).

This inscription also contains the first example of a type of assimilation of short vowels known from Classical Arabic grammar.

== See also ==
- Namara inscription
- Jabal Dabub inscription
