= Pre-Islamic Arabian inscriptions =

Pre-Islamic inscriptions

Pre-Islamic Arabian inscriptions are inscriptions from the Arabian Peninsula from before Islam. These inscriptions document all the known pre-Islamic Arabian languages, including Arabic, Sabaic, Hadramautic, Minaic, Qatabanic, etc. They come in many forms, from anonymously inscribed graffiti to royally commissioned monumental inscriptions. Over 65,000 of these inscriptions are known, found on stone, metal, pottery, wood, and other surfaces. Most of these inscriptions are from North Arabia, where 50,000 inscriptions are known. The remaining 15,000 are from South Arabia.

Inscriptions are a critical source for pre-Islamic Arabian history and the context of the Quran. In recent decades, the study of pre-Islamic Arabian inscriptions has been the basis of many major discoveries, including the prevalence of pre-Islamic Arabian monotheism in the fifth and sixth centuries, the evolution of the Arabic script from the Nabataean script, and, based on their sheer number, and purpose, a widespread presence of literate societies in pre-Islamic Arabia.

== Classification ==
Inscriptions mainly come in two forms: graffiti, "self-authored personal expressions written in a public space", and monumental inscriptions, commissioned to a professional scribe by an elite for an official role.

Unlike modern graffiti, the graffiti in these inscriptions are usually signed (and so not anonymous) and were not illicit or subversive. Graffiti are usually just scratchings on the surface of rock, but both graffiti and monumental inscriptions could be produced by painting, or the use of a chisel, charcoal, brush, or other tools. These inscriptions are typically non-portable (being lapidary) and were engraved (and not painted).

Both graffiti and monumental inscriptions were intended for public display.

== Languages ==
=== South Arabian ===
Sabaic is the best attested language in South Arabian inscriptions, named after the Kingdom of Saba, and is documented over a millennium. In the linguistic history of this region, there are three main phases of the evolution of the language: Old Sabaic (10th–2nd centuries BC), Middle Sabaic (2nd century BC–mid-4th century AD), and Late Sabaic (mid-4th century AD–eve of Islam). The final Sabaic inscription discovered is from the mid-5th century AD, during the final years of the Himyarite Kingdom. Some Sabaic inscriptions have also been found in Ethiopia, and these are classified as Ethiopic Sabaic. Sabaic and Arabic may have been mutually intelligible.

Hadramitic is attested in hundreds of inscriptions over a millennium, and is known from the region of Hadramaut, or modern eastern Yemen.

Qatabanic is more seldom attested, including on some pottery shards. Inscriptions in this language are found from the Qataban kingdom, principally at its capital Timna and the surrounding necropolis.

Minaic, known from the Ma'in kingdom of the Minaeans, is first documented in the 8th century BC. Although the primary site of attestation is at the kingdom, Minaic inscriptions have also been discovered in northwestern Arabia and Egypt, and this has been linked to a flourishing Minaean trade.

=== Nabataean and Arabic ===
In the Nabataean kingdom, both Aramaic and Arabic were used as spoken languages. The Nabataean script was used to write down the Nabataean Aramaic language, which was originally derived from Imperial Aramaic. Over the centuries, the Nabataean script evolved into a Nabataean Arabic intermediary, and this script evolved into Paleo-Arabic, which is when the Arabic script entered its recognizably current form in the pre-Islamic era.

Arabic was spoken as early as the early 1st millennium BC attested by cuneiform inscriptions). Pre-Islamic Arabic is called Old Arabic. Old Arabic was mainly written down in these scripts: Safaitic, Hismaic, Nabataean Aramaic, Nabataean Arabic, and Paleo-Arabic. Other scripts were used to write Arabic much more occasionally, including: the Greek script, Ancient South Arabian scripts, and Dadanitic.

=== Syriac ===
Inscriptions in the Syriac language have been found in eastern and southern Arabia. In the eastern region of the peninsula, Syriac inscriptions are connected to the historical region of Beth Qatraye, which had a large East Syrian presence from the fourth to ninth centuries. In recent decades, Syriac inscriptions have been found in Kuwait, Bahrain, and on the Kharg Island (near Iran). In the south, two inscriptions in the Najran area have been discovered, dating to the 6th–7th and 9th–10th centuries, respectively.

=== Ethiopic ===
Six inscriptions in Ethiopic (Ge'ez) have been found in pre-Islamic Arabia. All six appear to have been written in South Arabia during the reign of Kaleb of Aksum in the early 6th century, and it is Kaleb's speech that they all narrate. These inscriptions describe Kaleb's military invasion and conquest of Himyar and contain many religious references, including mentions of biblical figures like Jesus, Mary, and David, and several scriptural quotations (including Isaiah 22:22–23, Psalms 65:16 and 68:2, Matthew 6:33, and with less certainty, Genesis 15:7).

== Scripts ==
There are three main scripts (writing systems) that were used for writing down pre-Islamic inscriptions.

1. Ancient South Arabian (ASA): includes Sabaic, Minaic, Qatabanic, and Ḥaḍramitic
2. Ancient North Arabian (ANA): includes all South Semitic scripts not covered by ASA, such as Taymanitic or Thamudic B
3. Nabataean (which evolved into the Arabic script)

The ASA script was written in one of two forms, known as the monumental (musnad) and the minuscule (zabūr) form. The monumental form was created on hard surfaces such as bronze or rock. The minuscule form was created on perishable surfaces such as palm-bark or sticks and used for day-to-day purpose documents. The minuscule form was only discovered in the 1970s and was deciphered in the late 1980s. It is only known from South Arabia.

Unlike ASA, ANA is not a homogeneous group. The designation refers to a wide number of scripts representing many languages which have yet to be properly classified and distinguished.

== South Arabia ==
=== Number and location of inscriptions ===
There are 15,000 inscriptions known from pre-Islamic South Arabia. Of these, 7,500 have been digitized into the Corpus of South Arabian Inscriptions (CSAI) project. In total, the number of published inscriptions has been given as 10,000 or over 12,000. Of all South Arabian languages, Sabaic is represented by the largest number of inscriptions (6,500). The single most important site or building from which South Arabian inscriptions have been discovered is the Temple of Awwam, where over 800 have been found. Another 700 are known from the Marib oasis. The number of inscriptions continues to grow rapidly: in the Jawf in South Arabia, the corpus of known inscriptions doubled roughly between the years 2000 to 2020, with over a thousand new ones coming to light.

Geographically, the vast majority of these inscriptions come from modern-day Yemen. However, some inscriptions composed in the Ancient South Arabian script also come from southwestern Oman, northern Arabia, Ethiopia, Egypt, and even the Aegean island of Delos, off the coast of Greece. The minuscule zabūr script, only known from Yemen, is attested in about 900 published inscriptions, with a large number still unpublished.

The South Arabian corpus of inscriptions is more extensive than that of Ugarit or Phoenicia in Punic, Aramaic, and Hebrew. It is second only in size to Akkadian, but remains behind in the field of Semitic studies due to a lack of accessible tools. These inscriptions suggest a copious literature once existed in the area, but it has not survived, likely because it was written on perishable materials.

=== Purpose and use ===
==== Content ====
All South Arabian languages, despite their linguistic differences, used a common monumental, alphabetic script with 29 consonants. The monumental script was designed to use simple geometric forms and be placed on texts for public display, mostly in sanctuaries, but also on house walls, altars, wells, irrigation works, and prominent places on rock outcrops. This public display, in turn, greatly shaped the content that was placed onto them. These texts can be extremely long and detailed and lay the foundations for understanding the history of the South Arabian kingdoms: they tell us about the organization of their polities, their economic and legal foundations, they offer an understanding of the social groups in the region, including kings, tribal leaders, functionaries, tribal members, and client associations. They document the gods worshiped and represent an invaluable source for the history of political events and the topography. The minuscule script, by contrast, was written on palm leaf ribs and other types of wood. They offer little resemblance to the monumental scripts. About 870 of them have been published, but only 350 translated, as the individual letters are ambiguous and the vocabulary remains mostly unknown. Minuscule scripts were not intended for public display, but instead for rapid notation and archiving, as their content shows. They pertain to everyday legal and economic life. They include certificates, receipts, writing exercises, and some cultic records. The minuscule inscriptions are comparable to Mesopotamian clay tablets or Egyptian papyri. The fact that they were written on wood makes it possible to chronologically organize them using radiocarbon dating.

The beginning of the study of the minuscule script is very recent, having been deciphered in the 1980s.

==== Main types ====
Most South Arabian inscriptions are short or fragmentary. The largest number are graffiti. On the other hand, several thousand more elaborate inscriptions. The longest of them, J 576+577, has over 1,300 word units. The longer inscriptions are characterized by their purpose and the formulae they utilize. They can be divided into the following categories:

- Dedicatory or votive inscriptions. Number around 2,500, half are in Sabaic. The content regularly has the scheme PN hqny GN X, "PN has dedicated to (the deity) GN (the object) X". The formula is often followed by circumstantial content with a lengthy historic account concerning the cause surrounding the erection of the structure that the inscription is associated with. They are a major source for the reconstruction of the political history of South Arabia.
- Building inscriptions. Number about 1,000, with three fourths in Sabaic. The building inscriptions employ the formula bny or brʾ, meaning "(NN) has built".
- Public announcements of decrees and legal affairs. Numbering about 400 (70% Sabaic). Content is usually relates to social and religious life.
- Commemorative inscriptions. Fewer in number than any other category. Among these are some of the longest "Res gestae", or things done types of accounts, produced by kings to document what was accomplished during their reign.

== Poetry ==
To date, eight pre-Islamic poems are known from inscriptions discovered in Yemen. Summarized by Daum, Abdullah, and Mutahhar ibn al-Iryani:

"Six have been published: ZI 11 from Mārib, the Hymn to the Sun from Qāniya (dated by Stein to the late first century AD), a building text from Wadi Šurjān—so pronounced, not Širjān (van Lessen 24 = Jamme 2353), a cursive text from the Munich collection (X. BSB 187—Stein, 2010, p. 607ss.), an inscription from Ḫawlān al‐ Ṭiyāl (MS‐Šiǧā’ 2), engraved together with other inscriptions that deal with the ritual hunt, and inscription MA 16 from Mārib (Multhoff, 2021, p. 315s.). Two more texts from the Awām temple, discovered in 2004 by the AFSM, numbered MB 2004 I‐95 and MB 2004 SI‐8 (personal communication of Mohammed Maraqten), remain unpublished. The poems span the period from the fifth or third century BC to the third century AD."

One of the earliest is the Hymn of Qāniya, a first century poem addressed to the goddess Shams that is 27 lines long. Every line in the poem ends in the rhyme -hk. Another poem comes from a Middle Sabaic vote inscription Zaid Inan 11 (ZI 11) from Marib. A rock inscription VL 24 = Ja 2353 from Wadi Shirjān contains a rhymed poem 10 lines long. The first line is introductory, followed by nine lines of text.

Beyond South Arabia, a Safaitic poem has been discovered by Ahmad Al-Jallad. According to Al-Jallad, the poem is six lines long and is a war song. Aside from this text, only one other literary composition is known in Safaitic, which is a fragment of the Baal Cycle.

== Databases and digital resources ==
A growing number of open access web resources are available for accessing and reading pre-Islamic Arabian inscriptions, often with photographs, transliterations, translations, and detailed metadata. These resources are essential tools for both specialists and non-specialists interested in the languages, scripts, and historical contexts of ancient Arabia.

OCIANA (Online Corpus of the Inscriptions of Ancient North Arabia) is the most comprehensive and widely used digital resource for Ancient North Arabian inscriptions. Maintained by the Ohio State University and collaborating institutions, OCIANA provides a curated corpus of inscriptions written in scripts such as Safaitic, Hismaic, Dadanitic, Taymanitic, and related traditions. Entries for each inscription include high-quality images (or drawings, when photographs are unavailable), a transliteration, English translation, bibliographic references, and geographic information equipped with interactive maps. OCIANA enables inscriptions to be studied thematically (genealogy, religion, warfare), geographically, or linguistically, and does not require prior training in Semitic epigraphy to use.

DASI (Digital Archive for the Study of pre-Islamic Arabian Inscriptions) is a research platform for South and North Arabian inscriptions. DASI integrates Sabaic, Minaic, Qatabanic, Hadramitic, and Ancient North Arabian inscriptions. Its entries usually include philological commentary, variant readings, and links between related texts.

DiCoNab (Digital Corpus of the Nabataean and Developing Arabic Inscriptions) focuses on Nabataean Aramaic inscriptions and texts that illustrate the transition toward early Arabic script and language. Hosted by the University of Oxford, DiCoNab provides images, transliterations, translations, and linguistic annotations, and is geared for understanding the evolution of Aramaic-based scripts into Arabic writing. DiCoNab complements OCIANA by covering a different but historically connected epigraphic tradition, especially in the northern and northwestern Arabian regions.

CSAI (Corpus of South Arabian Inscriptions) is a comprehensive digital repository dedicated to the preservation and study of the written heritage of pre-Islamic South Arabia, primarily from modern-day Yemen. Developed by the University of Pisa, it provides a searchable database of thousands of inscriptions in various Old South Arabian languages, such as Sabaic and Qatabanic, spanning from the late 2nd millennium BC to the 6th century AD.

== Limitations as sources ==
Certain challenges exist in studying pre-Islamic Arabia with inscriptions. First, not all communities expressed themselves through a culture of inscribing their writings on rock. Second, the content of inscriptions is often formulaic. Nevertheless, many formula were used and the phrasings become formula (widely employed) because they help encode the beliefs and attitudes of the authors. Third, inscriptions can be destroyed by weather or human activity. Therefore, inscriptions known today may not be a full representation of those originally created.

== See also ==
- Archaeology of the Arabian Peninsula
- List of Arabic Inscriptions
- Pre-Islamic Arabic poetry
