= Christian community of Najran =

Historical Eastern Christian community in southern Arabia

The Christians of Najran were the most notable community of Christians in pre-Islamic Arabia, rising in the period of Arabia in late antiquity. Christianity appears to have spread into the region by the fifth century, if not earlier. In some Islamic tradition, Najran is thought to have been the site that allowed Christianity to first get a foothold in South Arabia. Najran was the home of several Christian bishops as well, including the legendary Quss Ibn Sa'ida al-Iyadi, a contemporary of and possible influence on Muhammad. Some traditions suggest the existence of a Kaaba of Najran, which had a similar architectural style to the Kaaba of Mecca.

The Christians of Najran are best known for having been persecuted and massacred during the reign of the Jewish Himyarite king, Dhu Nuwas. The outrage that followed in the international Christian community made this what has described as "the most widely broadcast episode of the early sixth century," with the works written on it now forming an important source for the history of the community. The massacre also instigated an invasion of the Himyarite Kingdom by its Christian neighbour, the Ethiopian Aksumite Kingdom, ushering in an era of Christian rule over South Arabia during much of the sixth century. The Christians of Najran persisted, and are said to have sent a delegation that met with the Islamic prophet Muhammad, who allowed them to worship in his mosque, and their interaction is believed to be the occasion in which Surah 112 of the Quran was revealed. The Quranic story of the People of the Ditch in Surah 85 is also often interpreted as recounting the massacre of Najran's Christians.

== Primary sources ==
The Christian sources that talk about the Christian community at Najran primarily revolve around the persecutions of this community in the early sixth century by Dhu Nuwas. These sources include two letters attributed to Simeon of Beth Arsham, Jacob of Serugh's Letter to the Himyarites, the Book of the Himyarites, and the Martyrdom of Arethas.

== Introduction of Eastern Christianity ==
Historically, the introduction of Eastern Christianity into Najran must have occurred by the fifth century, possibly through trade routes. Several late sources suggest different beginnings for the Christians of Najran. According to the Chronicle of Seert, Christianity was introduced into the area around 450 when a Christian merchant from the city named Hannan travelled to Constantinople, and then Al-Hira, where he converted and was baptised. Upon returning to Najran, he began sharing his faith with others in the community, who also began to convert. Ibn Ishaq offers a different story: a Christian Syrian named Faymiyun ended up as a slave in Najran. His manner of praying shocked the Najran community, leading to a mass conversion. Other versions of the story also permeated the Arab-Islamic tradition, some focusing on the miracles of a man named Abdallah ibn Tahmir, to whom Fimiyyun ministered, and another centered on the secret conversion of a Himyarite king. Another legend attributes the founding of the Christian community of Najran to a man named Phemion. Though the details about Christianity's introduction into the area are unclear, it is possible that it was passed along the trade routes of Al-Hira. Several explicitly Christian inscriptions are known from the Hima Paleo-Arabic inscriptions, located at a site near Najran, with the texts dates covering the late fourth to early fifth centuries.

== Bishops and holy sites ==
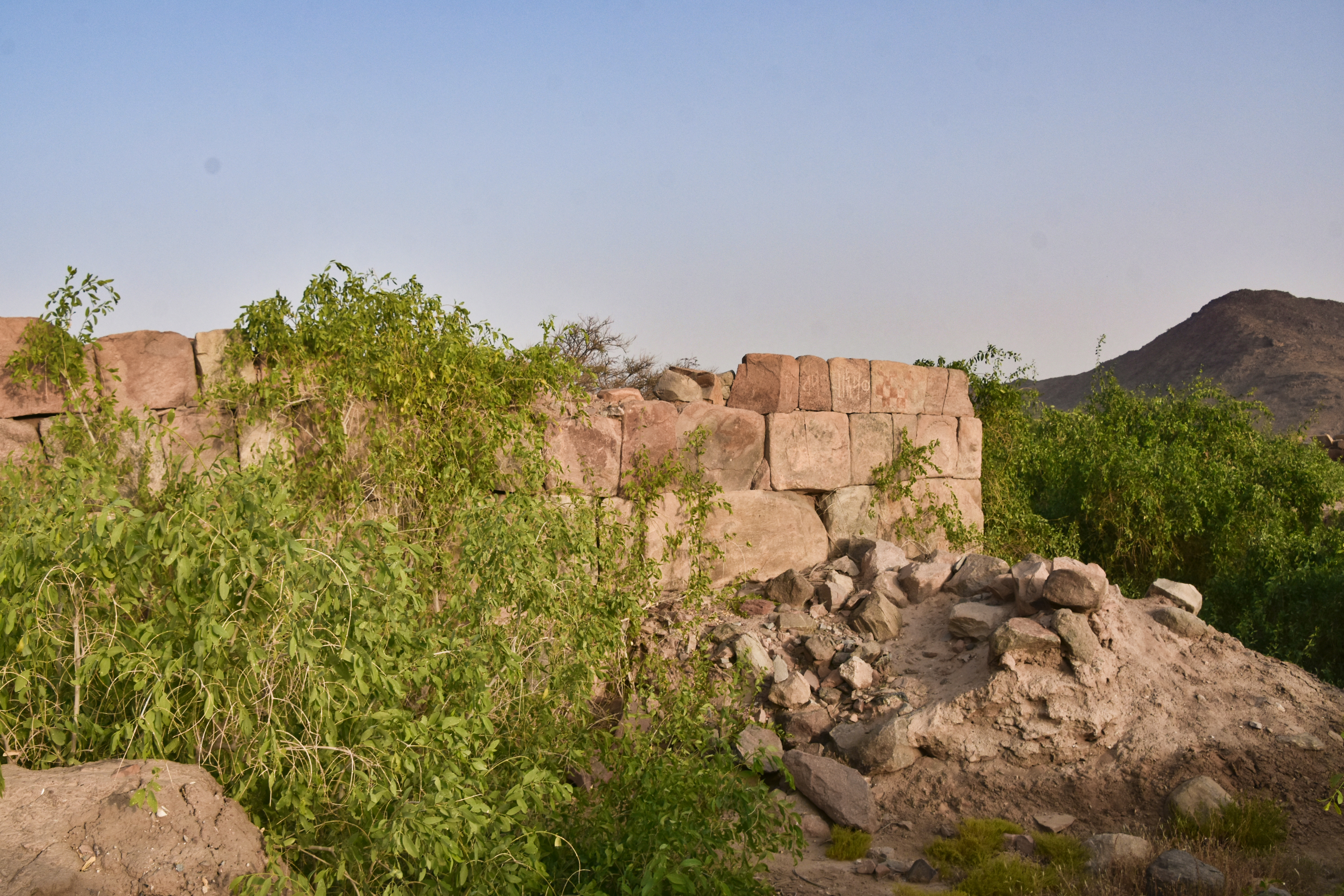
Ruins of the Kaaba Najran near the ruins of Al-Okhdood

The first mention of bishops of Najran is in a letter from Simeon, the bishop of Beth Arsham, written in 524. According to Simeon, Philoxenus of Mabbug consecrated two bishops, both called Mar Pawlos (Paul). Both died during the massacre, the first during the siege of Zafar, and the second in Najran before its final surrender to Dhu Nuwas. The consecration being done by Philoxenus, a leading member of the Syrian Orthodox Church, indicates a Miaphysite, non-Chalcedonian Christianity at Najran. Other bishops are mentioned in Islamic sources, including the legendary Quss Ibn Sa'ida al-Iyadi, a contemporary of Muhammad, who came to preach the great market of Mina and the Sūq ʿUkāẓ.

The Church of Najran was called the Kaaba of Najran. This Kaaba drew worshippers for some 40 years during Pre-Islamic Arabia. The Arabian sources single out Khath'am, a Christian tribe which used to perform the pilgrimage to the site.

== Persecutions and massacre ==
The Christians had suffered a brief stint of persecution with the advent of the new dynasty under the Himyarite ruler Sharhabil Yakkuf. In the Martyrdom of Azqir, a missionary known as Azqir tried to convert the king, and was instead ordered executed for "introducing a new religion." After concluding the story of Azqir's life and execution, the Martyrdom reports that around 40 other Christians had also been martyred, including bishops, priests, monks, and lay people.

Hima inscription proclaiming Dhu Nuwas' violent exploits near Najran

After the death of the king, Yusuf As'ar Yath'ar (known as Dhu Nuwas for his sidelocks) was appointed to the throne. In a reversal of policy, Yusuf launched a campaign which massacred an Aksumite garrison in Zafar, where a church was set on fire, then invaded the Tihāma coastal lowlands and he took over key centres as far as the Bab el-Mandeb. He sent one of his generals, a Jewish prince, north to Najran in order to impose an economic blockade on the oasis by cutting off the trade route to Qaryat al-Faw in eastern Arabia.

In 523, Dhu Nuwas killed nearly hundred thousand Christians in Najran, reportedly in retribution for the burning of a synagogue. Dhu Nuwas killed nearly hundred thousand Christians These circumstances had a geopolitical dimension as well; Jewish communities and Nestorian Christians had connections with the Iranian Sassanid kingdom, while the Miaphysite Christians were linked to Byzantine and Aksumite interests. When Dhu Nuwas ordered the Himyarites to provide him troops, the Miaphysite Christians of Najran refused. Dhu Nuwas sent out officials to offer a truce in exchange for voluntary surrender. Instead, once the representatives for the community identified themselves, Dhu Nuwas ordered the execution of the rebels and their families. Their bodies were piled in a church and burned. The prefect of Najran, Arethas, was among those killed. He is remembered as a saint in the Catholic tradition and as a martyr in Islam. There are three Sabaic inscriptions which refer to the event: Ry 507, Ry 508, and Ja 1028.

The details of this incident are debated, and the event itself has been heavily mythologized. This effect can be seen in the death toll, which varies widely from 200, as recorded shortly afterward, to 70,000 in sources written centuries later. Popular religious narratives purport that Dhu Nuwas gave the Christians of Najran the choice of conversion to Judaism or death, and that when they refused to renounce their faith, they were burned alive. Modern scholarship questions both the religious motive and the manner of execution. It is possible that those killed were executed by sword and their bodies burned afterward. Inscriptions written Himyarite military officers make no reference to the religion of the Najranites. 21st century scholars have understood this massacre as an episode of brutal political repression, rather than religious persecution.

=== Fall of Dhu Nuwas ===
Dhu Nuwas's military campaign against the Byzantine-allied Christians of Najran brought swift retribution. The emperor of Byzantium, Justin I, requested his ally, the Abyssinian ruler Kaleb of Axum, to invade Najran, kill Dhu Nuwas, and annex Himyar. According to the Book of the Himyarites, Najrani Christian refugees (including one by the name of Umayyah) arrived in Aksum and requested aid from its king. In either case, the Abyssinians sent an army of 7,000 men led by Abraha, the Christian viceroy of the Negus of Axum, defeated Himyarite forces. Dhu Nuwas is said to have ridden his horse into the sea rather than be killed by Byzantine forces. The seizure of the throne by Abraha signified a return to Christian rule in Najran, and with it a period of retaliatory persecution against Himyar's Jews.

=== Memory and legacy ===
The persecution of Christians in Najran has left a legacy in both Christian literature as well as in the Quran.

Simeon of Beth Arsham's second letter on the Najran massacre is unique for its focus on the women martyrs, who he says rushed to join "our parents and brothers and sisters who have died for the sake of Christ our lord." According to one memorably gruesome episode mentioned in it, after seeing her Christian kinsmen burned alive, Ruhm, a great noblewoman of Najran, brings her daughter before the Himyarite king and instructs him: "Cut off our heads, so that we may go join our brothers and my daughter's father." The executioners comply, slaughtering her daughter and granddaughter before Ruhm's eyes and forcing her to drink her blood. The king then asks, "How does your daughter's blood taste to you?" The woman replies, "Like a pure spotless offering: that is what it tasted like in my mouth and in my soul."

In one exchange, reminiscent of the Acts of Marta and her father Pusai, a freeborn woman of Najran named Habsa bint Hayyan taunts Dhu Nuwas with the memory of her father:

Habsa told him, "I am the daughter of Hayyan, of the family of Hayyan, the teacher by whose hand our lord sowed Christianity in this land. My father is Hayyan who once burned your synagogues". Masruq the Crucifier (Dhu Nuwas), said to her, "So, you have the same ideas as your father? I suppose you too would be ready to burn our synagogues just as your father did." Habsa told him, "No! I am not going to burn it down because I am prepared to follow quickly this path of martyrdom in the footsteps of my brothers in Christ. But we have confidence in the justice of Jesus Christ our Lord and our God, that he will swiftly bring an end to your rule and make it disappear from amongst mankind: he will bring low your pride and your life, and he will uproot your synagogues from our lands, and build there holy churches. Christianity will increase and rule here, through the grace of our Lord and through the prayers of our parents and brothers and sisters who have died for the sake of Christ our Lord. Whereas you and all who belong to your people will become a byword that will cause future generations to wonder, because of all that you, a godless and merciless man, have wrought upon the holy churches and upon those who worship Christ God."

The martyrs of Najran are often thought to be mentioned in the Quran (85:4–8):

...slain were the men of the pit (Al-Ukhdood),

the fire abounding in fuel, when they were seated over it, and were themselves witnesses of what they did with the believers. They took revenge on them because they believed in God

the All-mighty, the All-laudable...

The stories of the Najran deaths spread quickly to other Christian realms, where they were recounted in terms of heroic martyrdom for the cause of Christ. Their martyrdom led to Najran becoming a major pilgrimage centre that, for a time, rivaled Mecca to the north. The leader of the Arabs of Najran who was executed during the period of persecution, Al-Harith, was canonized by the Roman Catholic Church as St. Aretas.

The Martyrdom of the Christians of Najran is celebrated in the Roman Calendar on 24 October; in the Jacobite Menologies on 31 December; in the Arabic Feasts of the Melkites on 2 October; in the Armenian Synaxarium on 20 October, and in the Ethiopian Senkesar on 22 November.

== Islamic era ==
Starting in the 7th century, Islam spread in Arabia. The Christians of Najran would interact with Muhammad and later Muslims.

=== Delegation to Muhammad ===
Around 631, Muhammad began sending letters to various communities, inviting them to convert to Islam. Such a letter was also sent to the Christians of Najran; it was delivered by Khaled ibn al-Walid and Ali ibn Abi Talib. When the Christians did not convert, Muhammad sent Al-Mughira to explain Islam further to the Christians of Najran. In response, the Christians sent a delegation of 60 people (including 45 scholars) to visit Muhammad in Medina. Among them were Abdul Masih of Bani Kinda, their chief, and Abdul Harith, bishop of Bani Harith. Muhammad permitted Christians to pray in his mosque, which they did, turning towards the east.

When the delegation arrived, Muhammad allowed them to pray in his mosque. Some Muslims were reportedly uncomfortable with Muhammad allowing the Christians to pray in a mosque. The Christians are said to have prayed facing the East. Muhammad also provided them with a place to stay.

The Christians delegation tried to convert Muhammad to Christianity and the two sides entered into a debate. Muhammad concluded that some Christian teachings were incompatible with Islam and that Islam was the true religion. Though both sides failed to convince the other, they nevertheless worked out a mutually acceptable relationship, and entered a treaty of peace.

The Treaty of Najran guaranteed to the Christians security for "their lives, their religion and their property". It gave Christians freedom of religion, stipulating that there would be no interference in the practice of Christianity, nor would any cross be destroyed. While the Christians were required to pay a tax (jizya) they would not have to pay a tithe (ushr). The tax on them was not to exceed the means of a Christian. Muhammad also stated "The Muslims must not abandon the Christians, neglect them, and leave them without help and assistance since I have made this pact with them on behalf of Allah."

The treaty was significant politically and economically. By leaving local leaders intact, Muhammad cultivated new allies and facilitated tax collection.

=== Expulsion under Umar ===
There are reports that the second Caliph Umar ibn al-Khattab ordered Christians of Najran to vacate the city and emigrate out of the Arabian peninsula, based on Muhammad's orders. However, the historicity of this is disputed, and there is historical evidence that Christians continued to live in the area for at least 200 more years. It may be that the orders of Umar were not carried out or might have applied only to Christians living in Najran itself, not to those settled round about. Some migrated to Syria, likely in the district of Trachonitis (the Lajat plain) and around the extant city of Najran, Syria; but the greater part settled in the vicinity of Al-Kufa in predominantly Christian Southern Iraq, where the colony of Al-Najraniyyah long maintained the memory of their expatriation.

=== Najran accord of 897 ===
The Christian community of Najran still had considerable political weight in the late ninth century. According to a Yemeni Arab source, the first Zaydite Imam of Yemen, al-Hadi Ila l-Haqq Yahya ibn al-Hussain (897–911) concluded an accord with the Christians and the Jews of the oasis on 897, at the time of the foundation of the Zaydite principality.

A second Yemeni source alludes to the Christians of Najran in muharram 390 (999–1000). The oasis was still one-third Christian and one-third Jewish, according to the testimony of the Persian traveller, Ibn al-Mujawir.

=== Decline ===
Eventually, the Old Najran, which was Christian, disappeared, and is now represented by Al-Ukhdood, a desolate village. At the same time, another Najran, which is Islamic, has now appeared in its vicinity.

== See also ==
- Arethas (martyr)
- Najran, Syria
