= Quss Ibn Sa'ida al-Iyadi =

Arabian bishop

Quss Ibn Sa'ida al-Iyadi (Arabic: قس بن ساعدة الإيادي; d. c.. 610 AD) was a pre-Islamic Arabian bishop of Najran, which is located in Saudi Arabia. He lived in the 6th and early 7th centuries, and his genealogy took him back to the North Arabian Iyad tribe. He was famous for his eloquence in his poetry, rhymed prose (saj'), sermons, and rhetoric, and Quss was held up as a model for literary excellence, if not the greatest orator of all the tribes. One of his sermons has survived, and his ascribed oeuvre has been collected. A proverb known from a 717 AD Meccan inscription is occasionally attributed to him too. Quss was a preacher of both theology and Christianity. Quss was a sage, judge, and more. When he died, he was buried in north Syria, probably at Mount Simon. Sources differ in saying how long he lived, some saying he reached the age of 380, others 600 or 700, old enough to have known the disciples of Jesus. He is considered a legendary or, at least, a semi-legendary figure, and is only known from Muslim sources. Islamic writers including Ibn Abd Rabbihi, Al-Masudi, Al-Bayhaqi, and Abu Hayyan al-Tawhidi say that Quss met with the Byzantine emperor Heraclius (r. 610–641) to discuss ethics concerned with Christianity, life in this world, and life in the next world. Some modern historians have speculated that Quss was an Arian.

Quss became a cultural hero in Arab culture. Literature was written about him, like the Hadith Quss Ibn Sa’ida ('The Story of Quss Ibn Sa’ida'). He became the subject of proverbs, like ablagh min Quss – 'more eloquent than Quss', or adha min Quss – 'more intelligent than Quss'. "Qussi", or "Qussian", evolved into an alternative manner in signifying excellence. In Shia sources, he was said to have prophesied the Twelve Imams. Until recently, Arabic students memorized his surviving sermon by heart. In 2012, a "Festival of Quss Ibn Sa’ida" was held in Najran.

As a cultural hero, Quss became a part of the awāʾil genre of Islamic literature, which identifies certain figures as being the first to have held a belief or developed a practice. According to the Kitāb al-ʿawāʾil ('The Book of Pioneers') of the renowned philologist and writer Abu Hilal al-Askari (died 1010), Quss was the first to believe in the one God of Mecca before Islam and believe in Resurrection. In addition to Quss, Al-Shahrastani (died 1153) also cites his contemporaries Waraqah ibn Nawfal and Zayd ibn Amr as among the first Arab monotheists. This list is repeated by Al-Suyuti (died 1505). As Al-Askari goes on, Quss was the first to lean on a staff, a notion that contains implications of prophetic resemblance (such as to the Staff of Moses). Quss was the first to use the amma bad phrase, an expression that usually occurs at the beginning or near the beginning of khutbas (sermons), wasiyyas (testaments) and risalas (letters). Along with Quss, other attributions for the "first" of this tradition included David and Muhammad's grandfather Abd al-Muttalib. Quss's placement alongside men of this stature indicate that he was seen highly among Islamic authors. He is also first to write the min Fulan ila Fulan formula ('from Such and Such to Such and Such'), this being the most popular manner in opening letters. Quss is also said to have invented a juridical rule whereby "proof is incumbent on the plaintiff and the defendant who denies his guilt must speak an oath".

== Quss and Muhammad ==
Encounters between Muhammad and Quss are reported in Islamic tradition. These are said to have occurred in the marketplace of Ukaz, which is near Mecca. Quss would preach in this marketplace, hoping to bring people to Christianity. Muhammad is said to have listened in on some of his sermons, with this happening before Muhammad's first revelation in 610 in some sources, or before the Hijrah in 622 in others. Irfan Shahid argues that Muhammad's encounter with Christian preachers in Ukaz, especially Quss, would have served as an important and natural way for Muhammad to have become familiar with Christian tradition. Shahid also argues that Quss would have acted as a natural source of stylistic influence on Muhammad. Nicholson writes:

At ‘Ukádh, we are told, the youthful Muhammad listened, as though spellbound, to the eloquence of Quss b. Sá῾ida, Bishop of Najrán; and he may have contrasted the discourse of the Christian preacher with the brilliant odes chanted by heathen bards.

Quss is said to have been one of the Christians most praised by Muhammad. According to one hadith, when Quss preached "indeed, there is no religion with God which is better than the religion that you follow", Muhammad "invoked divine mercy upon [Quss] and said: 'he shall be raised up on judgment day as a separate nation'." When Muhammad learned that Quss died, he recited one of his speeches that he heard at Ukaz. He had someone (Abu Bakr or someone else) remind him of some lines he forgot. Muhammad is also said to have exclaimed "I hope that on the Day of Resurrection, he will return to life and form a people of his own".

== Rhymed prose ==
Quss was a composer of saj' (rhymed prose). As translated by Qutbuddin, the following are compositions attributed to him:

O People! Listen and retain! He who lives dies. He who dies is lost [forever]. Everything that could happen will happen. A dark night…a bright day…a sky that has zodiacal sign…stars that shine…seas [whose waters] roar…mountains firmly anchored...an earth spread out…rivers made to flow. Indeed, there are signs in the sky. There are lessons in the earth. What is the state of the people—going and never returning? Have they been satisfied, thus choosing to reside [there]? Or were they abandoned, [are they] sleeping? Quss swears an oath by God in which there is no sin: God has a religion that is more satisfactory to Him and better than the religion in which you believe. Indeed, you do evil deeds.

In those that went before in eons past, are instances for us to take heed. When I looked at the watering holes of death, from which there is no returning—[When] I saw my people towards them going, young and old—The one who passed not coming back to me and not from those who remain, he who goes. I became convinced that I—without a doubt—will go where the people have gone.

Another translation of some of the material attributed to Quss is by Dadoo:

O People! Listen and heed! Once you have heeded, benefit from it! Each one who lives will die. And he who dies will go into oblivion. Everything that is to transpire shall come to pass. In the rains and vegetation, sustenance and provisions, mothers and fathers, living and dead, groups and individuals, are recurring signs. There is information to be gained from the skies and admonition from the earth as well as in dark nights, and in the heavens with constellations, and in the earth with gateways and the oceans with waves. Why do I see people going; never to return? Were they pleased with their status that they could live on? Or did they leave behind items there that they could sleep on? Quss swears an unblemished oath in God's name: God has a religion more beloved to Him than the one you observe. The time for a new prophet’s arrival has come. His era has already cast its shadow over you. And He has made you understand his epoch. Glad tidings be to the one that believed in him and his guidance; and cursed be he that disobeys him and rebels against him. Cursed be the leaders of negligence among preceding generations and times. O people of Iyād! Where are the people of Thamūd and the ᷾Ād? Where is the sick person and his visitor? And the mighty pharaohs? Where is the one that built and fortified buildings; and embellished and reinforced them? Did wealth and children deceive him? Where is the oppressor who amassed wealth and stored it; and then said ‘I am your lord most high?’ Were they not wealthier than you, and aspired to more things than you and had longer lives than you? The dust pulverised them and destroyed them with its extended reach. There lie their decayed bones and their vacant homes in which only howling wolves live. Indeed! God is the only one worthy of worship; without father or son.

Michael Sells has argued that this style

contains many of the features found in the short-verse, apocalyptic suras [of the Quran] ascribed to the first period of qurʾānic prophecy: intense use of rhyme along with striking shifts in rhyme; highly rhythmic but not strictly metric verses; and the feature notable in passages such as Sūra 82:1–6 of several very short, staccato verses of adjuration followed by a longer versed and assonance-rich proclamation.

== Attributed works ==
A considerable body of writings has been attributed to Quss throughout the Islamic medieval tradition. These attributions can be sorted into a number of genres consisting of short orations, sapiential dialogues, ethical testaments (waṣāyā), legal and rhetorical maxims, and brief poems. These writings are preserved across classical Sunni adab, sīrah, hadith, and Imāmī Shiʿi literature. Modern scholarship treats does not treat this corpus as authentic.

=== Orations ===
The best-known, and most famous attributed work to Quss is the sermon he is said to have delivered at the market of ʿUkāẓ, which circulates in three main textual streams:

- Adab recension: A concise saj' (rhymed prose) exhortation on mortality, cosmic signs, and perished nations, preserved in al-Jāḥiẓ's al-Bayān wa-l-tabyīn, al-Masʿūdī's Murūj al-dhahab, Ibn ʿAbd Rabbih's al-ʿIqd al-farīd, and Abū l-Faraj al-Iṣfahānī's Kitāb al-Aghānī.
- Ḥadīth and Dalāʾil recensions: Longer versions framed by a delegation of the Iyad or Abd al-Qays tribes visiting Muhammad, expanding the sermon with oaths and eschatological statements anticipating a coming prophet. These recensions are known from the works of al-Ṭabarānī (al-Muʿjam al-kabīr) and Abū Bakr al-Bayhaqī (Dalāʾil al-nubuwwah) and they have been collated with variant chains of transmission by Ibn Kathīr (al-Bidāyah wa-l-nihāyah).
- Imāmī Shiʿi recensions: Al-Shaykh al-Ṣadūq (Kamāl al-dīn wa-tamām al-niʿmah) and works attributed to al-Shaykh al-Mufīd (Kitāb al-Ikhtiṣāṣ and al-Amālī) preserve variant accounts of the ʿUkāẓ tradition that emphasize the longevity of Quss and his practice of taqiyya.

Separate from the ʿUkāẓ cycle, Imāmī sources (including al-ʿAyyāshī and Ibn Shahrāshūb in the Manāqib Āl Abī Ṭālib) preserve a rain-prayer oration (khuṭbat al-istisqāʾ) transmitted on the authority of Salman the Persian, in which a series of cryptic invocations by Quss become glossed as references to the Imams in later Shi'i exegesis.

=== Dialogues, testaments, and awāʾil ===
Two prominent prose dialogues are also attributed to Quss. The first, the Ḥadīth Quss maʿa Qayṣar ("The Discourse of Quss with Caesar"), depicts a question-and-answer exchange before the Byzantine emperor on topics like intellect, knowledge, chivalry, and governance. It was transmitted in Abū ʿAlī al-Qālī's al-Amālī, Ibn ʿAbd Rabbih's al-ʿIqd al-farīd, and the longest recension of it where Quss is known as the bishop of Najran is Ibrāhīm ibn Muḥammad al-Bayhaqī's al-Maḥāsin wa-l-masāwiʾ. The second appears in Abū Bakr al-Bayhaqī's Dalāʾil al-nubuwwah and Ibn Kathīr's al-Bidāyah wa-l-nihāyah, recounting an encounter with Quss in the wilderness beside two graves and a place of worship, where he condemns the abandonment of Abrahamic monotheism.

Short ethical testaments (waṣāyā) and awa'il ("firsts") attributions are widely cited across biographical and lexicographical works. Abū Hilāl al-ʿAskarī's Kitāb al-Awāʾil preserves Quss's counsel to his son against seeking advice from anyone distracted, hungry, afraid, or anxious, alongside his reputed innovations in epistolary formulas and pulpit delivery. Al-Ṭabarī (in his History of the Prophets and Kings) and Al-Maydānī (Majmaʿ al-amthāl) record famous sayings which were thought to potentially go back to Quss himself, including the transitional phrase ammā baʿd to Quss and the judicial burden-of-proof maxim expressed via the Arabic proverb ablagh min Quss ("more eloquent than Quss"). Abū Ḥātim al-Sijistānī's Kitāb al-Muʿammarīn (cited by Ibn Ḥajar al-ʿAsqalānī in al-Iṣābah and al-Baghdādī in Khizānat al-adab) records traditions concerning Quss's longevity.

=== Poetry ===
Several short poems, predominantly elegiac, ascetic, or eschatological in theme, are attributed to Quss across a wide range of writings and compilations.

Major poems attributed to Quss ibn Sāʿidah in classical sources
Incipit (Arabic and transliteration)	Meter and theme	Primary classical witnesses
فِي الذَّاهِبِينَ الأَوَّلِينَ مِنَ القُرُونِ لَنَا بَصَائِرْ Fī l-dhāhibīna l-awwalīna mina l-qurūni lanā baṣāʾir	Kāmil (5 lines); meditation on mortality, frequently appended to the ʿUkāẓ sermon	al-Jāḥiẓ, al-Bayān wa-l-tabyīn; al-Buḥturī, al-Ḥamāsah; Ibn Dāwūd al-Iṣfahānī, Kitāb al-Zahrah; al-Iṣfahānī, Kitāb al-Aghānī; al-Bayhaqī, Dalāʾil al-nubuwwah; al-Mufīd, al-Ikhtiṣāṣ (final 2 lines); al-Baghdādī, Khizānat al-adab
خَلِيلَيَّ هُبَّا طَالَمَا قَدْ رَقَدْتُمَا Khalīlayya hubbā ṭālamā qad raqadtumā	Ṭawīl (7 lines); elegy for two deceased companions buried at Samʿān	al-Bayhaqī, Dalāʾil al-nubuwwah; Ibn Kathīr, al-Bidāyah wa-l-nihāyah
يَا نَاعِيَ المَوْتِ وَالمَلْحُودِ فِي جَدَثٍ Yā nāʿiya l-mawti wa-l-malḥūdi fī jadathin	Basīṭ (3–4 lines); poem on bodily resurrection, described as found on a written testament (ṣaḥīfah) beneath Quss's head at his death	al-Bayhaqī, Dalāʾil al-nubuwwah; Ibn Kathīr, al-Bidāyah wa-l-nihāyah
يَا أَيُّهَا الهَاتِفُ فِي دَاجِي الظُّلَمْ Yā ayyuhā l-hātifu fī dājī l-ẓulam	Rajaz; response to a nocturnal disembodied voice (hātif) announcing Muhammad's mission; paired in later narratives with the monotheistic hymn Al-ḥamdu li-llāhi lladhī lam yakhluqi l-khalqa ʿabath	al-Bayhaqī, Dalāʾil al-nubuwwah; Ibn Kathīr, al-Bidāyah wa-l-nihāyah
هَاجَ لِلقَلْبِ مِنْ هَوَاهُ ادِّكَارُ Hāja li-l-qalbi min hawāhu iddikāru	Khafīf (8 lines); reflection on time and the alternation of night and day	al-Baghdādī, Khizānat al-adab (shāhid 92)
هَلِ الغَيْثُ مُعْطِي الأَمْنِ عِنْدَ نُزُولِهِ Hal il-ghaythu muʿṭī l-amni ʿinda nuzūlihi	Ṭawīl (2 lines); longevity couplet cited alongside a verse of Labīd	al-Shaykh al-Ṣadūq, Kamāl al-dīn wa-tamām al-niʿmah
تَخَلَّفَ المِقْدَارَ مِنْهُمْ عُصْبَةٌ Takhallafa l-miqdāra minhum ʿuṣbatun	Shiʿi prophetic poem foretelling the Battle of the Camel, Ṣiffīn, and the killing of al-Ḥusayn	Ibn Shahrāshūb, Manāqib Āl Abī Ṭālib; quoted in al-Majlisī, Biḥār al-anwār

=== Medieval monographs and compilations ===
Reports and lexical glosses concerning Quss were also gathered into standalone medieval treatises. The grammarian Ibn Durustawayh (d. 347/958) authored Khabar Quss ibn Sāʿidah al-Iyādī wa-tafsīruhu, a philological commentary on the rare vocabulary (gharīb) of the ʿUkāẓ cycle surviving in a Chester Beatty Library manuscript, and the Baghdad traditionist al-Ḥasan ibn Muḥammad al-Khallāl (d. 439/1047) compiled Khabar Quss ibn Sāʿidah al-Iyādī in ḥadīth-collection format. Later biographical syntheses especially the al-Bidāyah wa-l-nihāyah of Ibn Kathir and the al-Iṣābah of Ibn Hajar collated the disparate chains of transmission and debated whether Quss could be classified among the Companions of the Prophet (ṣaḥābah), noting the consensus of earlier authorities that Quss had passed away before the beginning of the prophetic mission of Muhammad.

== Sources ==
- al-Rabīʿī, Aḥmad (1974). Quss ibn Sāʿidah al-Iyādī: ḥayātuhu, khuṭabuhu, shiʿruhu قس بن ساعدة الإيادي: حياته، خطبه، شعره (in Arabic). Najaf: Maṭbaʿat al-Nuʿmān.
- Awad, Najib George (2023). "'Supposedly Encountered an Arian Monk': John of Damascus on the Origin of Islam". In Ables, Scott (ed.). John of Damascus: More than a Compiler. Brill. pp. 116–132. doi:10.1163/9789004526860_008. ISBN 978-90-04-52686-0.
- Dadoo, Yousef (2016). "Linguistic and cultural affinities : the case of Arabic and Ethiopian languages". Journal for Semitics. 25 (2): 700–725. doi:10.25159/1013-8471/2553.
- Dziekan, Marek M. (2012). "Quss Ibn Sa'ida al-Iyadi (6th–7th Cent. A.D.), Bishop of Najran An Arabic and Islamic Cultural Hero Authors". Studia Ceranea. 2: 127–135. doi:10.18778/2084-140X.02.11. hdl:11089/4269.
- Dziekan, Marek M. (1995). "Quss Ibn Saʿida in Shīʿīte-Imamite Theological Literature". Rocznik Orientalistyczny. 50 (2): 87–94. hdl:11089/32430.
- Hoyland, Robert (2007). "Epigraphy and the Linguistic Background to the Qurʾān". In Reynolds, Gabriel Said (ed.). The Qurʾān in its Historical Context. Routledge. pp. 51–69.
- Pellat, Charles (1986). "Kuss b. Sāʿida al-Iyādī". Encyclopedia of Islam, 2nd ed., Volume 5 (PDF). Brill. pp. 528–529.
- Qutbuddin, Tahera (2019). Arabic Oration: Art and Function. Leiden: Brill. ISBN 978-90-04-39580-0.
- Qutbuddin, Tahera (2008). "Khutba: The Evolution of Early Arabic Oration". In Gruendler, Beatrice; Cooperson, Michael (eds.). Classical Arabic Humanities in Their Own Terms: Festschrift for Wolfhart Heinrichs. Brill. pp. 176–273.
- Saʿīd, Muḥammad (2012). "Quss ibn Sāʿidah al-Iyādī" قُسّ بن ساعدة الإيادي. Bulletin d'études orientales (in Arabic). 60: 67–112. doi:10.4000/beo.555.
- Sells, Michael A. (2016). "The Casting: A Close Hearing of Sūra 20:1–79". In Neuwirth, Angelika; Sells, Michael A. (eds.). Qurʾānic Studies Today. Taylor & Francis. pp. 124–177.
- Shahid, Irfan (2007). "Islam And Oriens Christianus: Makka 610-622 AD". In Grypeou, Emmanouela; Swanson, Mark (eds.). The Encounter of Eastern Christianity with Early Islam. Brill. pp. 9–32. ISBN 978-90-474-0882-6.
- Nicholson, Reynold A. (2013). A Literary History of the Arabs. Taylor & Francis. ISBN 978-1-136-17009-6.
