= Al-Okhdood =

Archaeological site in Najran, Saudi Arabia

- الأخدود
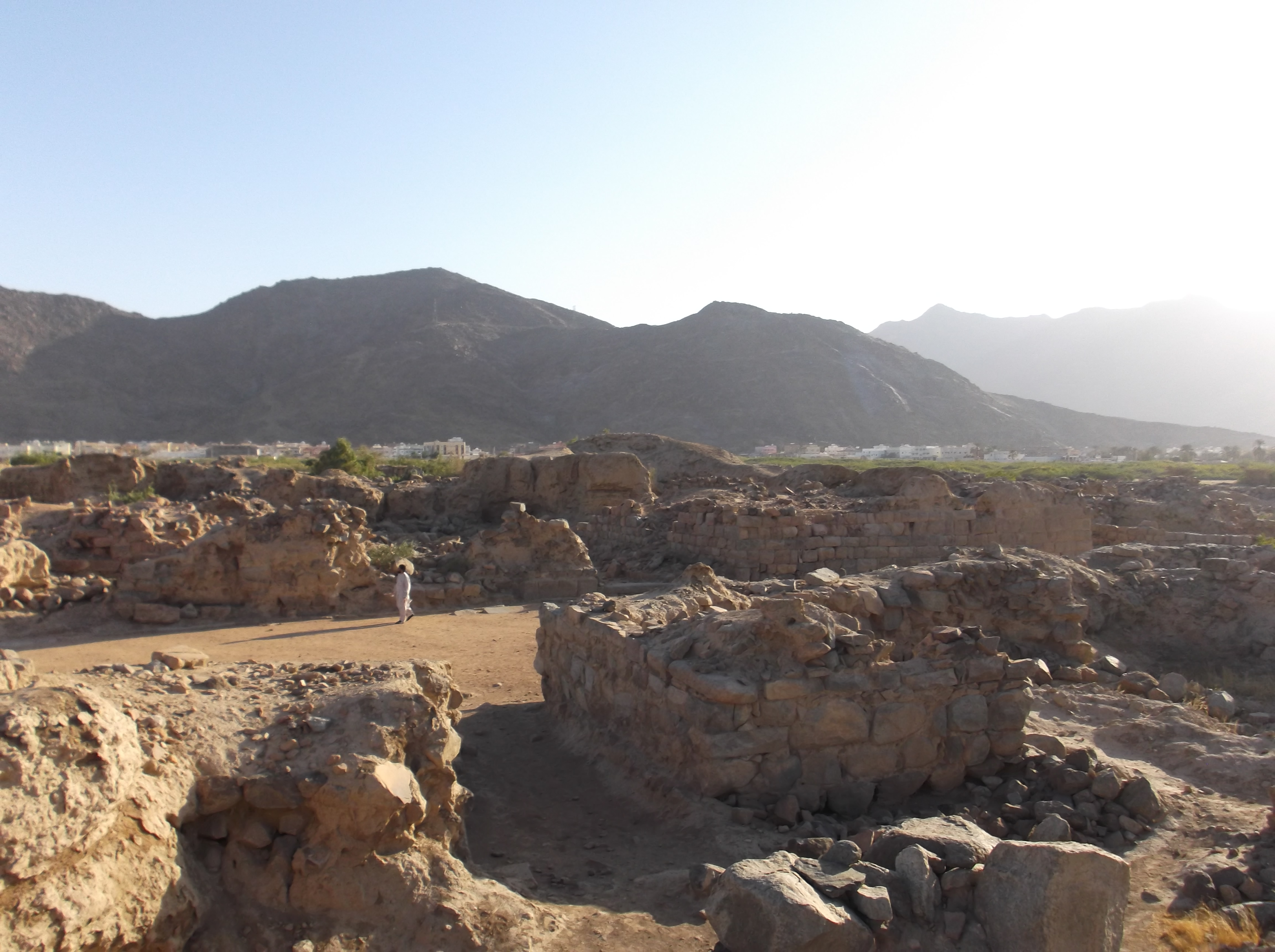
- The ruins of al-Okhdood

- Location within Saudi Arabia

General information
- Status: Free access to the public
- Location: AlUkhdud Archaeological Site, Najran Province, Saudi Arabia
- Coordinates: 17.4773446°N 44.1793054°E
- Completed: c. 500 BCE

Al-Okhdood (Arabic: الأخدود) or Al-Okhdood Archaeological Site, is an ancient South Arabian town located in Najran Province in Saudi Arabia, southeast of the present-day city of Najran. Currently in ruins, the town dates back to at least 500 BCE and was formerly a hub for trading and commercial purposes. It is also famous for being the location where the Himyarite king Dhu Nuwas massacred the majority of the population of the city which had converted to Christianity from South Arabian polytheism.

== Etymology ==
The name Al-Okhdood, also spelled as al-Ukhdud, means trench, ditch or pit in Arabic. This name was given in reference to the story of the People of the Ditch in the Quran, which likely refers to the inhabitants of Najran who were massacred by being thrown alive into burning trenches.

== Location ==
Al-Okhdood is located in Najran Province, near the region of Bir Hima, and is about 1300 kilometres south of Riyadh.

== History ==
=== Ancient history ===
During ancient times, Al-Okhdood was a large centre for trading and other commercial activities. The entire town generally dates back to at least 500 BCE. The largest of these structures is a fort, which dates back to the 1st century BCE and is built out of bricks made from stone and mud.

=== Late Antiquitiy ===
During the time period of Late Antiquitiy, the inhabitants of Najran adhered to South Arabian polytheism and venerated a large tree which they had deified. It was during this time that a Christian preacher, Phemion, had entered Najran and begun to spread his religion, something which the people accepted. Other sources report his apprentice Abdullah ibn Thamir as being the one to actually solidify the Christian religion in Najran. Either way, the town was home to the Christian community of Najran in Late Antiquitiy.

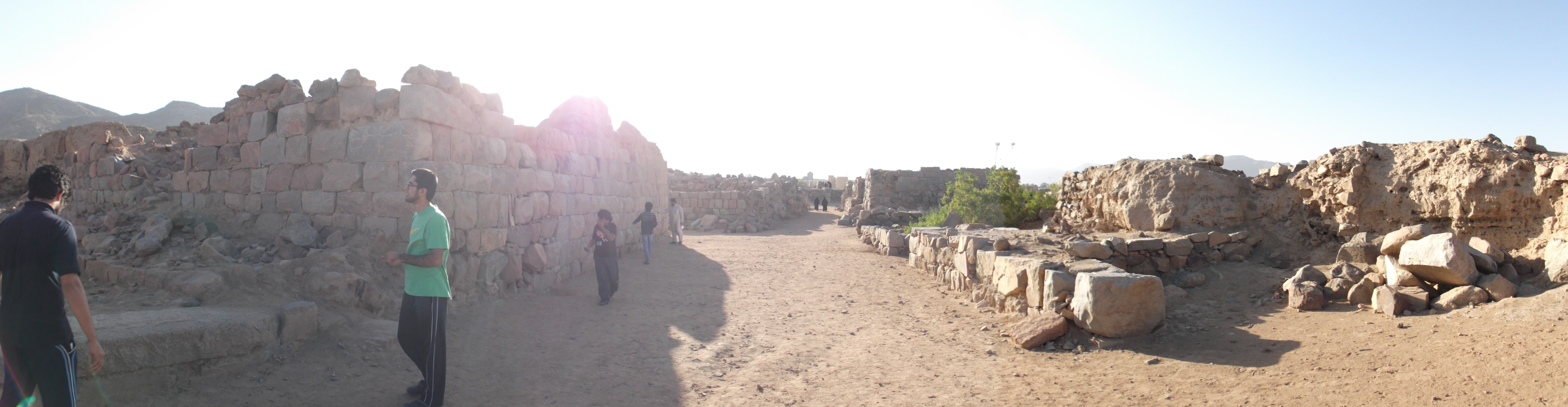
Panoramic view of the al Okhdood archeological site

According to the Martyrdom of Azqir, in the 470s, the Himyarite king Sharhabil Yakkuf ordered the execution of a Christian priest named Azqir, who had erected a chapel or church in the ancient town. Two governors, Dhu Tha'laban and Dhu Qaifan, were also sent to destroy this religious structure. These actions done by King Sharhabil were likely not religiously motivated and were probably just to prevent the Byzantine influence from spreading, as Christianity was most likely seen as something affiliated with Byzantium. Almost a century later, in the 520s, the last Himyarite king Dhu Nuwas invaded Najran after the city had refused to pledge allegiance to him, although other sources including the Tarikh al-Tabari report that it was because Dhu Nuwas, who had a hatred for Christianity, had found out that the inhabitants of Najran were now Christians. All of the people of Najran who had refused to accept Judaism or leave Christianity were brutally massacred, and their churches and chapels burnt to the ground.

The incident of the persecutions was alluded to in the Qur'an, which states in the chapter al-Burooj regarding the People of the Ditch:

Condemned are the makers of the ditch, the fire ˹pit˺, filled with fuel, when they sat around it, watching what they had ˹ordered to be˺ done to the believers, who they resented for no reason other than belief in Allah—the Almighty, the Praiseworthy–˹the One˺ to Whom belongs the kingdom of the heavens and earth. And Allah is a Witness over all things. (Translated by Mustafa Khattab)

After 530 CE, Dhu Nuwas had been defeated by the Kingdom of Aksum, and Christianity returned to flourish in Najran.

=== Islamic period ===
During the early Islamic period, a mosque was built at Najran; it is the oldest mosque throughout Najran Province. In the 620s, the people of Najran migrated to another location, which is now the present city of Najran. Artifacts from the Umayyad and Abbasid periods have also been discovered in the ancient town.

=== Modern history ===
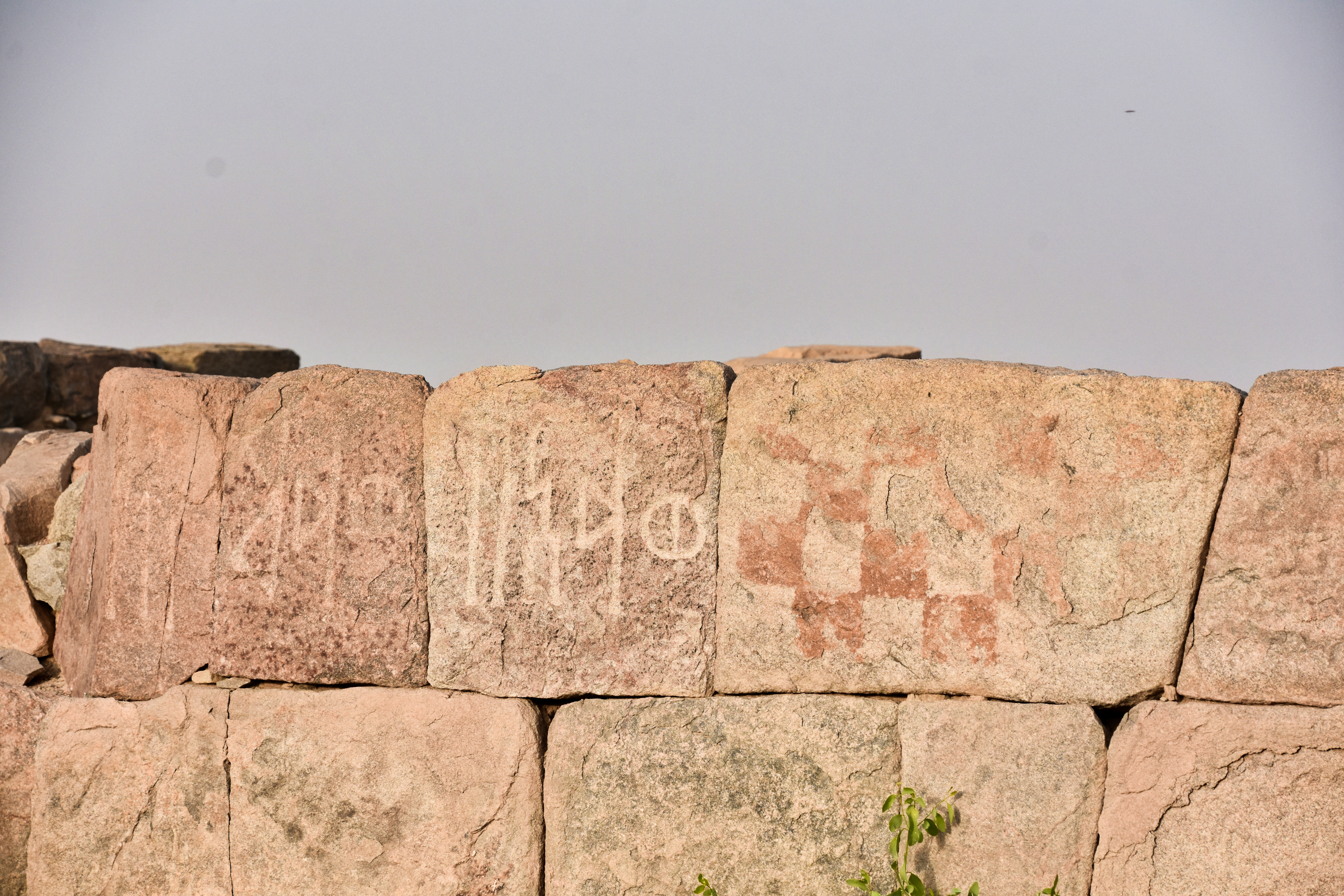
Inscriptions visible on the Kaaba of Najran

Since 1979, the Ministry of Culture has been conducting archaeological excavations at the site. Excavations in 1997 also revealed several ancient tombs, as well as graves which dated to the Islamic period. In 2016, the French National Centre for Scientific Research collaborated with the Saudi government to conduct more excavations and research, with fruitful discoveries. In 2023, a new initiative was announced to make the site more tourist-friendly and informative about the site's history.

== See also ==
- Ancient towns in Saudi Arabia
- Cities of the ancient Near East
