= Simeon of Beth Arsham =

Bishop of Beth-Arsam in the early 6th century

Simeon of Beth Arsham (Syriac: ܫܡܥܘܢ ܕܒܝܬ ܐܪܫܡ, romanized: Shemʿun di-Beth Arsham) was the Syrian bishop of Beth Arsham in the 6th century, near Seleucia-Ctesiphon. He was known as the "Persian Debater", and played a prominent role in the development of a distinct Miaphysite Church following the 451 Council of Chalcedon. Most biographical information about Simeon is based on the hagiographical Lives of Eastern Saints by John of Ephesus (d. 589).

Simeon's most famous surviving work is his Letter on the Himyarite Martyrs, recounting the massacre of the Christian community of Najran by the South Arabian king Dhu Nuwas. He also wrote a letter on the heresies of the Nestorians. Both have been translated into English. Less widely accepted attributions of authorship include a second letter on the Najran massacre and of a work known as the Book of the Himyarites.

== Life ==
Simeon was known as an eloquent and passionate disputant, and devoted to his Orthodox faith. He used to argue with Nestorians, Manicheans, Eutychians and the doctrines of Marcion of Sinope and Bardaisan in which he earned the title 'The Persian Disputant'. He spent most of his life in Mesopotamia and Persia preaching Christianity, where many pagan Arabs, dignitaries of Persian Zoroastrianism and Magians were baptized by him. Three baptized Magi were denounced by the king Kavadh I and their former colleagues, they were found dead ten days after their baptism. According to John of Ephesus, Simeon was threatened with death and had to grow his hair and beard to go unnoticed.

An alliance broke out between the Nestorian Church and the Persian monarchy, the Nestorians presented themselves as the national Christian church and denounced their opponents as a "fifth column" of the Byzantine Empire. Simeon then made his first journey to Constantinople, and obtained a letter from the emperor Anastasius to be delivered to the king of the Persians, where he begged him not to take sides in the quarrels between the Christians of his state.

At a time when Simeon was staying in al-Hira, the Catholicos Nestorian Babai wrote to five monophysite bishops inviting them to a conference. The latter sent for Simeon, the celebrated debater, and the Nestorians were in great distress when they saw him arriving with the bishops. This symposium, which occupies an important place in the text of John of Ephesus, apparently held in Arzun near Siirt in the Province of Nisibis (Arbayistan), at least in the presence of the Marzban, the provincial governor of the Persian frontier, who was to serve as an arbiter. According to the Monophysite writer, the debate ended, of course, with Simeon's undisputed triumph, which was "on this occasion" (thus under the pontificate of Babai) promoted to be the Bishop of Beth Arsham to the dissident church located on the Tigris near Seleucia-Ctesiphon shortly before 503.

Simeon nevertheless pursued his itinerant preaching in the Persian kingdom. But some time later, at the urging of the Nestorian hierarchy by John of Ephesus, King Kavadh first ordered the arrest of all the bishops and archimandrites Monophysites and was imprisoned in Nisibis for seven years. After his release, he continued traveling in which he visited Constantinople. Later on, the emperor Anastasius chose him to be a delegate to the Persian King Kavadh, to discuss easing the restrictions on Christians.

In 526 a war between Byzantine Empire and the Sassanid Empire began, and the king of the Lakhmids "Al-Mundhir III ibn al-Nu'man" attacked Syria. Two high-ranking Byzantine commanders were captured, Timostratus and John. This caused Justinian I to send al-Mundhir an embassy to Al-Hira for peace consisting of Abraham son of Euphrasius (his son is Nonnosus the historian) and Simeon of Beth Arsham.

Simeon's last journey was to meet the empress Theodora in Constantinople, where he died around 540.

== Letters ==
Simeon authored a letter concerning the heresy of the Nestorians, and the Catholicos Babai. It only survives in one manuscript: ms. Vatican Library, Syr. 135, fols. 24r–27r. The letter opens:

In the days of Babai the Catholicos, this Mari emerged (as) the teacher of the heresies of the followers of Paul of Samosata and Diodorus [of Tarsus] in Beth Aramaye. And Babai the Catholicos, the son of Hormizd who was the secretary of Zabercan the Marzban of Beth Aramaye, received the doctrine from him. Anyone who does not confess that Mary is Theotokos, let him be anathema!

— Syriac Manuscripts from the Vatican Library. Fol.27a

Then, he traveled to Najran to interview eyewitnesses, (Note: Some sources indicate that he only questioned the survivors without travelling to the massacre scene.) and write a report about the massacre of Christians perpetrated by the Jewish Himyarite "Dhu Nuwas" on 25 November 523. He described what happened in a letter to another Simeon, the bishop of Gabula:

The Jews amassed all the martyr’s bones and brought them into the church where they heaped them up. They then brought in the priests, deacons, sub-deacons, readers, and sons and daughters of the covenant…they filled the church from wall to wall, some 2,000 persons according to the men who came from Najran; then they piled wood all round the outside of the church and set light to it, thus burning the church with everyone inside it.

— The letter is given by J. S. Assemani

There is some evidence for the reliability of Simeon's letter on the massacre from its extensive familiarity with the situation, topography, and onomastics of South Arabia.

== Bibliography ==
- Syriac Manuscripts from the Vatican Library; Volume 1, VatSyr 135, number 6: A letter by Bishop Simeon of Beth Arsham concerning Barsauma and the heresies of the Nestorians. Fol. 25b.
- The letter is given by Assemani, B.O. vol. i. p. 359 seq. A letter of Jacob of Serugh, and a hymn by Johannes Psaltes, translated into Syriac by Paul of Edessa, have been published by Schroeter in Z.D.M.G. 31, p. 363 ff. See also Procopius, De bello Persico, i. 20.

== Sources ==
- Butts, Aaron Michael (2022). "Simeon of Beth Arsham, Letter on Bar Ṣawmā and the Heresy of the Nestorians". The Cambridge Edition of Early Christian Writings: Volume 4: Christ, Chalcedon, and Beyond. Cambridge University Press. pp. 309–316.
- Nebes, Norbert (2010). "The Martyrs of Najrān and the End of Ḥimyar: On the Political History of South Arabia in the Early Sixth Century". In Neuwirth, Angelika; Sinai, Nicolai; Marx, Michael (eds.). The Qur'an in Context. Historical and Literary Investigations into the Qur'anic Milieu. Brill. pp. 25–60.
- Saint-Laurent, Jeanne-Nicole Mellon (2015). Missionary Stories and the Formation of the Syriac Churches. University of California Press.
- Walters, J. Edward (2021). "Simeon of Beth Arsham, Letter on the Ḥimyarite Martyrs". Eastern Christianity: A Reader. Grand Rapids, MI: Eerdmans. ISBN 978-0-8028-7686-7.
