= Najran Valley Dam =

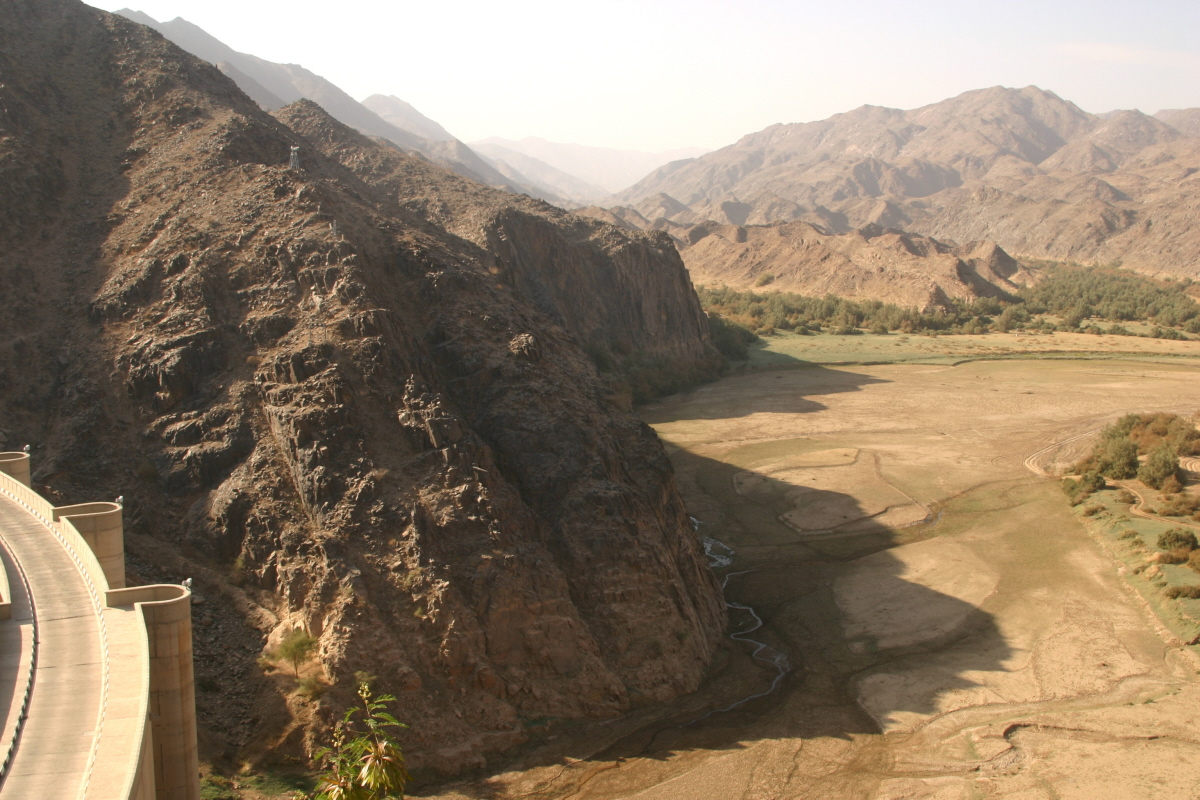
- Empty reservoir behind the dam, located in the Najran Mountains

- Location in Saudi Arabia Najran Valley Dam (Middle East) Najran Valley Dam (Asia)
- Official name: سدّ وَادِي نَجْرَان
- Country: Saudi Arabia
- Location: Wadi Najran, Najran Province
- Coordinates: 17°24′29.12″N 44°00′50.41″E
- Purpose: Water supply, flood control, groundwater recharge
- Status: Operational
- Opening date: 1981; 45 years ago
- Owners: Ministry of Water and Electricity

Dam and spillways
- Type of dam: Arch
- Impounds: Wadi Najran
- Height: 73 m (240 ft)
- Length: 140 m (460 ft)
- Spillway capacity: 8,200 m^{3}/s (290,000 cu ft/s)

Reservoir
- Creates: Najran Reservoir
- Total capacity: 86,000,000 m^{3} (70,000 acre⋅ft)

The Najran Valley Dam (Arabic: سدّ وَادِي نَجْرَان, romanized: Sadd Wādī Najrān / Sudd Wādī Najrān) is an arch dam on Wadi Najran about 15 km (9.3 mi) southwest of Najran, in the Najran Province of southwest Saudi Arabia. Its purposes include water supply, flood control and groundwater recharge. Its collects run-off and sediment in the wadi and helps release it downstream slowly throughout the year. The dam was completed in 1981, and inaugurated by the Crown Prince of Saudi Arabia Nayef bin Abdulaziz Al Saud in 1982. It is owned by the Ministry of Water and Electricity.

== See also ==
- List of dams in Saudi Arabia
