= Phemion =

Credited founder of Najran Christian community

Phemion (Arabic: فيميون, romanized: Faymiyun) is an individual who is credited with the foundation of the Christian community of Najran. He is described as being a nomad with an ascetic lifestyle who a devoted follower of Christianity.

== Biography ==
Phemion was a man who hailed from the Levant and worked in the Arabian Peninsula as a master bricklayer. He would go out to the desert and pray until evening whenever it was a Sunday. He also had a companion named Saleh, whom was deeply close and devoted to him. Phemion had the ability to perform working miracles and would leave a village to another one after he had converted a village to Christianity, with Salih following close behind him.

== Involvement in Najran ==
Phemion is credited as being one of the first to introduce Christianity in the town of Najran. It is narrated by Wahb ibn Munabbih that Phemion was able to convince the locals to reject South Arabian polytheism and accept Christianity, after a miracle happened where a gust of wind destroyed the palm tree that the inhabitants had deified and worshipped. An alternative tale describes Phemion as being a mentor for his disciple Abdullah ibn Thamir, who, this time, is credited as the one to solidify Christianity into Najran.

== See also ==
- Abdullah ibn Thamir
- People of the Ditch
- Christian community of Najran

== Sources ==
- Ibn Hisham (1 January 2020). As-Seerah an-Nabawiyyah Volume 1 [The Life Of The Prophet]. Dar Sadr. ISBN 978-9953130729.
- Tabari; ?abar? (1999-11-04). The History of Al-Tabari: The Sasanids, the Lakhmids, and Yemen. SUNY Press. ISBN 9780791443569.
