= Saj' =

Form of rhymed prose in Arabic literature

Saj' (Arabic: سجع, romanized: sajʿ) is a form of rhymed prose defined by its relationship to and use of end-rhyme, meter, and parallelism. There are two types of parallelism in saj': iʿtidāl (rhythmical parallelism, meaning "balance") and muwāzana (qualitative metrical parallelism).

Saj' was the earliest artistic speech in Arabic. It could be found in pre-Islamic Arabia among the kuhhān (the pre-Islamic soothsayers) and in Abyssinia for ecclesiastical poetry and folk songs. One famous composer of saj' was said to have been the bishop of Najran, Quss Ibn Sa'ida al-Iyadi.

Saj' continued in Islamic-era Arabic literature and speech. The stylistic similarities between saj' and the Quran have long been a matter of discussion especially between saj' and the style of the earliest surahs. In Umayyad times, saj' was discredited as an artistic style for resembling the speech of soothsayers. This, however, did not stop people from composing saj'. Saj' in the style of pre-Islamic Arabia was still being written in Abbasid times, and was being invoked in the same situations, like in speeches before battle, the cursing of one's killers before their own death, derision, and argument. Saj' was attributed to Muhammad's companions, like Abu Bakr, and prominent figures in early Islamic history, like Ibn al-Zubayr and Al-Hajjaj. After the image of saj' had been rehabilitated, in large part thanks to the effort of Al-Jahiz, it became a major form of Arabic literary prose and was used in genres like the maqāma. To this day, saj' continues to be used by peasants and bedouin. Saj' appears in many famous works, including the One Thousand and One Nights. It also became popular in Persian literature, like in the Golestān of Saadi. Saj' was used by Quran exegetes and in texts that attempt to imitate the style of the Quran.

== Definition and terminology ==
According to Devin J. Stewart:

In its simplest form, sajʿ consists of groups of consecutive cola sharing a common rhyme and meter.

Stewart has also offered a more elaborate definition.

Sajʿ, though generally considered a sub-category of prose (nathr), is a type of composition distinct from both free prose (nathr mursal) and syllabic verse (naẓm). It consists of rhyming phrases termed sajaʿāt (sing sajʿah). The rules governing the rhyme in sajʿ are slightly different from those governing the rhyme in the qaṣīdah, the most noticeable difference being that the rhyme-words in sajʿ generally end in sukūn. Sajʿ conforms to an accentual meter: each sajʿah tends to have the same number of word-accents as its partner sajʿahs. Therefore, the fundamental unit of sajʿ prosody is the word, lafẓah (pl. Iafaẓāt), and not the syllable or the tafʿīlah.

Angelika Neuwirth has defined saj' as:

short units rhyming in frequently changing sound patterns reiterating the last consonant and based on a common rhythm

A single clause in saj' is called a sajʿah (pl. sajʿāt), or a faṣl (fuṣūl), or a fiqrah (pl. fiqar), or a qarīnah (pl. qarāʾin).

== Description ==
In English, saj' is commonly just translated as "rhymed prose", but as a form of writing, involved additional rules (rarely explicated by Arab critics) beyond being that prose which rhymes. Traditionally, saj' has been defined as prose (nathr, manthūr) divided into phrases or clauses, each of which end in a common rhyme. The basis of saj' prosody is formed by the word rather than the syllable. As such, a mistaken or misunderstood way to describe saj' would be to try to describe it by a typical number of syllables per clause, as opposed to a typical number of words per clause. Saj' has an accentual meter, meaning that its meter is defined by the number of stressed syllables per line. The length of one clause or phrase (sajʿah) is equal or nearly equal in length to its partner clause, a property that has been called "balance" (iʿtidāl), and the number of words in a clause closely corresponds to its number of syntagmatic stresses (beats). Al-Bāqillānī defends the principle of balance in saj' against his interlocutors in the following manner:

One part of what they call sajʿ has segment endings close to each other and segment cuts near each other. The other part is stretched so that its segments can be twice as long as the preceding ones and a segment can return to the original measure (wazn) only after plenty of words. Such sajʿ is not good and does not deserve to be praised. Someone might say: "When the balanced sajʿ has been stated, it ceases to be sajʿ at all. The speaker is not obliged to make all his speech sajʿ. He can say something in sajʿ, then turn away from it, and then return to it once more." Our reply is: "When one of the hemistichs of a bayt is different from the other, it leads to disorder and imbalance. And it is exactly the same, when one of the hemistichs (miṣrāʿ) of a sajʿ utterance becomes disorganized and dissimilar to the other, as it also leads to imbalance." We have shown that the Arabs blame any sajʿ which deviates from the balance of parts (ajzāʾ) so that some of its hemistichs are made of two words, and others of many words; they consider this weakness not eloquence.

Another common feature of saj' writing, also found in the Quran, is the presence of an introductory formula to the rest of the text that does not itself follow the ordinary structure of saj'. The sajʿāt proper begin after the introductory phrase. In terms of length, Ibn al-Athir distinguished between short saj', where each clause has between two and ten words, with long saj', where each clause has eleven or more words, without any set limit. Ibn al-Athir produces an example containing nineteen words per clause (Quran 8:43–44). Zakariya al-Qazwini says that there are short, middle, and long forms of saj', but without specifying their boundaries, although unlike Ibn al-Athir, he does propose a limit to the number of words in long saj' (nineteen). For Al-Qalqashandi, since the Quran represented the height of literary elegance, he recommended against composing saj' any longer than nineteen words, which is the longest example of saj' found in the Quran. Medieval critics also typically preferred shorter versions of saj'.

== Examples ==
Many cases of saj' have been attributed to early, pre-Islamic figures, including Ta'abbata Sharran, Quss Ibn Sa'ida al-Iyadi, ʿAwf ibn Rabīʿah, Musaylima, and others.

Robert Hoyland identifies three similar cases:

Salma al-‘Udhri
aḥifu bin-nûri wa-l-qamri

was-sana wad-dahri
war-riyâḥi wa-l-faṭri
la-qad khaba’tum lî juththata nasri
fi ‘ikmin min sha‘ri
ma‘a l-fatâ min banî Nasri

I swear by the light and the moon

by the lightning flash and by fate
by the winds and the cleaving
You have hidden for me a vulture’s corpse
in a bundle of hair
in the possession of the youth from the Banu Nasr

ʿUsfan
ḥalaftu bi-azbin ‘ufri

bi-lamma‘ati qafri
yarudna bayna silmin wa-sidri
inna sana’ al-majdi thumma l-fakhri
la-fî ‘A’idh ilâ âkhiri d-dahri

I swear by dust-coloured gazelles

in mirage-glinting deserts
roaming among thorn-trees and lote-trees
The highest degree of glory and honour
is ever to be found in ‘A’idh

Quran 91:1–10
wash-shamsi wa-ḍuḥâ-hâ

wa-l-qamari idhâ talâ-hâ
wan-nahâri idhâ jallâ-hâ
wal-layli idhâ yaghshâ-hâ
was-samâ’i wa-mâ banâ-hâ
wa-l-arḍi wa-mâ ṭaḥâ-hâ
wa-nafsin wa-mâ sawwâ-hâ
fa-alhama-hâ fujûra-hâ wa-taqwâ-hâ
qad aflaḥa man zakkâ-hâ
wa-qad khâba man dassâ-hâ)

By the sun and its midday brightness

By the moon which rises after it
By the day which reveals its splendour
By the night which veils it
By the heaven and Him that built it
By the earth and Him that spread it
By a soul and Him that moulded it
And gave it knowledge of sin and piety
Blessed shall be the man who has kept it pure
And ruined he that has corrupted it

Another famous example is a piece attributed to Quss Ibn Sa'ida al-Iyadi:

O People! Listen and retain! He who lives dies. He who dies is lost [forever]. Everything that could happen will happen. A dark night…a bright day…a sky that has zodiacal sign…stars that shine…seas [whose waters] roar…mountains firmly anchored...an earth spread out…rivers made to flow. Indeed, there are signs in the sky. There are lessons in the earth. What is the state of the people—going and never returning? Have they been satisfied, thus choosing to reside [there]? Or were they abandoned, [are they] sleeping? Quss swears an oath by God in which there is no sin: God has a religion that is more satisfactory to Him and better than the religion in which you believe. Indeed, you do evil deeds. In those that went before in eons past, are instances for us to take heed. When I looked at the watering holes of death, from which there is no returning—[When] I saw my people towards them going, young and old—The one who passed not coming back to me and not from those who remain, he who goes. I became convinced that I—without a doubt—will go where the people have gone.

== Saj' in the Quran ==
The question of whether the Quran includes saj' has been a contentious issue among Arabic literary critics because of the worry that this would conflate the Quran with human composition. Most believed the Quran contained a significant amount of saj' or that it has several formal features of saj' but that it should not be described as such out of respect. Some theologians thought that some entire surahs were saj', including Surah 53 ("The Star"), Surah 54 ("The Moon"), and Surah 55 ("The Merciful"). In Arabic manuals describing saj', the vast majority of listed examples are from the Quran.

While much of the Quran fits the criteria of saj', not all of it does. Saj' is mostly in Meccan surahs (as opposed to Medinan surahs), especially in earlier Meccan surahs. Saj' has short verses, with each verse being one line (monopartite verses). This is true of Meccan surahs, but in Medinan surahs, verses are usually two lines (bipartite). Another difference with Meccan surahs is that Medinan surahs have unbalanced lines, where one of the two lines in a pair have greatly differing lengths. Therefore, although 86% of the Quran has end-rhyme (series of lines where the final word rhymes), but a smaller proportion of it will be saj' as it will rhythmical parallelism. Likewise, some lines with rhythmical parallelism do not have end-rhyme.

Ibn al-Athir defines four types of Quranic saj': equal saj' when both lines of a saj' unit are equal, unbalanced saj' when the second part of the saj' unit is longer than the first, short saj', and explicitly long saj'. Devin J. Stewart has classified five main structural patterns of saj' units in the Quran. A more recent preliminary analysis, attempting to identify all categories of Quranic saj', has identified fifteen.

=== Perspectives in Islamic tradition ===
For Ibn Sinān al-Khafājī, the mode of Arabic in the Quran was consistent with existing custom and usage. On the other hand, those concerned with the doctrine of Quranic inimitability believed that saying saj' could be found in the Quran would muddy the distinction between the speech of God and that of humans. For example, Al-Baqillani (d. 1013 AD) in a work of his entitled Iʿjaz al-Qurʾān ("The Inimitability of the Quran"), went to great lengths to dispute that any of the Quran could be described as saj'. For some, the Quran was not saj' per se, although it was similar to saj'. Others argued that one should withhold from referring to the Quran as saj' merely out of respect for the Quran. Some proponents of the presence of saj' in the Quran solved this problem by creating a distinction between divine and human saj'. For example, Abu Hilal al-Askari argued:

Qur'anic discourse which assumes the form of sajʿ and izdiwāj is contrary to human discourse which assumes this form in its ability to convey the meaning, its clarity of expression, its sweetness and musicality.

In effect, al-Askari argued that unlike human saj', the Quran applies saj' and achieves the greatest possible elegance and meaning, even as it took on the literary limitations and formal constraints of saj'. For Ibn al-Athir, most of the Quran was saj', and it was only the need to be concise that prevented all of it from being composed in saj'.

== Saj' in other religions ==
Qewle Diroze, one of the hymns of Yazidism, which enumerated and praised holy men, sacred places, and objects and rituals of the Yezidi tradition. It was often recited at Lalish on feast days, specifically during the observance of Berê Shibakê. The hymn read: "amîn amîn amîn, himeta Şemsedîn, Fexredîn, Sicadîn, Nasirdîn, Şêmise quweta dîn, Qedî Bilban qedîm, Siltan Şîxadî tanc ji ewilîn û axirîn, heq hemdullah ya rebil alemîn, ya Şîxadî elêkil selam", meaning "Amen, amen, amen, by the greatness of Shemsedin, Fekhredin, Sejadin and Nasirdin. Sheikh Shems is the strength of the religion. Qadib al-Ban is ancient. Sultan Sheikh Adi has the first and last crown. Truth, praise be to God, lord of both worlds. Oh Sheikh Adi, peace be upon you."

== Controversy over saj' ==
Prophetic hadith were commonly invoked over debates about the legitimacy of the use of saj'. The most famous example is the "hadith of the fetus". The context is that Muhammad is settling a dispute between two factions. One participant of the dispute suddenly begins using saj' as a rhetorical technique, and Muhammad condemns him for doing so. While some cite this as evidence that Muhammad prohibited saj', others have argued that Muhammad's prohibition was limited to the use of saj' in bolstering an illegitimate point. A number of other Prophetic hadith also figured in debates about if saj' could be used in prayer. Some cited examples of Muhammad's prohibition of saj' in prayer, while others cited examples of Muhammad using saj' during prayer.

== See also ==
- Pre-Islamic Arabic poetry
- Rhymed prose
