= Wadi Najran =

Valley in the Arabian Peninsula

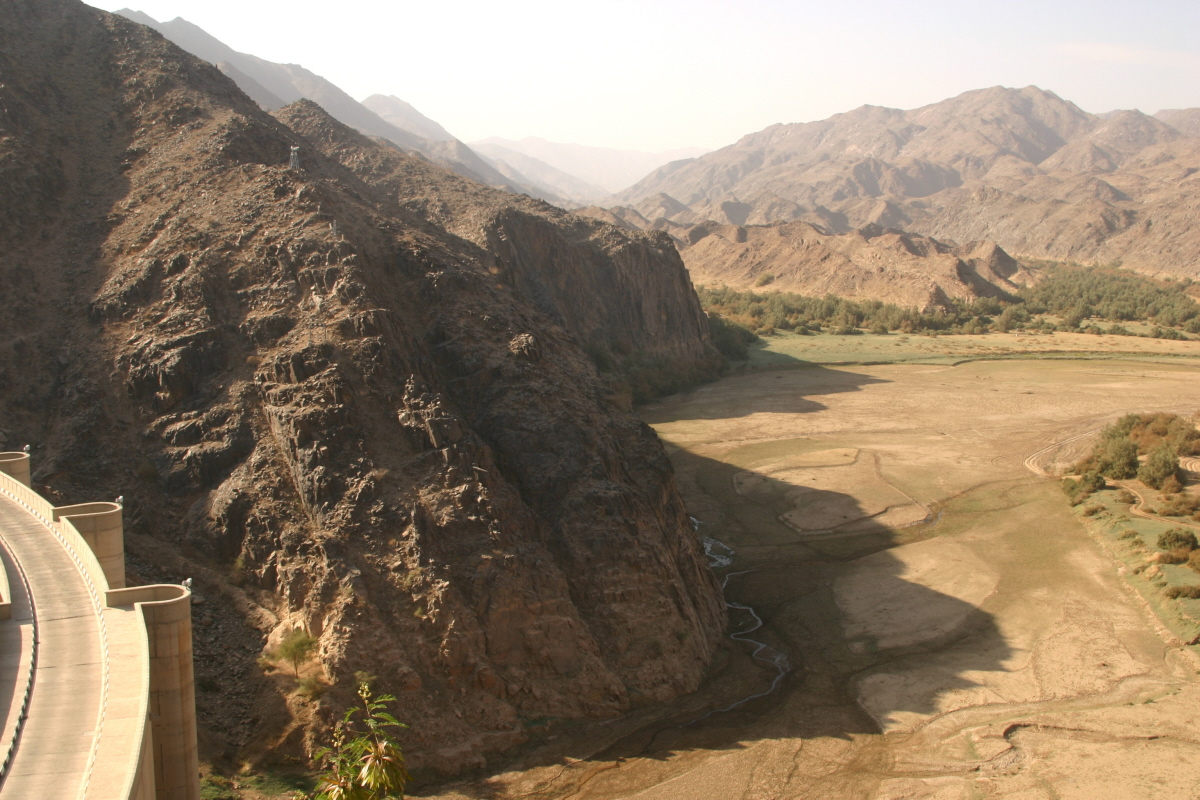
Empty reservoir behind the Najran Valley Dam, located in the Najran Mountains

Wadi Najran (Arabic: وَادِي نَجْرَان, romanized: Wādī Najrān) is one of the largest valleys in the Arabian Peninsula, and its tributaries come from the Sarat mountains and hills surrounding the area. It extends 180 miles (290 kilometres) to the east from its mouth in the plains where it ends in the sands of the Empty Quarter. The average size in the plains is 1,000 metres (3,300 feet).

The river divides the city of Najran into two parts, causing extensive damage when it floods. It is the main source of water supply for the region and brings large amounts of silt deposited in the plains and flooded farms along its banks. The Najran Valley Dam is located on its course.

Wadi Najran (Saudi Arabia)
