= Najran =

City in Najran Province, Saudi Arabia

Najran نجران
- City
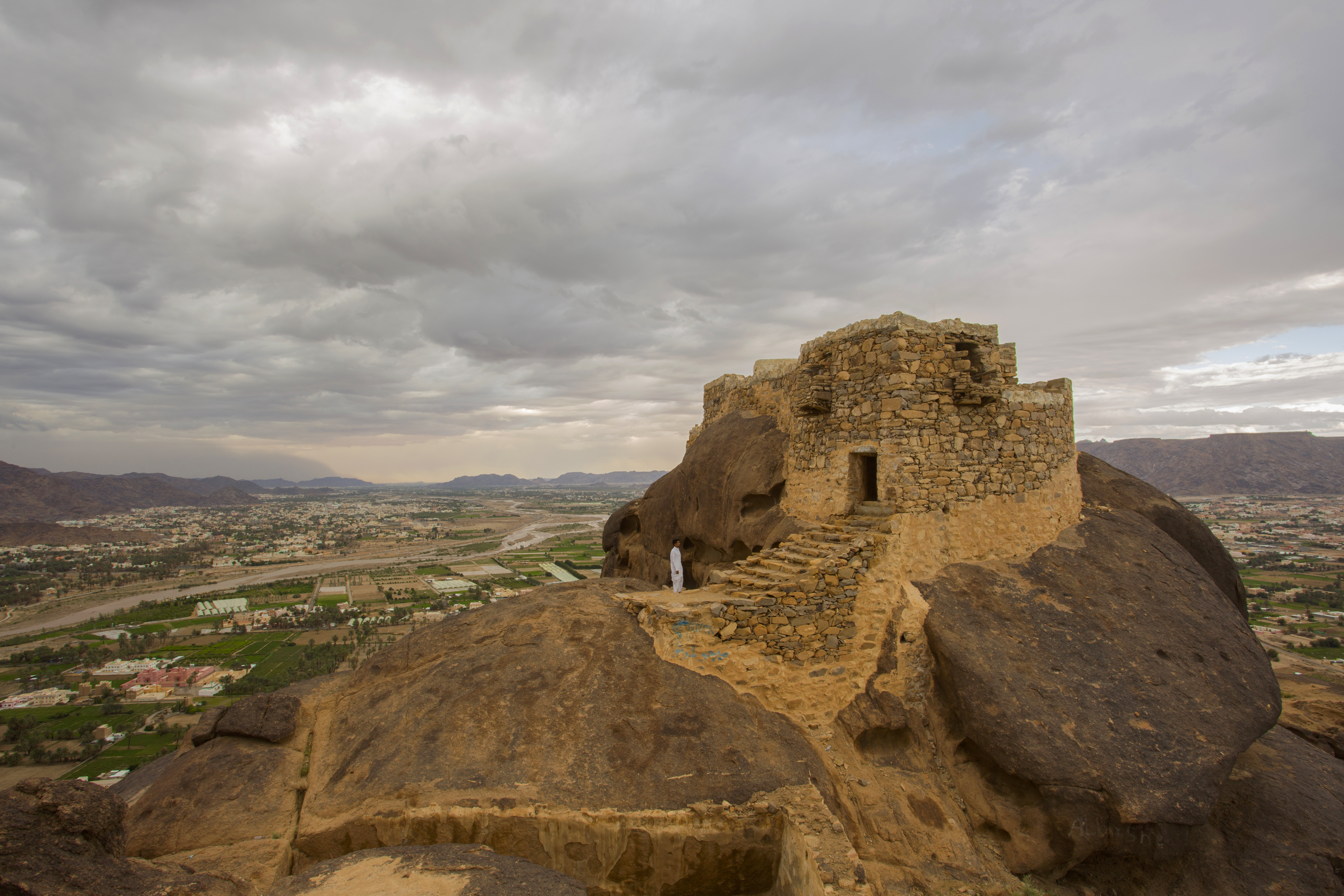
- Raum Castle

- Location within Saudi Arabia
- Coordinates: 17°29′30″N 44°7′56″E
- Country: Saudi Arabia
- Province: Najran Province
- Region: South Arabia
- Established: 2000 BC

Government
  - Mayor: Faris al-Shafaq
  - Provincial Governor: Jiluwi bin Abdulaziz
- Elevation: 1,293 m (4,242 ft)

Population (2022 census)
  - Total: 381,431
- Time zone: UTC+3
  - Summer (DST): UTC+3
- Area code: (+966) 17
- Website: www.najran.gov.sa

Najran (Arabic: نجران Najrān; IPA: [nad͡ʒ.raːn]), is a city in southwestern Saudi Arabia. It is the capital of Najran Province. Today, the city of Najran is one of the fastest-growing cities in the kingdom of Saudi Arabia. As of the 2022 census, the city population was 381,431, with the population of the governorate of Najran being 592,300. Today, the population is primarily Ismaili with a Sunni minority.

The ancient city of Najran is now largely in ruins, the archaeological site Al-Okhdood, located south-east of the present-day city. In ancient times, this Najran was a major urban, agricultural, industrial (cloth, leather), and trade (incense) center, located in the midst of a fertile wadi (valley), called the Wadi Najran. Najran was also located at the intersection of two main caravan routes: one running from Hadhramaut, to the Hejaz, to the Eastern Mediterranean, and another running from the northeast through Al-Yamama and into Mesopotamia. Its pre-Islamic history is notable for its Christian community, including its central role in South Arabian Christianity and the massacre of this community by the king Dhu Nuwas.

== Name ==
According to the Martyrdom of Arethas, Najran derives from a Hebrew term meaning both "thundering city" or "invincible lock". According to Christian J. Robin, this source is well-informed but not exact: in ancient times, the oasis was called both Najran and Rgmt, with the latter deriving from the Hebrew Raʿma, meaning "thundering city", while the Arabic najrān means "invincible lock". The "lock" etymology is based on Najran's place in travel and trade on the peninsula, as Najran acts as the "lock" that gives access to Yemen. The Hebrew name for the site is used in the Old Testament (Genesis 10:7, 1 Chronicles 1:9, Ezekiel 27:22), where it is associated with the South Arabian kingdom of Sheba.

The name Najran is used in local Sabaic inscriptions, as well as Greek, Latin, Nabataean, and Ge'ez sources. Minaean and Jawf inscriptions prefer Ragmatum (Rgmtm), which appears to derive from the name of an old royal residence. In the second-third centuries, the main settlement of the oasis briefly came to be called either Najran or Ẓirbān, before the name returned to just Najran by the sixth century. Najran, however, always remained the name of the oasis as a whole.

== Geography ==
The Najran oasis stands 4,500 feet above sea-level. Its tallest point is 2,000 feet high in the oasis, or 6,500 feet above sea-level. The length and width of the oasis is 15 and 2 miles, respectively. The oasis has a layer of sandstone lying above igneous rocks (basalt and granite). This sandstone belt stretches over a considerable area across the oasis and has historically facilitated the movement of peoples through Najran (compared with the surrounding granite mountains), enabling both trade and invasion. Many trade routes cross through this area, where many graffiti have been found. In the middle of an arid environment, it hosts rich soil and abundant water resources, and it is an obligatory passageway to reach Yemen when entering from the Hejaz or the Arabian Gulf.

== History ==
=== Early history ===
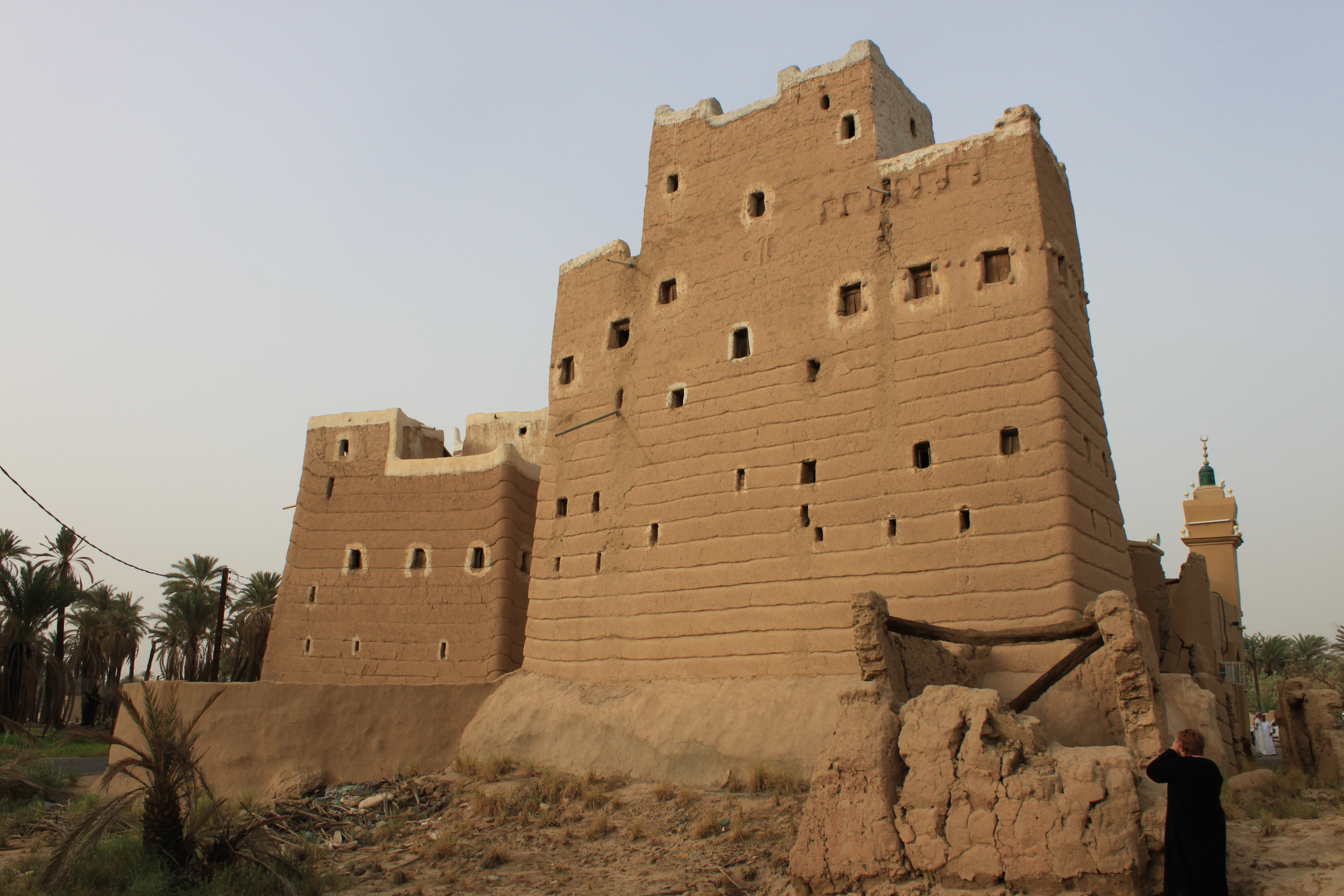
Traditional house in Najran

In the early 1st millennium BC, Najran was controlled by a commune called Muhamirum, which in alliance with other communes, especially Amirum, formed a federation. The great Sabaean mukarrib Karib'il Watar conquered this federation in the early 7th century BC as part of a series of conquests that he described in a lengthy Sabaic inscription that commemorated the achievements of his reign. The federation survived under the tutelage Sabaean domination, and an inscription from the late 7th century BC describes its failed attempt to break away from the kingdom. The major role already played by Najran in trade in this time is reflected by a passage mentioning it in the biblical Book of Ezekiel (27:20–23):

Dedan [today al-Ula in the Hijaz] traded in saddlecloths with you. Arabia and all the princes of Qedar [today al-Jawf in the north of Arabia] were your favoured dealers in lambs, rams and goats. In these they did business with you. The merchants of Sheba [Saba’ in Yemen] and Ra‘mah [Najran] traded with you; for your wares they exchanged the finest of all kinds of spices and precious stones, and gold. Haran, Kanne and Eden traded with you, and merchants of Assur and Media traded with you.

In this time, the inhabitants of Najran likely spoke some variant of North Arabic, while the inscriptions are in the Sabaic script (and more rarely, in Minaic). Three centuries later, another inscription shows continuing Sabaean rule over Najran. As the dominance of Sheba in the region waned, Najran entered into an alliance of small, trade-focused kingdoms under the leadership of the Kingdom of Ma'in. By the 2nd century BC, Amirum eclipsed Ma'in in the Jawf area and took control of Najran. During this period of time, the considerable role played by Najran in the caravan trade led to the great god, Dhu Samawi, being adopted across Yemen, including by the earlier Ma'in kingdom. The only other gods affiliated with Najran in this time are Athtar and the "Master of Mkntn". In later periods, some longer deity lists enumerate all the gods of Najran.

In 24 BC, the Roman Empire briefly conquered Najran during the siege of South Arabia led by the Roman prefect Aelius Gallus. According to the geographer Strabo, Aelius "came to the town of Negranes [Najran], a peaceful, fertile region. The king fled and the town was taken by assault" (Geography 16.4.24). Najran was then used as a launching point to put Marib, the Sabaean capital, under siege. However, the Romans had to retreat from the area shortly afterwards. In the second century, Ptolemy described Najran as a "metropolis" (Geography 6.7.37).

In the second and third centuries AD, rule over Najran switched multiple times. A briefly revitalized Sabaean kingdom retook it, before it passed into the hands of the Himyarite Kingdom during its conquest of Saba. In the first decades of the third century, the Ethiopian Kingdom of Aksum was able to conquer and hold on to it, as described both by Sabaean and Ethiopian sources. By the mid-third century, Himyar regained control over the area. Later in the fourth century, the Namara inscription records that the Lakhmid king Imru al-Qays I waged a campaign against Najran, which it describes as the "city of Shammar" (or Shammar Yahri'sh, the Himyarite king). The campaign by Imru al-Qays may have been waged on behalf of the Roman emperor, Constantine, and it has been suggested that a triggering factor for the conflict involved Shammar's expansion into the territory called Arabia Deserta.

Najran had a local prince/king who held the title ʿāqib as far back as the 2nd century AD. The person holding this office had a civilian purpose, being the administrator of the city and the one maintaining public order, but apparently did not play a military role. This title was also used for the local ruler of other settlements in South Arabia. One named chief, Arethas of Najran (also known as Ḥārith ibn Kaʿb), was one of the victims of the famous massacre of the Christians of Najran. The prestige of the role he played in the city, tied with his martyrdom, led to his clan renaming itself by his name, and their ascendancy in Najranite politics. However, this family lost its power soon after the Islamic conquests.

=== Christian period ===
Christianity may have been introduced into Najran in the fifth century, and from there, it became Christianity's central city in South Arabia and through it Christianity was introduced into the rest of South Arabia. The entrance of Christianity into the city plausibly happened via trade routes. Several late sources suggest different beginnings for the Christianity of Najran. According to the Chronicle of Seert, Christianity was introduced into the area around 450 when a Christian merchant from the city named Hannan travelled to Constantinople, and then Al-Hira, where he converted and was baptised. Upon returning to Najran, he began sharing his faith with others and other members of the community also began to convert. Ibn Ishaq offers a different story: a Christian Syrian named Fimiyyun ended up as a slave in Najran. His manner of praying shocked the Najran community, leading to a mass conversion. Other versions of the story also permeated the Arab-Islamic tradition, some focusing on the miracles of a man named Abdallah ibn Tahmir that Fimiyyun was ministering to, and another centered on a secret conversion of a Himyarite king. Though the details about Christianity's introduction into the area cannot be recovered, an involvement of the trade routes of Al-Hira are possible. Several explicitly Christian inscriptions are known from the Hima Paleo-Arabic inscriptions, located at a site near Najran, with the texts dates covering the late fourth to early fifth centuries. Many of these contain Christian iconography, including large and ornate crosses, establishing a notable Christian community in the region which had produced them. For example, Ḥimà-al-Musammāt PalAr 5 contains a cross and describes a figure named "῾Abd al-Masīḥ" ("the servant of Christ").

The Christian community of Najran experienced waves of persecution before the massacre of the Jewish king Dhu Nuwas, likely beginning around 470. The Martyrdom of Azqir reports that Najran's first priest, Azqir, was transferred to the Himyarite capital Zafar where he was beheaded on the advice of a group of rabbis to create an example against introducing a new religion into the region. The first bishop of Najran, named Paul, was stoned to death sometime afterwards but before 500. Ethiopian sources describe a persecution of Najran's Christians during the reign of the Himyarite king Sharhabil Yakkuf (468–480 AD). Later, the Syriac poet Jacob of Serugh wrote a letter of consolation to the Christian community of Najran (his Letter to the Himyarites), sometime before his death in 521, indicating another wave of persecution prior to the massacre of 523. Finally, the Book of the Himyarites says that an (unidentified) bishop named Thomas appealed to the aid of the Kingdom of Aksum in the face of the Himyarite persecution of the Najran Christians.

Beginning in 522, the Jewish king of Hummer, Dhū Nuwās, initiated a series of campaigns against Christians in South Arabia, including Himyarite locals and Aksumites in the region. The massacre is also recounted in a celebratory manner in an inscription (Ja 1028) commissioned by one of the army commanders of Dhu Nuwas. According to his inscriptions, Dhu Nuwas himself captured and burned down the churches of the cities of Zafar and Al-Mukāʾ. Then, three inscriptions (Ja 1028, Ry 507, and Ry 508) describe the campaigns of Sharahil Yaqbul dhu-Yazan against Najran (despatched by Dhu Nuwas) and the ensuing massacre. According to these inscriptions, Sharahil "positioned himself against Najran" (laying it to siege). He blocked the Najran's caravan route to the northeast that would have led to both Qaryat al-Faw and eastern Arabia to put economic pressure on the city. After a thirteen month long siege, Sharahil captured Najran, which resulted in a large plunder of the area and a stated execution of 12,500 people from the city. Part of the success of the capture involved, according to Simeon's letters, an offer made by Dhu Nuwas that relinquishing control of the area would result in guarantees for the safety of the Christians, which Dhu Nuwas was said to have sworn an oath over, on a Torah scroll, and in the presence of several rabbis. However, Dhu Nuwas broke his promise, and the massacre ensued. The massacre became a moment of international outrage among Christians, with Syriac authors writing many works about the massacre of the Christian community of Najran, including the Book of Himyarites and Simeon's Letter on the Himyarite Martyrs. There is also the Greek Martyrdom of Arethas. A particular moment of outrage, according to Simeon's letters, was how Dhu Nuwas ordered the bones of Najran's bishops to be exhumed, collected in a church, and then burned up there alongside other Christian laity and clerics.

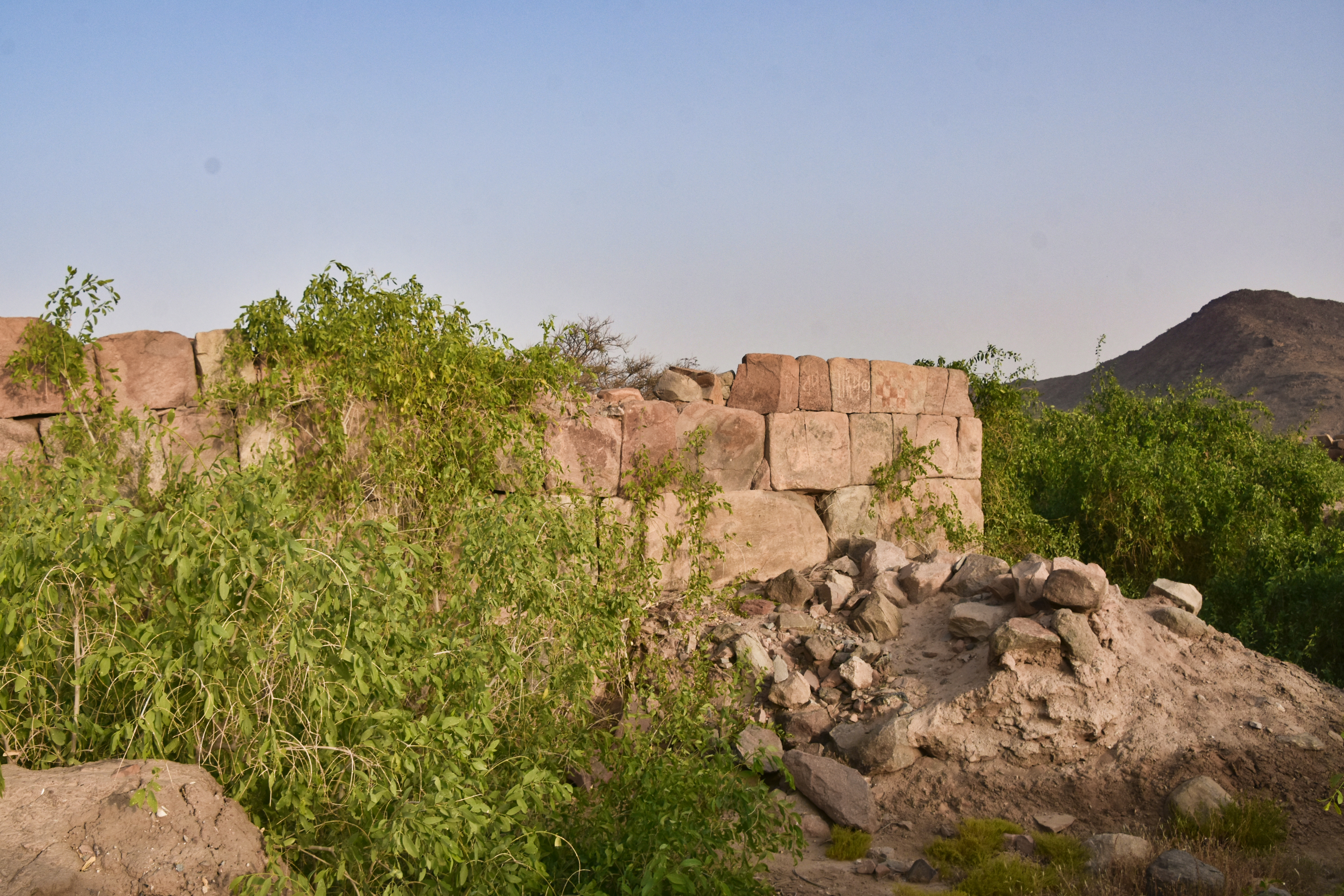
Ruins of the Kaaba of Najran near the ruins of Al-Okhdood

At Najran, Christians built churches, monasteries, and martyria. In the aftermath of the massacre, the clan of Arethas of Najran of the Christian community built a martyrium dedicated to the martyred Christians known as the Kaaba of Najran, one of several pre-Islamic Arabian Kaabas. This Kaaba became a point of pilgrimage, and its custodians were from Banū ʿAbd al-Madān, the chief clan of the tribe of Balḥārith. As such, Najran became one of the holy cities of Eastern Christianity. The Kaaba may be identical to another building named the Martyry of Arethas in sources, constructed around 520 in the memory of the martyrdom of Arethas. In addition to the Kaaba Najran, three churches from Najran are known: the Church of the Ascension of Christ, the Church of the Holy Martyrs and the Glorious Arethas, and the Church of the Holy Mother of God. Monasticism (involving monks and monasteries) is also documented.

Najran was the only episcopal see in the Arabian Peninsula apart from those in Eastern Arabia. The first bishops of Najran are mentioned by the letter written in 524 of Simeon, the bishop of Beth Arsham. According to Simeon, Philoxenus of Mabbug consecrated two bishops, both called Mar Pawlos (Paul). Both died during the massacre, the first during the siege of Zafar, and the second in Najran before its final surrender to Dhu Nuwas. The consecration being done by Philoxenus, a leading member of the Syrian Orthodox Church, indicates a Miaphysite, non-Chalcedonian Christianity at Najran. Other bishops are mentioned in Islamic sources, including the legendary Quss Ibn Sa'ida al-Iyadi, a contemporary of Muhammad. Bishops are attested for Najran into the Islamic era, up until the 9th and 10th centuries.

The Christian community of Najran was also linked with Syriac Christianity and some of the clerics located at Najran were trained in Syriac monasteries. This link is also indicated by a letter sent to the Christians of the city by the Syriac poet and bishop, Jacob of Serugh.

Two strands of the Islamic tradition commented on Christian community of Najran: those sources commenting on the Quranic story of the People of the Ditch, believed by many to be about the massacre of Najran's Christians, and South Arabian Muslims with an antiquarian interest in the regions pre-Islamic history.

=== Islamic period ===
During Muhammad's preaching, he was visited by a delegation of the Christians of Najran that involved a prince (ʿāqib), a sayyid, and a bishop. After the early Muslim conquests, the Christians of Najran fell under Islamic rule. According to the Siyar of ash-Shaybani, the Christians of Najran made an agreement to pay Muhammad an annual tribute of 2,000 pieces of clothing, in return for which they were promised protection. The agreement was renewed under the caliphs Abū Bakr and Umar ibn al-Khattab. In 641, however, the Christians of Najran were accused of usury and expelled from the city. Under the reign of the Caliph ‘Umar, the Christian community of Najran was deported to Mesopotamia, where they settled near Kufa in a place they called Najānīya. In the following period, Najran lost its importance. According to the report of Ibn al-Mujavir, however, Jews and Christians still made up two thirds of the population of Najran in the 13th century.

=== Historical gap from the 7th to 17th centuries ===
The city of Najran disappears entirely from the historical record for about a millennium, between the seventh and the seventeenth century. The sole exception to this is a 110-year period that stretches from the end of the ninth century to the beginning of the eleventh century, well-documented due to the Description of the Arabian Peninsula by Al-Hamdani and biographical accounts of the first Zaydi Yemeni imams who tried to conquer Najran. Najran re-enters the historical record in the seventeenth century, when the Principality of Najran is established by Ismaili Shia Muslims in the 1630s, whose rule continues until the 1930s. The Shi'ism in region influenced since the Zayd bin Ali.

=== Ismaili Shia rule ===
In 1633, the Principality of Najran was established, a state that was initially under the suzerainty of a Yemeni kingdom, although control over it later moved to the Ottoman Empire as part of the formation of Ottoman Arabia.

=== Incorporation into Saudi Arabia ===
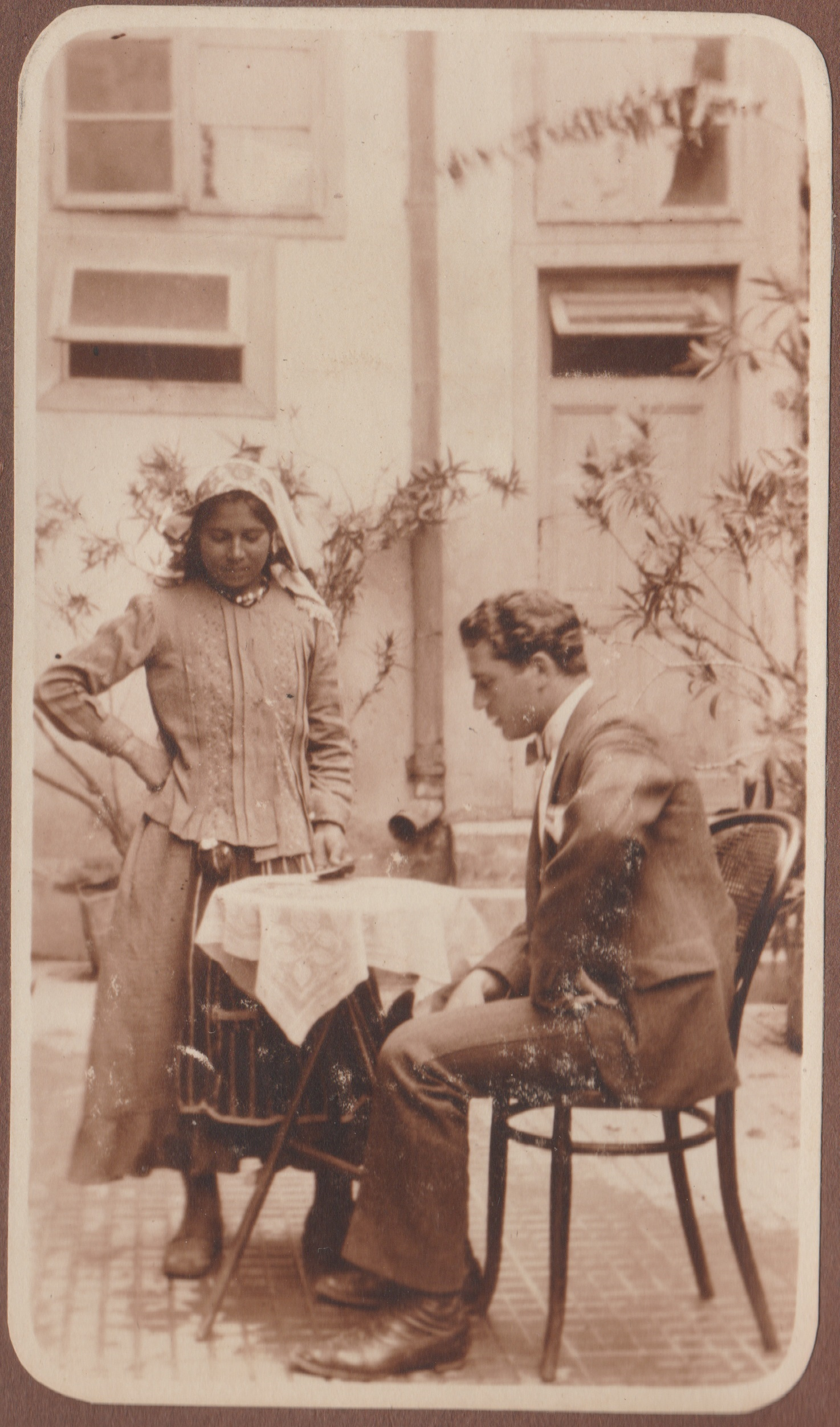
Rabbi Salomon Halevi (last Rabbi of Madras Synagogue) and his wife Rebecca Cohen (Najran Jew), Paradesi Jews of Madras

After the Ottoman Empire was defeated during World War I, they retreated from the Arabian Peninsula and left behind the region including Najran as part of the newly formed Kingdom of Yemen. In 1932, Ibn Saud merged the Kingdom of Hejaz and the Sultanate of Nejd to establish the kingdom of Saudi Arabia. Between the formation of these two new states was a territory not properly demarcated, leading to a land dispute over which kingdom Najran belonged to. After failed negotiations over the issue in February 1934, Saudi Arabia launched the Saudi–Yemen war on March 20. Saudi Arabia's forces quickly drove out the Yemeni forces. Concerned over their territorial possessions in the neighbouring colonial Africa, Britain, Italy, and France sent warships into the port city of Hodeidah, which had also been captured by Saudi Arabia, leading to Ibn Saud announcing a ceasefire and the initiation of negotiations. The war officially ended on May 20 with the signing of the Treaty of Taif, which defined the border from the Red Sea to the southern tip of Najran. While Saudi only claimed temporary rule over the Najran province at the time, in 1994, it asserted permanent ownership.

After taking Najran in 1934, the local Jewish population was recorded by Saudi Arabia at around 200 at the time. In 1949, they were permitted to leave to the Yemenite city of Aden, where they rejoined the Yemenite Jewish community that were migrating to Israel.

=== Persecution of the Ismaili community ===
The Ismailis, a religious and ethnic minority with historic roots in Najran Province of southwestern Saudi Arabia, face increasing threats to their identity as a result of official discrimination. Official discrimination in Saudi Arabia against Ismāʻīlīs encompasses government employment, religious practices, and the justice system. Government officials exclude Ismāʻīlīs from decision making and publicly disparage their faith.

With the arrival of Mishʻal bin Suʻūd as the governor of Najran in 1996, tensions between local authorities and the Ismaʻili population increased, culminating in a watershed confrontation between armed Ismaʻili demonstrators and police and army units outside Najran's Holiday Inn hotel on April 23, 2000. Three months earlier, police had closed all Tayyibi Ismaʻili mosques on a religious holiday. On April 23, after security forces and religious morality police arrested an Ismāʻīlī cleric, a large demonstration took place outside the Holiday Inn, where Governor Mishʻal resided. After the governor refused for hours to meet the petitioners, an exchange of fire between security forces and armed demonstrators left two Ismāʻīlīs dead and, according to some government accounts, killed one policeman as well. Believing their religious identity to be under attack, Ismāʻili men erected defences around Khushaywah, the seat of the Ismaʻili religious leader Da'i al-Mutlaq. Khushaywah, which includes the Manṣūrah Mosque complex, was also the spiritual capital of Sulaymani Ismaʻilis, a community with followers in India and Pakistan as well as Saudi Arabia and Yemen. The army surrounded the Ismaʻili positions and placed the city under its control. The standoff ended later the same day without further bloodshed.

== Architecture ==
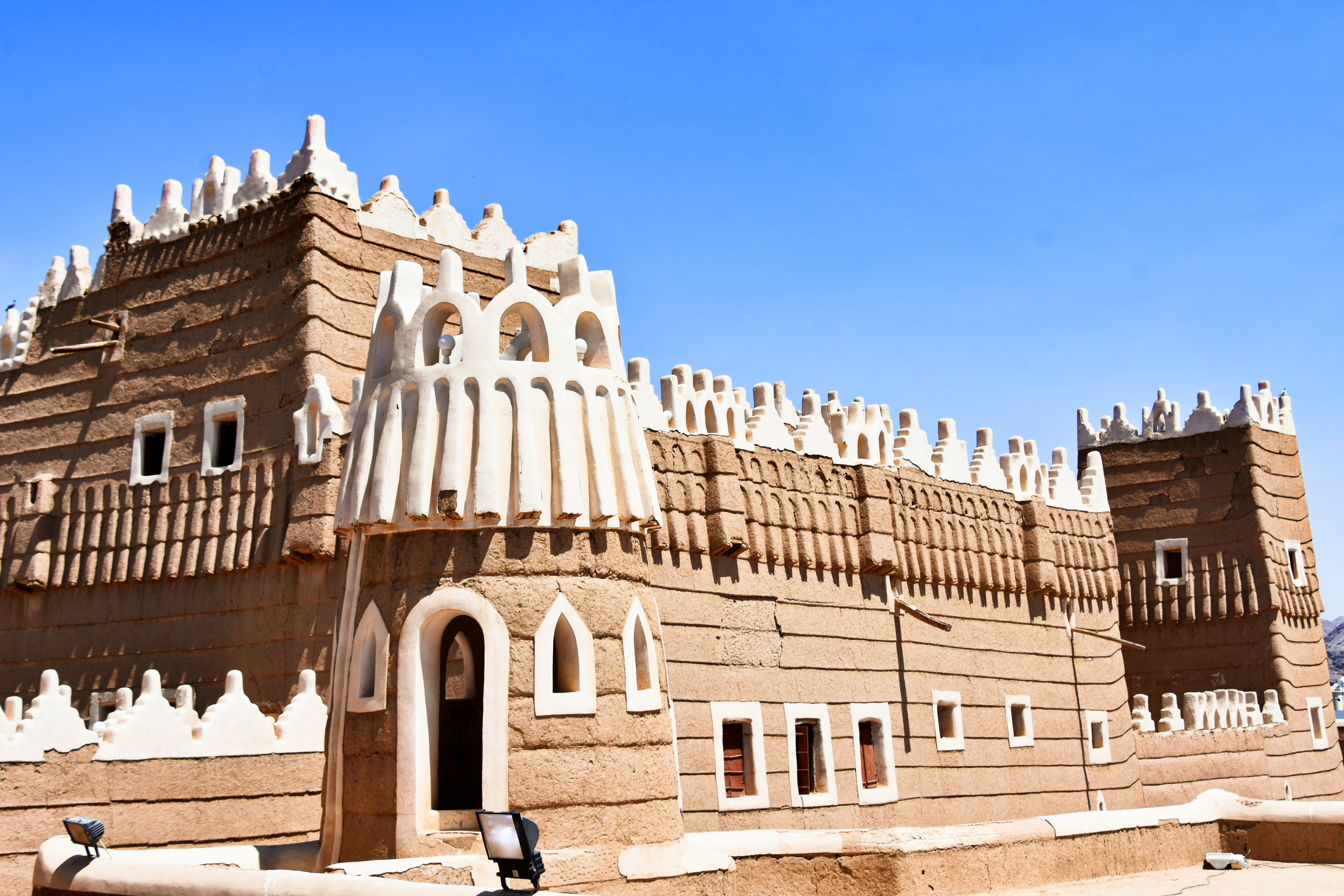
The Najran fort

The fort of Najran was constructed in 1942. In 1967, it was decommissioned. Before this, it was the palace of the local emir. Despite its recent construction, it was built according to earlier architectural norms, with thick mud walls and a high ceiling whose height is supported by palm rafters. Today, it is one of the main tourist attractions of the town.

In 1981, construction for the Najran Valley Dam was completed, in the Wadi Najran about 15 km (9.3 mi) southwest of the main city. Its purposes include water supply, flood control and groundwater recharge.

== Archaeology ==
Najran city is famous for its archeological significance. Old Najran was surrounded by a circular wall, 220 by 230 meters, built of square stone with defensive balconies. It contained several unique buildings. There is also a cemetery south of the external wall. Excavations of this site have uncovered glass, metals, pottery, and bronze artifacts. Square and rectangular buildings have also been found. At Al-Ukhdūd which is south of Najran city, carvings from those days and human bones can be seen. A museum displays, among other items, a bronze lion head. Najran's landmarks include the "Rass" stone, a 2-meter-high granite stone.

== Climate ==
Najran has a hot desert climate (Köppen BWh), typical of the Arabian Peninsula. Rainfall is very sporadic, and consists of light individual rainfall. Despite its location in far southern Saudi Arabia, Najran's average temperature is approximately 3.3 °C or 5.9 °F cooler than that of the Saudi capital Riyadh, due to it being 700 metres or 2,300 feet higher in altitude.

Climate data for Najran Domestic Airport (1991–2020)
| Month | Jan | Feb | Mar | Apr | May | Jun | Jul | Aug | Sep | Oct | Nov | Dec | Year |
|---|---|---|---|---|---|---|---|---|---|---|---|---|---|
| Record high °C (°F) | 36.0 (96.8) | 38.4 (101.1) | 39.4 (102.9) | 40.0 (104.0) | 42.0 (107.6) | 43.0 (109.4) | 44.0 (111.2) | 43.0 (109.4) | 42.0 (107.6) | 38.0 (100.4) | 35.0 (95.0) | 36.0 (96.8) | 44.0 (111.2) |
| Mean daily maximum °C (°F) | 26.2 (79.2) | 29.2 (84.6) | 32.0 (89.6) | 34.6 (94.3) | 37.5 (99.5) | 39.4 (102.9) | 39.8 (103.6) | 39.6 (103.3) | 37.3 (99.1) | 32.6 (90.7) | 28.7 (83.7) | 26.4 (79.5) | 33.6 (92.5) |
| Daily mean °C (°F) | 17.7 (63.9) | 20.7 (69.3) | 24.0 (75.2) | 27.0 (80.6) | 30.0 (86.0) | 31.9 (89.4) | 33.2 (91.8) | 32.6 (90.7) | 29.7 (85.5) | 24.7 (76.5) | 20.9 (69.6) | 18.0 (64.4) | 25.9 (78.6) |
| Mean daily minimum °C (°F) | 9.2 (48.6) | 12.0 (53.6) | 15.8 (60.4) | 19.0 (66.2) | 21.7 (71.1) | 23.1 (73.6) | 25.7 (78.3) | 24.8 (76.6) | 21.0 (69.8) | 15.9 (60.6) | 12.7 (54.9) | 9.7 (49.5) | 17.5 (63.5) |
| Record low °C (°F) | 1.0 (33.8) | 3.0 (37.4) | 4.0 (39.2) | 11.0 (51.8) | 14.5 (58.1) | 16.2 (61.2) | 17.0 (62.6) | 17.0 (62.6) | 15.0 (59.0) | 7.8 (46.0) | 3.5 (38.3) | 1.4 (34.5) | 1.0 (33.8) |
| Average precipitation mm (inches) | 2.9 (0.11) | 0.9 (0.04) | 15.0 (0.59) | 20.1 (0.79) | 10.5 (0.41) | 3.0 (0.12) | 3.7 (0.15) | 10.7 (0.42) | 0.1 (0.00) | 4.7 (0.19) | 1.7 (0.07) | 0.5 (0.02) | 74.1 (2.92) |
| Average precipitation days (≥ 1.0 mm) | 0.5 | 0.3 | 1.4 | 2.9 | 1.2 | 0.2 | 0.8 | 1.2 | 0.1 | 0.5 | 0.3 | 0.1 | 9.5 |
| Average relative humidity (%) | 41 | 38 | 35 | 35 | 22 | 15 | 16 | 18 | 18 | 23 | 31 | 41 | 28 |
| Mean monthly sunshine hours | 275.9 | 223.2 | 241.8 | 234.0 | 341.0 | 300.0 | 269.7 | 248.0 | 297.0 | 325.5 | 315.0 | 306.9 | 3,378 |
| Mean daily sunshine hours | 8.9 | 7.9 | 7.8 | 7.8 | 11.0 | 10.0 | 8.7 | 8.0 | 9.9 | 10.5 | 10.5 | 9.9 | 9.2 |
Source 1: NOAA
Source 2: Deutscher Wetterdienst (humidity 1974–1990, sun 1986-1990)

== Colleges and universities ==
Najran is home to Najran University, the Najran College of Technology, and the Najran Technical College. The Saudi Electronic University has a branch in Najran.

== Hospitals and medical care ==
- King Khalid Hospital
- Najran General Hospital
- Maternity & Children's Hospital Najran
- Najran Armed Forces Hospital
- General Psychiatric Hospital
- Al Zafer Hospital
- Al Hayah Hospital
- Al Qadi Specialty Hospital
- Al Shefa Medical Hospital
- International Medical Complex
- Al Masa dental center

== Sports ==
Notable Sports Clubs and Centers in Najran
| Name | Arabic Name | Founded | Type |
|---|---|---|---|
| Al-Okhdood Club | نادي الأخدود | 1976 | Football Club |
| Sharora Club | نادي شرورة | 1975 | Football Club |
| Najran SC | نادي نجران | 1980 | Football Club |
| Khldiat Al-Janob Sport Center | مركز الخالدية الرياضي | — | Sports Center |
| Prince Mishal Sport Center | مركز الأمير مشعل | — | Sports Center |
| Najran Bowling Alley | — | — | Recreational Facility |

== See also ==
- List of cities and towns in Saudi Arabia
