= Rajaz =

Metre in classical Arabic poetry

A manuscript of an urjūza (versification) of Muqaddimat Ibn Rushd ("The Introduction of Ibn Rushd al-Jadd," grandfather of Ibn Rushd the philosopher)

Rajaz (رَجَز, literally 'tremor, spasm, convulsion as may occur in the behind of a camel when it wants to rise') is a metre used in classical Arabic poetry. A poem composed in this metre is an urjūza. The metre accounts for about 3% of surviving ancient and classical Arabic verse. Some historians believe that rajaz evolved from saj'.

== Form ==
This form has a basic foot pattern of | ⏓ ⏓ ⏑ – | (where '–' represents a long syllable, '⏑' a short syllable, and '⏓' a syllable that can be long or short), as exemplified through the mnemonic (Tafā'īl) Mustafʿilun Mustafʿilun Mustafʿilun (مُسْتَفْعِلُنْ مُسْتَفْعِلُنْ مُسْتَفْعِلُنْ). Rajaz lines also have a catalectic version with the final foot | ⏓ – – |.

The form of each (metron) may be ⏑ – ⏑ –, – – ⏑ –, or – ⏑ ⏑ –; only rarely ⏑ ⏑ ⏑ –.

Lines are most often of three feet (trimeter), but can also be of two feet (dimeter). Thus the possible forms are:

| ⏓ ⏓ ⏑ – | ⏓ ⏓ ⏑ – | ⏓ ⏓ ⏑ – | (trimeter)
| ⏓ ⏓ ⏑ – | ⏓ ⏓ ⏑ – | ⏓ – – | ( trimeter catalectic)
| ⏓ ⏓ ⏑ – | ⏓ ⏓ ⏑ – | (dimeter)
| ⏓ ⏓ ⏑ – | ⏓ – – | (dimeter catalectic)

Uniquely among the classical Arabic metres, rajaz lines do not divide into hemistichs. The early Arab poets rhymed every line on one sound throughout a poem. A popular alternative to rajaz poetry was the muzdawij couplet rhyme, giving the genre called muzdawija.

Although widely held the oldest of the Arabic metres, rajaz was not highly regarded in the pre- and early Islamic periods, being seen as similar to (and at times indistinguishable from) the rhymed prose form saj'. It tended to be used for low-status, everyday genres such as lullabies, or for improvisation, for example improvised incitements to battle.

Rajaz gained in popularity towards the end of the Umayyad period, with poets al-‘Ajjāj (d. c. 91/710), Ru‘ba (d. 145/762) and Abū al-Najm al-‘Ijlī (d. before 125/743) all composing long qaṣīda-style pieces in the metre. Abū Nuwās was also particularly fond of the form.

In the twentieth century, in response to the aesthetics of free verse, rajaz, both in traditional form and more innovative adaptations, gained a new popularity in Arabic poetry, with key exponents in the first half of the century including poets ‘Ali Maḥmūd Ṭāhā, Elias Abu Shabaki, and Badr Shakir al-Sayyab (cf. his 'Unshūdat al-Maṭar'). Since the 1950s free-verse compositions are often based on rajaz feet.

== Example ==
A famous, early example is the following incitement to battle by Hind bint Utbah (6th/7th century CE), showing the form | ⏓ ⏓ ⏑ – | ⏑ – ⏑ – |, with the first two elements mostly long, and the fifth one always short:

نَحْنُ بَنَاتُ طَارِقِ، نَمْشِي عَلَى النَّمَارِقِ، الدُرُّ فِي المَخَانِقِ، وَالمِسْكُ فِي المَفَارِقِ، إنْ تُقْبِلُوا نُعَانِقِ، أوْ تُدْبِرُوا نُفَـارِقِ، فِرَاقَ غَيْرَ وَامِقِ.	naḥnu banātu ṭāriqī namshī ‘alā n-namāriqī wad-durru fī l-makhāniqī wal-misku fī l-mafāriqī ’in tuqbilū nu‘āniqī ’aw tudbirū nufāriqī firāqa ghayra wāmiqī	We are those Ṭāriq girls We walk on carpets fair Our necks are hung with pearls And musk is on our hair If you advance we'll hug you Or if you flee we'll shun you And we'll no longer love you	| – ⏑ ⏑ – | ⏑ – ⏑ – | | – – ⏑ – | ⏑ – ⏑ – | | – – ⏑ – | ⏑ – ⏑ – | | – – ⏑ – | ⏑ – ⏑ – | | – – ⏑ – | ⏑ – ⏑ – | | – – ⏑ – | ⏑ – ⏑ – | | ⏑ – ⏑ – | ⏑ – ⏑ – |

== Relationship to Sarī‘ ==
The rajaz metre is very similar to the sarī‘, of which the first two metra are the same as rajaz, but the third is shortened:

| ⏓ ⏓ ⏑ – | ⏓ ⏓ ⏑ – | ⏓ ⏑ – | (trimeter)
| ⏓ ⏓ ⏑ – | ⏓ ⏓ ⏑ – | – – | ( trimeter catalectic)

Unlike the rajaz, sarī‘ is used in couplets.

The third metron is usually – ⏑ –, ⏑ ⏑ – being very rare, especially at the end of a couplet.

The two metres are considered by some scholars to be variations of the same metre.

== Key studies ==
- Five Raǧaz Collections: (al-Aghlab al-ʻIǧlī, Bashīr ibn an-Nikth, Ǧandal ibn al-Muthannā, Ḥumayd al-Arqaṭ, Ghaylān ibn Ḥurayth), ed. by Jaakko Hämeen-Anttila, Studia Orientalia, 76/Materials for the study of Raǧaz poetry, 2 (Helsinki: Finnish Oriental Society, 1995), ISBN 9519380264
- Minor Raǧaz Collections: (Khiṭām al-Muǧashiʻī, the two Dukayns, al-Qulākh ibn Ḥazn, Abū Muḥammad al-Faqʻasī, Manẓūr ibn Marthad, Himyān ibn Quḥāfa), ed. by Jaakko Hämeen-Anttila, Studia Orientalia, 78/Materials for the study of Raǧaz poetry, 3 (Helsinki: Finnish Oriental Society, 1996), ISBN 9519380280
- Manfred Ullmann, Untersuchungen zue Raǧazpoesie. Ein Beitrag zur arabischen Sprach- und Literaturewissenschaft (Wiesbaden, 1966)
- Frolov, D. (1997). "The Place of Rajaz in the History of Arabic Verse". Journal of Arabic Literature. 28 (3): 242–290. ISSN 0085-2376.

== Sources ==
- Frolov, Dimitry (2000). "Archaic Verse: Sajʾ". Classical Arabic Verse: History and Theory of 'Arūḍ. Brill. pp. 97–134. ISBN 978-90-04-49245-5.
