= Book of the Himyarites =

Intact page from the Book of the Himyarites, with a chapter heading in red

The Book of the Himyarites (Syriac: ܟܬܒܐ ܕܚܡܝܪ̈ܝܐ, Ktābā da-ḥmirāye) is an anonymous Syriac account of the persecution and martyrdom of the Christian community of Najran in the Kingdom of Himyar around 523 AD and the ensuing Aksumite interventions. It was written sometime between the sixth and tenth centuries in a Syriac Orthodox milieu.

== Manuscript ==
The only known manuscript of the Book of the Himyarites is incomplete and partially damaged. It was discovered in 1920 in the protective boards of a codex bound in 1469/1470. The tenth-century codex had been repurposed for the binding of another, and in the process its pages were cut down. While some pages of text are entirely intact, others are fragmentary. The original tenth-century copy of the Book probably contained at least ten quires of twenty pages each. About 59 pages of text are preserved.

The script of the text is similar to that of the Codex Climaci Rescriptus from Edessa. The table of contents of the Book is preserved almost in its entirety. It contained 49 chapters. Each chapter is headed by a red rubric, although the name of the Himyarite king Masruq is never in red and is often deliberately written upside down.

The scribe of the manuscript was named Stephanos, and he worked in the church of Saint Thomas in the city of Qaryathen. He noted that he finished his work on 10 April 932.

== Authorship and date ==
The text is anonymous as it stands, since no part of the surviving manuscript names an author. It was composed in a Syriac Orthodox milieu. Simeon of Beth Arsham, who lived in the first quarter of the sixth century and was thus a contemporary, has been proposed as the author. This proposal has not gained general acceptance, although Simeon is accepted as the author of a letter on the massacre. The letter and the Book are independent of one another and their commonalities seem to stem from the same oral reports. Ignazio Guidi suggested that the Acta of the martyr Arethas were either written by a certain Sergius, bishop of Rūṣafa, or else dependent on him as a source. Axel Moberg argues that Sergius was probably the author of the Book. Sergius, whose name is also given as George, was served alongside Simeon of Beth Arsham as an envoy of Emperor Justinian I to King Al-Mundhir III of Ḥirtā. David G. K. Taylor has suggested that Stephanos, usually taken to be the scribe of the manuscript, was in fact the author and not the scribe.

The Book was written sometime between the sixth and tenth centuries. Specifically, it achieved its final form no earlier than 526 and no later than 932. It was most likely written closer to the earlier date and is, with the letter of Simeon of Beth Arsham, one of the two earliest sources for the martyrdoms.

== Synopsis ==
The Book of the Himyarites is a work of historiography, not hagiography. Although he "derive[d] from the events he related the moral that could serve to edify his co-religionists", the anonymous author's "principal aim was to give a full historical record of what had happened." Compared to the other sources for the martyrs of Najran, the Book is chronologically broader, covering the rise of Christianity and Judaism in Himyar and the aftermath of the persecution. It is also the most detailed account.

The text of the first six chapters and part of the seventh is lost. From the titles of the first three chapters it seems that they dealt with the paganism of the Himyarites, the adoption of Judaism by the ruling class and the arrival of Christianity. These are followed by chapters on the beginning of the persecution and a first Aksumite (Abyssinian) expedition against Himyar.

=== Précis of chapter headings ===
Owing to damage, not all chapter headings are complete, but most can be reconstructed.

1. Of the Jews and of the badness of their faith
2. Himyarites, who they are and whence they first received Judaism
3. How Christianity began to be sown in Himyar
4. How Bishop Thomas informed the Abyssinians that the Himyarites were persecuting the Christians
5. The first coming of the Abyssinians
6. The amazing sign which the Lord showed the Himyarites in the ranks of the Abyssinians
7. The first departure of the Abyssinians
8. The beginning of the persecution by Masruq, the burning of the church in Zafar and the massacre of the Abyssinians
9. The coming of Masruq to Najran
10. The siege of Najran
11. The martyrdom of the first to suffer in Najran, when he was coming on the road
12. How the pure brethren of the holy order went out to Masruq
13. The burning of the church of Najran
14. The martyrdom by fire of ZRWYba
15. The martyrdom by fire of Tahnah and Aumah, her handmaid
16. The martyrdom of Hadyah, daughter of Tahnah, who also suffered martyrdom by fire
17. The martyrdom of Elishba, the deaconess, and of Ammai, sister of the holy order
18. The martyrdom of the freeborn men of Najran
19. The martyrdom of Harith and Arbai
20. The martyrdom of the freeborn women of Najran and of their young children together with them
21. The martyrdom of Habsa and Hayya, and another Hayya
22. The martyrdom of Ruhm, daughter of Azma; Aumah, her daughter; and Ruhm, her granddaughter
23. Other martyrdom of many women from the town of Najran
24. The martyrdom of men the names of whom we have not been able to learn
25. The contents of the letter that Masruq wrote to Mundhir, king of Hirta, against the Christians
26. The martyrdom of the blessed MHSa, the handmaid of God
27. The departure of Masruq from Najran
28. A martyrdom of [unknown]
29. The martyrs who suffered in Hadramaut
30. Burning of the church in Hadramaut
31. The martyrs who suffered in Marib
32. The martyrs who suffered in Hajaren
33. The martyrdom of D'a, sister of the holy order, and Thummaliki, the laywoman, after the departure of Masruq
34. The martyrdom of Dhiba and Hayya in Najran
35. The martyrdom of Hint and Amma from Najran
36. Dabb and Amr, the Najranites who were kept in custody till the Abyssinians liberated them
37. [unknown]
38. The arrival of the Abyssinians
39. How Umayyah came to Abyssinia and informed Bishop Euprepios and King Kaleb of all that Masruq had done
40. The petition brought by Umayyah to Euprepios and Kaleb as from the church of Himyar
41. The arrival of Kaleb with his army to make war
42. The address that the commander-in-chief made to his army, when he arrived by sea
43. The exhortation that Kaleb addressed to his army after the victory
44. The confessors who were released from Najran, and the sign of the cross on their hands
45. The petition brought to Kaleb by the Christians who had denied but repented, and came to do penance
46. The rebuke that Kaleb made to those Christians
47. The king of Abyssinia appointed a king in Himyar
48. The second address that Kaleb made to those who turned after having denied
49. Conclusion of this book after the return of Kaleb from Himyar

== Influence ==
Moberg, the original editor of the Book, argued that it was the source of the Acta of Arethas, concluding that "the Acta are little more than an extract from some chapters of the Book." The main difference in their perspectives is that the Acta are written from a Byzantine perspective, while the Book has nothing to say about Byzantine involvement in the events of 523.

The Book may also have been a source for a hymn by John Psaltes, composed around 600. The hymn's brief introduction names Dhū Nuwās, the persecutor of Najran, as Masrūq, a name found in the Book.

While the Book is not a source of Simeon's letter, it is useful for interpreting it in light of the latter's tendentiousness.

== Bibliography ==
- Bowersock, Glen W. (2013). The Throne of Adulis: Red Sea Wars on the Eve of Islam. Oxford University Press.
- Lee, Ralph (2011). "The Conversion of King Caleb and the Religious and Political Dynamics of Sixth-Century Ethiopia and Southern Arabia". In Peter Sarris; Matthew Dal Santo; Phil Booth (eds.). An Age of Saints? Power, Conflict and Dissent in Early Medieval Christianity. Brill. pp. 77–88.
- Moberg, Axel (2010) [1924]. The Book of the Himyarites: Fragments of a Hitherto Unknown Syriac Work. Gorgias Press.
- Van Nuffelen, Peter; Van Hoof, Lieve, eds. (2018). Clavis Historicorum Antiquitatis Posterioris. Ghent University.
- Penn, Michael Philip; Johnson, Scott Fitzgerald; Shepardson, Christine; Stang, Charles M., eds. (2022). Invitation to Syriac Christianity: An Anthology. University of California Press.
- Shahīd, Irfan (1963). "The Book of the Himyarites: Authorship and Authenticity". Le Muséon. 76: 349–362.
- Van Rompay, Lucas (2011a). "Ḥimyar". In Sebastian P. Brock; Aaron M. Butts; George A. Kiraz; Lucas Van Rompay (eds.). Gorgias Encyclopedic Dictionary of the Syriac Heritage: Electronic Edition. Beth Mardutho.
- Van Rompay, Lucas (2011b). "Shemʿun of Beth Arsham". In Sebastian P. Brock; Aaron M. Butts; George A. Kiraz; Lucas Van Rompay (eds.). Gorgias Encyclopedic Dictionary of the Syriac Heritage: Electronic Edition. Beth Mardutho.
