= Souk Okaz =

Yearly cultural festival in Saudi Arabia

- سوق عكاظ (Arabic)
- Map of Saudi Arabia showing the location of Souk Okaz
- 21.47436°N 40.64487°E
- Type: Souk
- Periods: Pre-Islamic Arabia
- Location: Taif, Saudi Arabia
- Region: Hejaz

History
- Built: 501
- Abandoned: 745
- Event: Fijar Wars

Site notes
- Condition: Restored
- Management: Ministry of Tourism (Saudi Arabia)

Souk Okaz or Soq Okaz (Arabic: سوق عكاظ, romanized: Sūq ʿUkāẓ, pronounced [suːq ʕʊˈkaːðˤ]), or Al-Ukadh (العكاظ), is a historical souk at Okaz, between Nakhla and Taif, in the Hejaz region of Saudi Arabia. The largest and best known annual fair in pre-Islamic times, today it is a popular tourist destination.

== History ==
Sūq ʿUkāẓ was a seasonal market which operated for twenty-one days each year during the month of Dhu al-Qa'dah prior to the annual Hajj pilgrimage. It competed with the fairs of Majanna and Dhu ’l-Majaz̄, which were also held near Mecca at the same time of year. It was active from approximately 542–726 CE. Strategically located at a central point on the Spice Route through Western Arabia, its growth in the sixth century was partly caused by the Byzantine-Persian wars, which made it harder for Mediterranean markets to access Mesopotamian trade-routes. ʿUkāẓ lay in the territory of the Hawāzin tribal group, and its functions were managed primarily by the Banu Tamim.

The gathering was facilitated by the sanctity of the sacred months during which it was held and its proximity to the holy plain of ʿArafāt. Although primarily for commerce, the market of ʿUkāẓ was an important center where Arabs would meet to formalize tribal rules, settle disputes, pass judgments, make agreements, announce treaties and truces, hold sporting competitions and races, poetry competitions, and religious gatherings; it has been compared in this respect to the ancient Greek institution of the panegyris. It was especially important for poetry competitions, which served to formalize rules of Arabic language verse, grammar and syntax.

The site and its sacrality was significant in the Fijār War of the late sixth century CE (between the Qays-ʿAylān, including the Hawāzin, on the one hand and the Quraysh and Kināna tribes on the other). The war was precipitated by the murder of ʿUrwa al-Raḥḥāl of the Banū ʿĀmir ibn Ṣaʿṣaʿa by al-Barrāḍ ibn Qays al-Ḍmıī Kinānī while ʿUrwa was escorting a Lakhmid caravan from al-Ḥīra to ʿUkāẓ during the holy season. This was considered sacrilegious by the pagan Arabs, hence the war's name, ḥarb al-fijār ('the war of sacrilege'). The site of the market gave its name to a battle in the fourth and final year of the war, yawm ʿUkāẓ ('the day of ʿUkāẓ', also known as yawm Sharab).

The site is prominent in later legends of pre-Islamic Arabian heroes: it allegedly saw preaching visits from the Islamic prophet, Muḥammad and the semi-legendary Christian Quss Ibn Sa'ida al-Iyadi, and is the scene of some stories about Hind bint al-Khuss. Yet the importance of ʿUkāẓ declined after the rise of Islam, because the increasingly sprawling caliphate facilitated new trade routes, and altered the social roles of Arabian tribes. The market was definitively destroyed by the Khārijites in 127 AH (725–726 CE), who sacked it.

The location of Sūq ʿUkāẓ was disputed until historian Muhammad bin Abdallah al-Blahad rediscovered it. A major study was published in 1960 by Saʿīd al-Afghānī.

== Modern Souq ==
A modern souq has been recreated at the location of the historic souq. Each year's souq honors a different poet. The souq covers 14,000,000 m^{2} (3,500 acres) of land. In modern times, as in the past, there are lectures, sporting competitions, poetry, artwork, and items for sale. The souq has 200 shops selling different goods including pottery, silverware, glassware, wall arts and historical manuscripts.

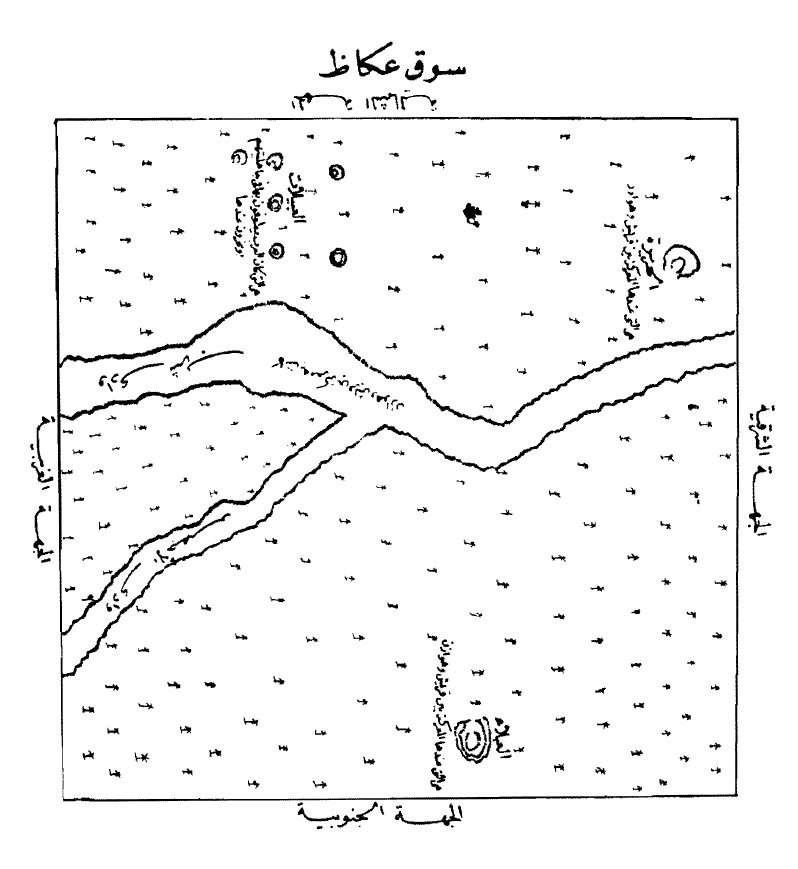
Historical representation

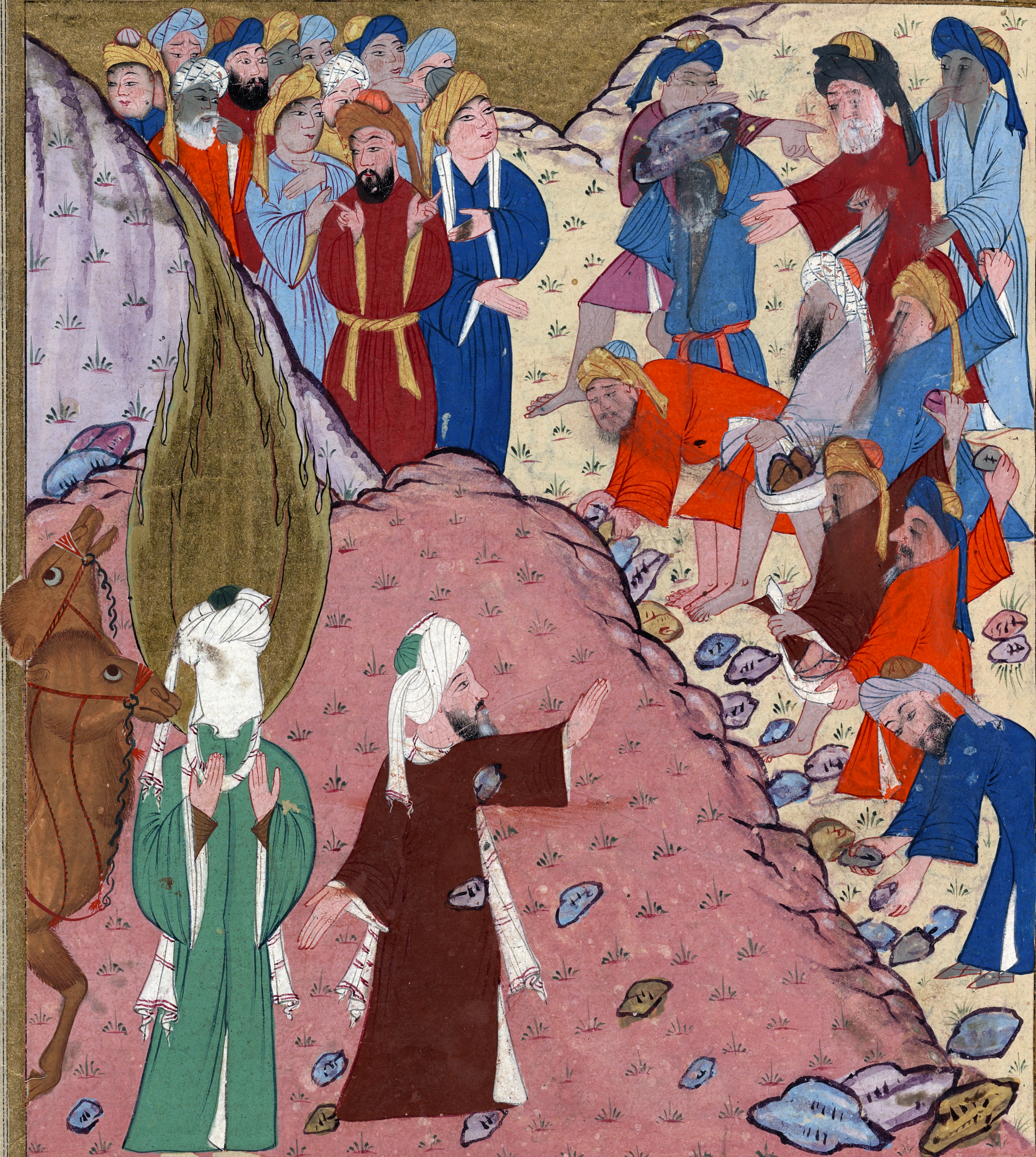
Islamic miniature depicting Meccan Mobs led by Abu Lahab trying to stone Muhammad and Abu Bakr at the Souk of Okaz

== See also ==
- Tourism in Saudi Arabia
