= Al-Burooj =

85th chapter of the Qur'an

Surah 85 of the Quran
البروج Al-Burūj The Stars
- Qira'ah; English text
- Classification: Meccan
- Other names: The Constellations, The Galaxies, The Zodiacal Signs
- No. of verses: 22
- No. of words: 109
- No. of letters: 469

Al-Buruj (Arabic: البروج, romanized: al-burūj, "The Great Star") is the eighty-fifth chapter (surah) of the Quran, with 22 ayat or verses. The word "Al-Burooj" in the first verse is usually translated as 'stars', or more specifically, 'great stars'. The word Al-Burooj is the plural of Burj, which means fort or tower; something that can be seen from a distance.

== Summary ==
The surah opens with an oath by a heaven full of stars.

- 4-7 The "owners of the ditch" (persecutors of believers) are cursed with fire
- 8-9 The believers persecuted for their faith in God
- 10-12 For the infidels is hell-fire, but for believers Paradise
- 13-16 God is Creator and Sovereign Ruler of the universe
- 17-20 Pharaoh and Thamud set as examples to warn those who reject the guidance of God
- 21 The Quran is kept on a guarded tablet

== Exegesis ==
=== 4-8 People of the Ditch ===
Interpreters give several different versions of the story to be referred to in verses 4–8: persecution of Christians by Dhu Nuwas in Yemen, persecutions by Nebuchadnezzar, and people of the trench. It has been documented that Dhu Nuwas burned 20,000 Christians alive in a burning trench because they refused to convert to Judaism.

=== 22 The 'preserved tablet' ===
Quranic exegetes produced different interpretations of the term 'preserved tablet' in verse 22. In this surah the relationship of Quran to the 'Preserved Tablet' is correlated with the relation of the stars 'Al-Buruj' to the heavens 'Al-Sama'. Some of the Mu'tazila argued that revelations were created initially in the preserved tablet. The 'Preserved Tablet' seems to be close to another term, 'Mother of all books' (umm al-kitab), mentioned in Ar-Ra'd 13:39 and Az-Zukhruf 43:4.

== Hadith ==
Ibn 'Abbas, Mujahid, Ad-Dahhaj, Al-Hasan al-Basri, Qatadah and As-Suddi said Burj means stars. Ibn Jareer chose the view that it means the positions of the sun and the moon, which are twelve Burooj. The sun travels through each one of these Burj in one month. The moon travels through each one of these Burj in two-and-a-third days, which makes a total of twenty-eight positions, and it is hidden for two nights [making a month of 30 approximately].

According to a narration from Imam Sadiq, "Whoever recites Surah Al-Buruj, which is a Surah attributed to the prophets, in the obligatory prayer, will be among the prophets, messengers, and righteous people on the Day of Judgment."
