= Rhymed prose =

Prose written with rhyme and rhythm.

Rhymed prose is a literary form and literary genre, written in unmetrical rhymes. This form has been known in many different cultures. In some cases the rhymed prose is a distinctive, well-defined style of writing. In modern literary traditions the boundaries of poetry are very broad (free verse, prose poetry, etc.), and some works may be described both as prose and poetry.

== Arabic culture and influences ==
In classic Arabic literature, a famous form of rhymed prose is known as saj'. Saj' is considered by many to be the earliest form of artistic speech in Arabic dating to pre-Islamic times, and some reconstructions make it out to be a predecessor of metered poetic verse in Arabic. Rajaz may have been an intermediary for this process.

An elaborate Arabic kind of rhymed prose is maqama. It influenced other cultures of the Muslim world, such as Persian (as exemplified by Saadi's Gulestan) and Turkish (tr:Seci). Maqama also influenced the medieval Hebrew literature, a significant amount of which was produced by Jews of the Muslim world. It influenced the style of Yehuda Alharizi, Ibn Zabara, Ibn Hasdai (Abraham ben Samuel ha-Levi ibn Hasdai), Ibn Sahula, Jacob ben Eleazer. The corresponding works were called maqamat or mahbarot (mahberot, e.g., Mahbarot Emmanuel, by Immanuel the Roman).

Arabic rhymed prose was used not only for entertainment or eulogy.

== Chinese culture ==
A Chinese form of elaborate rhymed prose called fu developed as the major literary form particularly associated with the Han dynasty (206 BCE – 220 CE). Generally, the fu type of rhymed prose describes an object, feeling, or other particular subject, using an exhaustive catalog of details and associated vocabulary, and characteristically used both rhyme and prose, variable line lengths, alliteration, onomatopoeia, and some parallelism. Topics of fu rhymed prose could vary from the exalted to the everyday: it was sometimes used to eloquently glorify the emperors; but, other topics of well-known fu included encyclopedic catalogs of minerals, types of pasta, and the species of plants a poet might expect to encounter during an exile due to political disfavor. The style of the National Anthem of the Republic of China follows that of a four-character poem (四言詩), also called a four-character rhymed prose (四言韻文), which first appeared during the Zhou dynasty. The fu literary form was at first classed with poetry, but later bibliographies classified fu at the head of prose works.

== Indian culture ==
Rhymed prose was common in early Khariboli Hindi texts, such as Premsagar (Prem Sagur) by Lallu Lal and Naasiketopaakhyan by Sadal Mishra, in early 19th century but gradually fell into disuse. The paper traces possible origins of the Hindi rhyming prose in Islamic and Sanskrit literature.

== European cultures ==
Rhymed prose was a characteristic feature of the Divine Office until the end of the 12th century. A type of the "rhymed office" were offices in rhymed prose, i.e., in irregular rhythm. Later it was gradually replaced by rhythmical office. They were popular in France and Germany, and a number of prominent composers of rhymed offices are known.

A kind of jesting rhymed prose in Russian culture is known as rayok.

== Sources ==
- Frolov, Dimitry (2000). "Archaic Verse: Sajʾ". Classical Arabic Verse: History and Theory of 'Arūḍ. Brill. pp. 97–134. ISBN 978-90-04-49245-5.
