= Al-Maydani =

Al-Maydani is a surname. Notable people with the surname include:

- Ahmad ibn Muhammad al-Maydani (died 1124), Khorasani philologist
- Abd al-Ghani al-Ghunaymi al-Maydani (1807–1881), Syrian jurist and traditionist
