= Al-Suddī =

Islamic preacher

Ismāʿīl ibn ʿAbd al-Raḥmān al-Suddī (died 745) was a popular preacher and Qurʾānic exegete in Kūfa. His nickname al-Suddī comes from his habit of sitting on the threshold (sudd) of the Great Mosque of Kūfa. His status as a traditionist is unclear, since his presence in isnāds is often inauthentic and he was sometimes accused of fabrication. He criticized Abū Bakr and ʿUmar and was accused of having Shīʿī tendencies (tashayyuʿ). His reputation rests on his exegesis, which was considered inconsequential by al-Shaʿbī and merely "popular" by Ibrāhīm al-Nakhaʿr, but was cited extensively in al-Ṭabarī's Tafsīr.

Al-Suddī relied on Jewish and Christian traditions. His accounts "are to a large extent essentially rewritten Qurʾan, reminiscent of the qiṣaṣ al-anbiyāʾ", the stories about the prophets. He is probably responsible for an account of the episode of the Satanic verses which depicts Muḥammad, unaware of what he has uttered, being carried through the city of Mecca on the shoulders of his cheering companions before being corrected by Gabriel.

== Bibliography ==
- Ahmed, Shahab (2017). Before Orthodoxy: The Satanic Verses in Early Islam. Harvard University Press.
- Juynboll, G. H. A. (1997). "al-Suddī". In Bosworth, C. E.; van Donzel, E.; Heinrichs, W. P. & Lecomte, G. (eds.). The Encyclopaedia of Islam, Second Edition. Volume IX: San–Sze. Leiden: E. J. Brill. p. 762. ISBN 978-90-04-10422-8.
- Witzum, Joseph (2022). "Deaf Hishām and Esau's Death". Jewish Quarterly Review. 112 (3): 378–405. doi:10.1353/jqr.2022.0022.
