= Christianity in pre-Islamic Arabia =

Arabian Christianity's growth, distribution before Islam

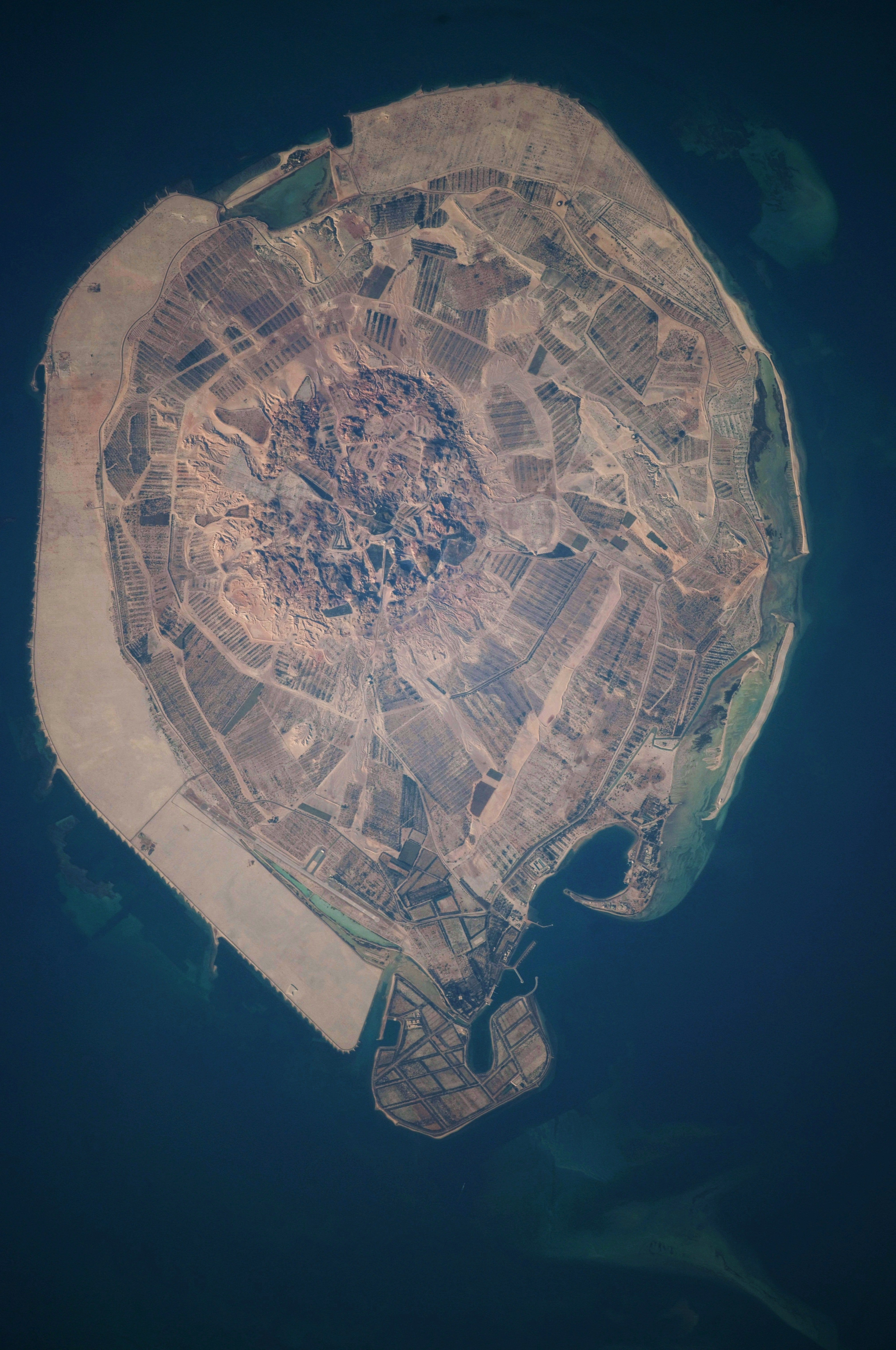
Aerial view of Sir Bani Yas Island in the United Arab Emirates, which was home to a famous Church of the East monastery in the seventh and eighth centuries

Religion in pre-Islamic Arabia was historically traditional, local polytheistic religions. In the fourth century, Christianity became the dominant religion in the Roman Empire, Armenia, and Ethiopia, and began to make ground among large populations of Roman Arabs across the Sinai Peninsula, Jordan, southern Syria, and in the interior of the Arabian Peninsula, where large populations of Arab Christians emerged.

The most significant populations of Arab Christians formed among Roman populations, especially in the province of Roman Arabia, and on the Arabian Peninsula, in Eastern Arabia and South Arabia, with local populations also forming in the Hejaz. With the growth of Christianity in the Arabian Peninsula in the fifth and sixth centuries, churches, monasteries, cathedrals, and martyria were built. These new institutions allowed local leaders to display benefaction towards their communities, communicate with local leaders, and act as points of communication with Christian communities abroad, such as Byzantine Christians. Major Christian centers were assigned into bishoprics, so that a bishop could act as the local religious leader for the Christians in the region. Bishoprics appeared across Eastern Arabia, North Arabia, and South Arabia (especially in Najran and Zafar).

The growth of Christianity on the Arabian Peninsula was driven by proselytism: the mains sources of proselytism were missionaries from Christian churches, especially Syrian churches, from the Byzantine Empire, Christian Iraqi populations in the Sasanian Empire (particularly from Al-Hira), and Ethiopian Christians from the newly converted Kingdom of Aksum, who, in the early sixth century, conquered Himyar, the ruling power over South Arabia. Byzantine Christians wrote many stories about holy men and miracle workers active in converting Arabs, turning them away from pagan and polytheistic idolatry. Arabian Christianity is also known from the Quran, the holy scripture of Islam, and a growing number of pre-Islamic Arabian inscriptions. Arabian Christianity did not immediately decline following the early Muslim conquests, with the most severe economic and other pressures leading to the decline of the Christian communities coming in the eighth century onwards.

== Arab Christianity in the Roman Empire ==
Outside of the Arabian Peninsula, large populations of Arabs lived in the Roman Empire and in other places in the Near East. After the conversion of Constantine the Great to Christianity in the early fourth century, large swathes of these Arabs converted to Christianity. Even before this, Abgar VIII, the Arab king of the Osroene Kingdom (known also as the "Kingdom of Edessa") converted to Christianity around 200 AD, making Abgar the first head of state in world history to convert to Christianity, and the Edessan kingdom the first Christian state. Abgar's conversion also provided a place of protection for Christians in the time from Roman persecution, and turned Edessa into a spiritual capital of Syriac Christianity, a counterpart to the role played by Antioch in Greek Christianity. Even before Constantine, the emperor Philip the Arab was also speculated by fourth-century Christians to have privately converted to Christianity, although his reign was short.

Constantine's conversion ushered in a three-century period of the rise of Christianity among Roman Arab populations. In Syria, this included the conversion of the tribe of the Tanukhids in the fourth century, the Salihids in the fifth century, and in the sixth century, the Ghassanids, who rose to power as Rome's primary and most powerful Arab client kingdom at this time. Their doctrine was Monophysitism, and they widely sponsored Christian churches and monasteries in their areas across Syria. In Mesopotamia (Iraq), this was initiated by Abgar's conversion; his territory was conquered by the Romans in the 240s AD. After this conquest, the Mesopotamian center of the region transitioned from Edessa to Al-Hira, the capital of the Lakhmid kingdom. The Lakhmids ruled Al-Hira for three centuries, during which it became a major Christian center. The city became an episcopal see with a bishop around 410 AD. Vast numbers of churches and convents were built, to the point that it fascinated the eighth-century Muslim author Hisham ibn al-Kalbi enough to write a book about it, which has largely been lost, except for quotation of a long inscription he documented from later Islamic authors. Christian Hira may have even been the place where the Arabic script was developed. Towards the very end of the Lakhmid period, the final Lakhmid king, Al-Nu'man III, also converted to Christianity.

== North Arabia ==
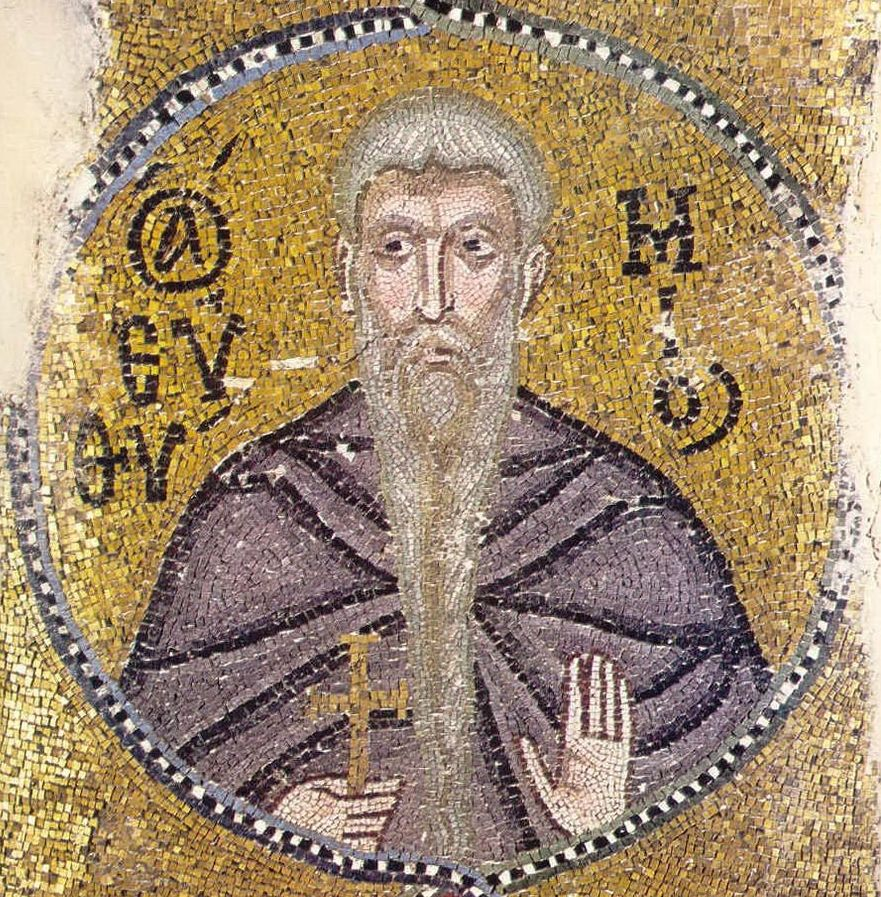
Mosaic of Euthymius the Great at Neo Moni of Chios

The first accounts of Christians and Christian conversion in Arabia appear in the New Testament in the first century, including in Paul the Apostle's Letter to the Galatians (1:15–17) and the Book of Acts (Acts 2:8, 11). In the mid-third century, Christian institutions organized two church councils, known now as the Councils of Arabia, to condemn the heresy of Beryllus of Bostra, the earliest recorded bishop in the province of Roman Arabia seated in the metropolis Bostra, for believing that both body and soul are lost between death and the Last Judgement (Ecclesiastical History, 6:37). By the fourth century, significant communities of Christians existed among desert Arabs, especially in the Sinai Peninsula and the province of Roman Arabia. Saint Moses, named "Apostle of the Saracens" by the Romans, was a hermit and, at the behest of the Syrian Arab warrior-queen Mawiyya of the Tanukhid tribe, became another one of the first known Arab bishops.

The growth of Christianity among Arabs was fuelled by missionary efforts. Many hagiographical sources record stories of Christian holy men converting groups of Arabs to Christianity. These stories followed a common template: first, an Arabian community interacts with a monk (or other kind of holy man). Shortly afterwards, the community renounces polytheism and idol worship. Finally, a church is built. Missionaries described in these accounts included Ahudemmeh (d. 575), Euthymius the Great (d. 473), Simeon Stylites (died 459), and the events leading to the construction of the shrine of St. Sergius at Resafa patronized by Al-Mundhir III, leader of the Ghassanid tribe.

Jerome (in the Life of St Hilarion 16.1–12) says that Saint Hilarion converted the Arabs of Elusa, a city located southwest of the Dead Sea, who worshipped the goddess Venus. After exorcising demons from many of their members, they flocked to him and ask for his blessing. Idol worship ended and Hilarion helped them lay the plan for building a church before his departure. The Life of Euthymius by Cyril of Scythopolis says that Euthymius the Great, the abbot of Israel, was approached by an Arab of the Persian army, Aspebetos, to cure his sons sickness. When Euthymius did this, Aspebetos converted and defected to the Romans along with the rest of his clan. Another figure, Ahudemmeh, was said to "visit all the camps of the Arabs, instructing and teaching them in many sermons .... establishing in every tribe a priest and a deacon ... and founding churches and naming them after tribal chiefs."

A number of known tribal conversions to Christianity happened from the fourth to sixth centuries, including of the then-dominant Byzantine foederati, the Salihids, around 400 (following the decision of their leader Zokomos), the Ghassanids at the beginning of the reign of their leader Al-Harith ibn Jabalah (r. 528–569), and the Lakhmids during the reign of their final king of the Nasrid dynasty, Al-Nu'man III, in the late 6th century. There is also some evidence that the Taghlib and Tanūkhid tribes had converted.

The Ghassanid Kingdom (220–638 AD)

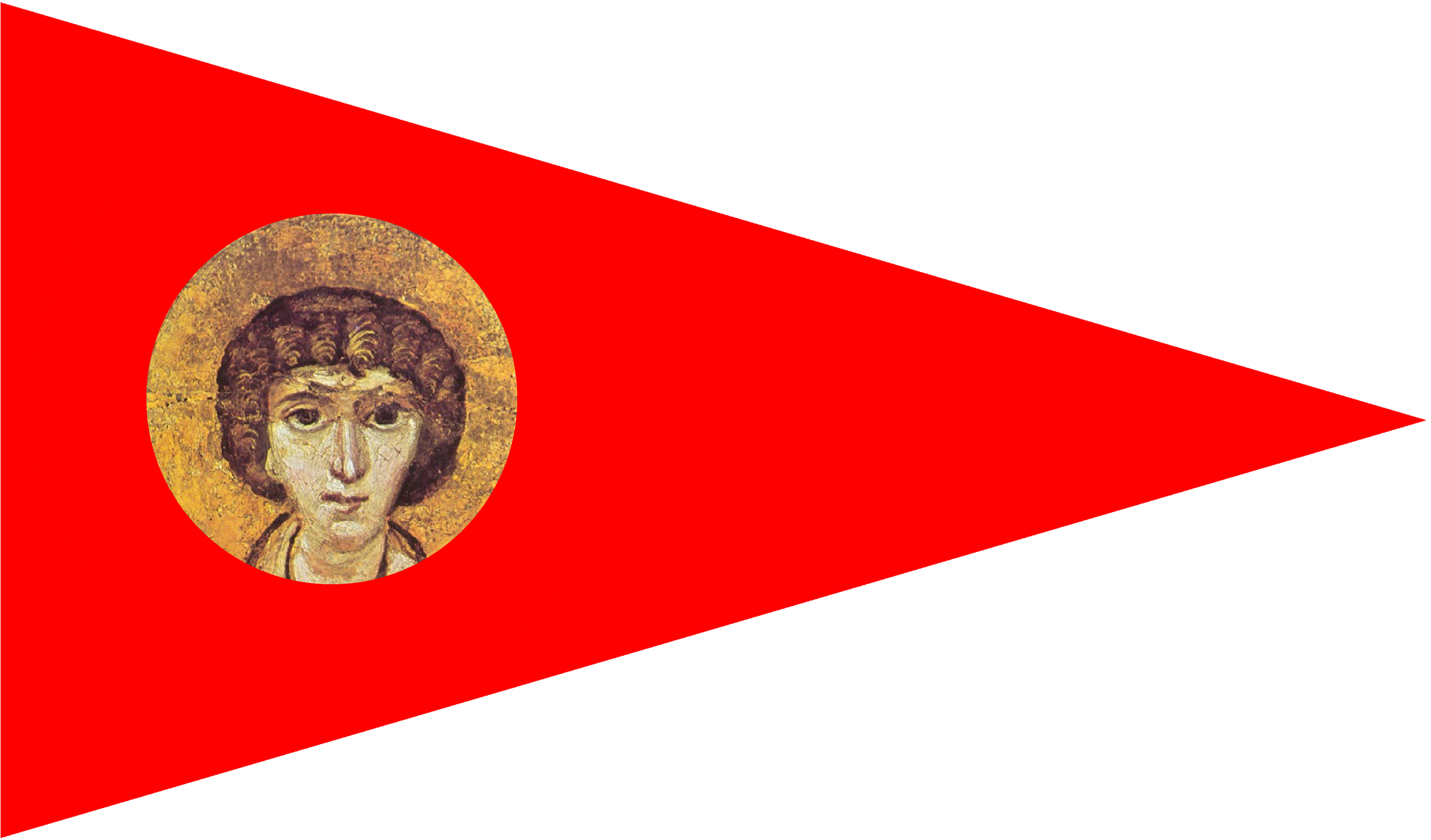
The war banner of the Ghassanids, bearing the picture of Saint Sergius

Map of the Ghassanid Kingdom under al-Mundhir III ibn al-Harith

Arab kings became involved in imperial church affairs and in theological debates, and helped organize meetings between members at the highest authorities in the churches of the empire. The most important of these were the Ghassanids, who controlled a kingdom in the Levant and in northern Arabia. John of Ephesus describes the convert king, al-Harith, as helping appoint bishops and exercising authority in the "southern and [eastern] countries and in the whole of the desert and in Arabia [Petraea] and Palestine". The Ghassanids became leading patrons of the Miaphysites and sponsored the martyr cult of St Sergius, popular among Arabs. Mutually, the Miaphysites sent missionaries into Arabia. Epigraphic evidence suggests they sponsored multiple Christian sites, including the shrine of St Sergius, a basilica in al-Ruṣāfa, and a three-church complex in Nitl (near Madaba). The Ghassanids are also linked to three Christian Paleo-Arabic inscriptions from Syria, including the Jebel Usays inscription, the Harran inscription, and the Zabad inscription. The Zabad inscription was found at a martyrium at the Church of St. Sergius. Other inscriptions at martyria mention more sponsors with Arab names.

Around the year 569 or 570, Al-Harith ibn Jabalah convened a conference in the province of Roman Arabia towards resolving a theological debate at the time. A letter from the conference has survived, known as the Letter of the Archimandrites (preserved in the Documenta Monophysitarum), and it contains the signatures of the representatives (being the Archimandrite) of 137 different monasteries, indicating a widespread systematic presence of Christians in Roman Arabia, territorially centered in modern-day Jordan and adjacent regions.

A growing amount of archaeological evidence for Christians in the region is known. A monastery has been discovered at Kilwa, located in northwest Arabia in the Tabuk Province of Saudi Arabia, dedicated to Saint Thecla, a disciple of Paul the Apostle. The monastery might have been established at the eve of Islam. Its presence in the arid desert indicates that some nomadic Arab tribes had converted by that time. A growing number of Christian inscriptions in the area are also known, especially in the Paleo-Arabic script, such as the Jebel Usays inscription, Harran inscription, Zabad inscription, and the Umm al-Jimal inscription. The Umm al-Jimal inscription was discovered in the northern part of the Double Church at Umm al-Jimal. In 2021, the first Christian Safaitic inscription, dating to the fourth century, was found, invoking the aid of Jesus to cure the maternal uncle of the author. The text calls Jesus ʿĪsâ, the earliest use of this grammatical form before the Quran.

== South Arabia ==
Christianity was introduced into South Arabia in the fourth century. Towards the end of the fifth century, Christianity's presence was strong enough that the Synodicon orientale says that a "Moses of Himyar" attended a synod in 486 AD. During the sixth century, bishoprics are described in the capital Zafar (Gregentios), Najran, and Qana'. It was also in this period that the Christian community of Najran faced severe persecution, precipitating an invasion by the nearby Christian Ethiopian Kingdom of Aksum, leading to official Christian rule for decades.

=== Early missionary efforts ===
According to the Greek historian Philostorgius (d. 439) in his Ecclesiastical History 3.4, Constantius II, the successor of Constantine the Great, sent an Arian bishop known as Theophilus the Indian (also known as "Theophilus of Yemen") to Tharan Yuhanim, then the king of the South Arabian Himyarite Kingdom to convert the people to Christianity. According to the report, Theophilus succeeded in establishing three churches, one of them in the capital Zafar. From the fifth and sixth centuries, the Miaphysite church displayed a significant interest in expanding missionary activity in the Himyarite Kingdom.

The story of the introduction of Christianity into South Arabia, especially into the city of Najran, is known in many different versions, in many different later Christian and Islamic sources. According to the Chronicle of John of Nikiu, a woman named Theognosta was the first to convert south Arabians to Christianity in the mid-fourth century. According to the Book of the Himyarites and the Chronicle of Seert, the first South Arabian Christian was a man named Hannan (spelled as Ḥannān, or Ḥayyān). He was an international merchant, first travelling towards Constantinople in the Byzantine realm, and then to Al-Hira in the Persian realm. During his exposure to Christianity in the Persian world, he converted and was baptized. Upon returning to Najran, he began sharing his faith with others and other members of the community also began to convert. Ibn Ishaq, an Islamic source, offers a different story: a Christian Syrian named Faymiyūn ended up as a slave in Najran. His manner of praying shocked the Najran community, leading to a mass conversion. The Book of the Tower by Amr ibn Matta says that because of the missionary work of the famous Mār Māri, a student of Addai of Edessa, Christianity had already arrived to South Arabia before the time of a figure known to Amr ibn Matta as Aphrahat the King of Babylon (c. 270–345). Other versions of the story also permeated the Arab-Islamic tradition, some focusing on the miracles of a man named Abdallah ibn Tahmir that Faymiyūn was ministering to, and another centered on a secret conversion of a Himyarite king.

=== Najran ===
Christianity may have been introduced into Najran in the fifth century, plausibly through trade routes. Though the details about Christianity's introduction into the area cannot be recovered in spite of the many varied stories, an involvement of the trade routes of Al-Hira are possible. Several explicitly Christian inscriptions are known from the Hima Paleo-Arabic inscriptions, located at a site near Najran, with the texts dates covering the late fourth to early fifth centuries. Many of these contain Christian iconography, including large and ornate crosses, establishing a notable Christian community in the region which had produced them. For example, Ḥimà-al-Musammāt PalAr 5 contains a cross and describes a figure named "῾Abd al-Masīḥ" ("the servant of Christ"). A Greek inscription, likely Christian, has been found north of Najran which reads "Lord, protect me."

The Christian community of Najran experienced waves of persecution before the massacre of the Jewish king Dhu Nuwas, likely beginning around 470. The Martyrdom of Azqir reports that Najran's first priest, Azqir, was transferred to the Himyarite capital Zafar where he was beheaded on the advice of a group of rabbis to create an example against introducing a new religion into the region. The first bishop of Najran, named Paul, was stoned to death sometime afterwards but before 500. Ethiopian sources describe a persecution of Najran's Christians during the reign of the Himyarite king Sharhabil Yakkuf (468–480 AD). Later, the Syriac poet Jacob of Serugh wrote a letter of consolation to the Christian community of Najran (his Letter to the Himyarites), sometime before his death in 521, indicating another wave of persecution prior to the massacre of 523. Finally, the Book of the Himyarites says that an (unidentified) bishop named Thomas appealed to the aid of the Kingdom of Aksum in the face of the Himyarite persecution of the Najran Christians.

Beginning in 522, the Jewish king Dhū Nuwās initiated a series of campaigns against Christians in South Arabia, including Himyarite locals and Aksumites in the region. The massacre is also recounted in a celebratory manner in an inscription (Ja 1028) commissioned by one of the army commanders of Dhu Nuwas. According to his inscriptions, Dhu Nuwas himself captured and burned down the churches of the cities of Zafar and Al-Mukāʾ. Then, three inscriptions (Ja 1028, Ry 507, and Ry 508) describe the campaigns of Sharahil Yaqbul dhu-Yazan against Najran (despatched by Dhu Nuwas) and the ensuing massacre. According to these inscriptions, Sharahil "positioned himself against Najran" (laying it to siege). He blocked the Najran's caravan route to the northeast that would have led to both Qaryat al-Faw and eastern Arabia to put economic pressure on the city. After a thirteen month long siege, Sharahil captured Najran, which resulted in a large plunder of the area and a stated execution of 12,500 people from the city. Part of the success of the capture involved, according to Simeon's letters, an offer made by Dhu Nuwas that relinquishing control of the area would result in guarantees for the safety of the Christians, which Dhu Nuwas was said to have sworn an oath over, on a Torah scroll, and in the presence of several rabbis. However, Dhu Nuwas broke his promise, and the massacre ensued. The massacre became a moment of international outrage among Christians, with Syriac authors writing many works about the massacre of the Christian community of Najran, including the Book of Himyarites and Simeon's Letter on the Himyarite Martyrs. There is also the Greek Martyrdom of Arethas. A particular moment of outrage, according to Simeon's letters, was how Dhu Nuwas ordered the bones of Najran's bishops to be exhumed, collected in a church, and then burned up there alongside other Christian laity and clerics.

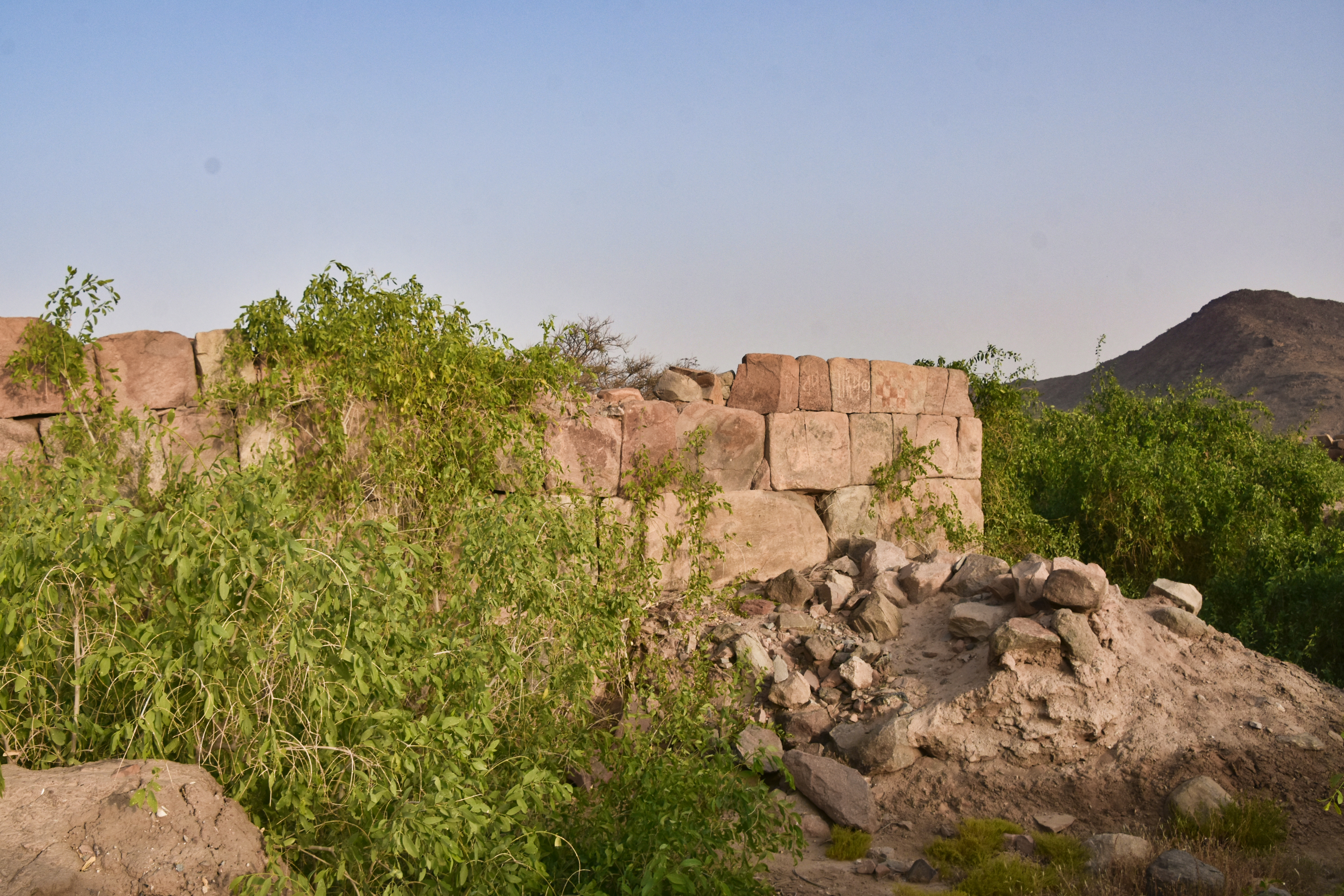
Ruins of the Kaaba of Najran near the ruins of Al-Okhdood

At Najran, Christians built churches, monasteries, and martyria. In the aftermath of the massacre, the Ḥārith ibn Kaʿb clan of the Christian community built a martyrium dedicated to the martyred Christians known as the Kaaba of Najran, one of several pre-Islamic Arabian Kaabas. This Kaaba became a point of pilgrimage, and its custodians were from Banū ʿAbd al-Madān, the chief clan of the tribe of Balḥārith. As such, Najran became one of the holy cities of Eastern Christianity. The Kaaba may also be identical to another martyrium described in the city, the Martyry of Arethas, constructed around 520. In addition to the Kaaba Najran, three churches from Najran are known: the Church of the Ascension of Christ, the Church of the Holy Martyrs and the Glorious Arethas, and the Church of the Holy Mother of God. Monasticism (involving monks and monasteries) is also documented.

Najran was the only episcopal see in the Arabian Peninsula apart from those in Eastern Arabia. The first bishops of Najran are mentioned by the letter written in 524 of Simeon, the bishop of Beth Arsham. According to Simeon, Philoxenus of Mabbug consecrated two bishops, both called Mar Pawlos (Paul). Both died during the massacre, the first during the siege of Zafar, and the second in Najran before its final surrender to Dhu Nuwas. The consecration being done by Philoxenus, a leading member of the Syrian Orthodox Church, indicates a Miaphysite, non-Chalcedonian Christianity at Najran. John Diakrinomenos says that a bishop named Silvanus travelled to an unspecific place in the Himyarite Kingdom. The Letter on the Himyarite Martyrs by Simeon of Beth Arsham mentions two more people in South Arabia with connections to John of Tella and a monastery in the city of Edessa. Islamic sources name bishops, like the legendary Quss Ibn Sa'ida al-Iyadi, a contemporary of Muhammad. Sources continue naming bishops of Najran into the Islamic era, up until the 9th and 10th centuries.

The Christian community of Najran was also linked with Syriac Christianity. A Syriac inscription from the sixth or seventh century has been found just north of Najran, and it uses a common phrase known from Syriac liturgy. Some clergymen from Najran were trained in Syriac monasteries to produce Syriac texts. Jacob of Serugh, a Syriac poet from the Near East, wrote letters to the Christians of Najran in his language, particularly his Letter to the Himyarites. Furthermore, Christian texts from the Church of the East link the origins of Christianity in Najran to the work of Syriac Christian missionaries through the Mesopotamian city of Al-Hira, which is also documented to have sent missionaries to Socotra, an island off of Yemen.

Two strands of the Islamic tradition commented on Christian community of Najran: those sources commenting on the Quranic story of the People of the Ditch, believed by many to be about the massacre of Najran's Christians, and South Arabian Muslims with an antiquarian interest in the regions pre-Islamic history.

Christianity survived in Najran into the Islamic period. Muhammad is said to have sent a delegation to the Najrani Christian community, and there is a fable claiming that the Christians of Najran were expelled by the caliph Umar. According to the traveler Ibn al-Mujawir (d. 1292), Christianity survived in Najran until the 13th century.

=== Socotra ===
Christianity was introduced into the Yemeni island of Socotra in the 5th century. A travel report from around 518 AD of Cosmas Indicopleustes says that Socotra had a "multitude of Christians", as well as clerics appointed from Persia (likely of Nestorian background). According to Portuguese sources, a vestigial form of Christianity may have been practiced on Socotra as late as the 16th century. Christianity's introduction may have been facilitated by Greek-speaking communities on the island, which Yaqut al-Hamawi says were the first to embrace Christianity, and some place names on the island have been suggested to be related to the Greek word for "cathedral". According to Al-Hamdani, a Sasanian emperor expelled a Greek community on the island, which later (along with members of Mahri tribes on the mainland) embraced Christianity. Christian material culture has been found on the island, including crosses in Socotran rock art from multiple sites, a church that has been dated between the 7th and 10th centuries, and pottery vessels at burial sites decorated with crosses.

=== Christianity as the official religion ===
The massacre of the Christian community of Najran precipitated an invasion by the nearby Christian kingdom in Ethiopia, leading to the conquest of Himyar in 525 and the end of the Jewish leadership of southern Arabia and the beginning of Christian rule. Sumyafa Ashwa came into power, but he was soon overthrown by his rival Abraha, initiating a period of Ethiopian Christian rule over southern Arabia in 530. Historians continue to debate the relative role of religion in the decision to invade South Arabia, as to whether it was the main cause (responding to local aggression against Christians) or whether it was used to legitimate an invasion whose motives were more rooted in material and political incentives.

Christianity became the official religion of South Arabia after the Aksumite conquests and several churches were built. A church being built off the coast of Yemen is mentioned in RIÉ 191, and the Marib Dam inscription mentions a priest, a monastery, and its abbot.

Continuing with the Jewish period, Christian inscriptions call God Rahmanan. They also have crosses and references to Christ as the Messiah and to the Holy Spirit. CIH 541 mentions Abraha sponsoring a church for Marib, describes celebrations hosted by a priest at another church, and invokes the Messiah and the Spirit. Abraha celebrated the construction of the dam by holding mass in the city church and inviting ambassadors from Rome and Persia. Later Islamic historiography also ascribes to Abraha the construction of a church at Sanaa. Christian J. Robin argues Abraha's inscriptions bear a relatively low Christology, perhaps to assuage the Jewish population, with formula resembling descriptions of Jesus in the Quran. Whereas Abraha's predecessor Kaleb of Axum explicitly calls Jesus the Son of Rahmanan and "Victor", and used Trinitarian formulae, Abraha only called Jesus the "Messiah" (not Son). Shoemaker argues that it is doubtful that Himyarite Christians would have not accepted Jesus' Sonship, as no such form of Christianity from these centuries is known, and that the small number of inscriptions mean that more explicit inscriptions may just not have been found.

Abraha severed ties between the Himyarite and Ethiopian churches, realigning himself with the Syriac Christianity centred at Syria and Antioch. Religious terminology from Ethiopian loanwords were systematically replaced with Syriac equivalents, including the words for Messiah, church, and priest. Because of Abraha's conquests, Abraha's influence may have extended to eastern Arabia, central Arabia, and western Arabia (the Hejaz), including his capture of Medina.

Some South Arabian inscriptions are influenced by the Bible. The Jabal Dabub inscription contains a pre-Islamic variant of the Basmala and has been argued by Ahmad Al-Jallad to rephrase parts of Psalm 90 and Psalm 123. Several inscriptions found in South Arabia, written in the Ge'ez script from the time of Kaleb of Axum, quote the Book of Isaiah, Psalms, Gospel of Matthew, and less certainly, the Book of Genesis.

Inscriptions from South Arabia disappear after 560.

== East Arabia and Gulf Coast ==
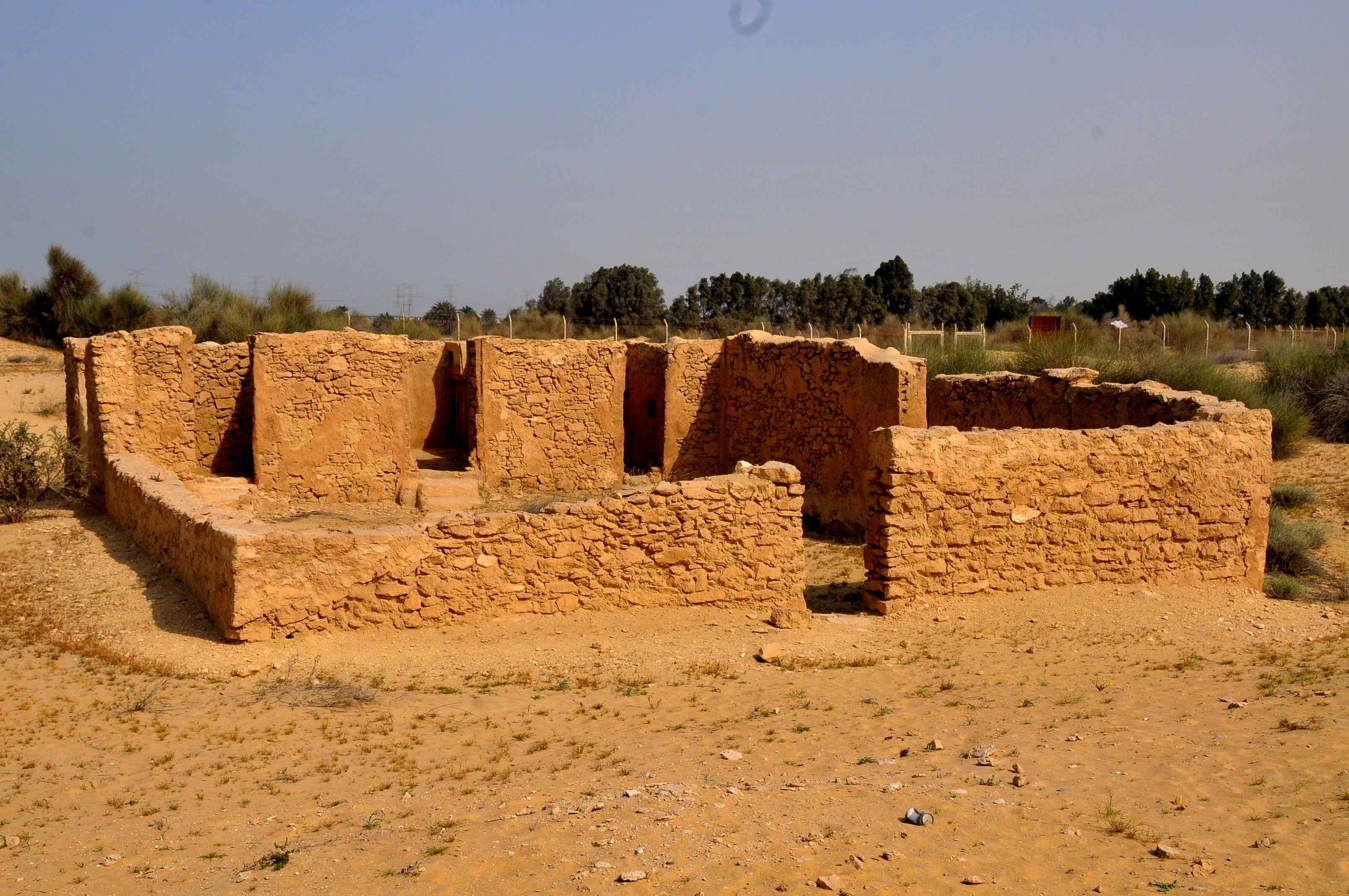
Jubail Church in eastern Saudi Arabia. The 4th century remains are thought to be one of the oldest surviving church buildings in the world.

Christianity was present on the Eastern coast of the Arabian peninsula by the late fourth century. By the fifth century, East Arabian Christian communities organized and had monks and bishops, and the Christian community in the region begins appearing in many records. The main literary sources for East Arabian Christianity are the international Christian synod records compiled into the Synodicon Orientale, the letters of Ishoyahb III, the Khuzistan Chronicle, the Chronicle of Seert, and the History of Mar Yawnan. Much of the Christian populations of Eastern Arabia, especially the Beth Qatraye region, were made up of Syriac Christians. While Qatrayith was their spoken language, Syriac was their written and liturgical language. They used the Peshitta Bible and even translated writings from foreign languages into Syriac, such as the Persian Law Book of Simeon of Rev Ardashir. The church of Beth Qatraye was the Church of the East, and it was a suffragan of the Persian metropolitan see of Rev Ardashir, under the authority and patriarchate of Seleucia-Ctesiphon.

Four monasteries have been discovered in Eastern Arabia. The most famous is the Church of the East monastery on Sir Bani Yas, but there are also monasteries at Kharg Island, al‐Quṣūr (in Failaka Island), and Siniyah Island. Monasteries were centers of Christian scholarship, intellectual activity, and theology. The province of Beth Qatraye where the Sir Bani Yas monastery is located, whose name originates as the Syriac term for "territory of the Qataris", is notable for the number of Christian authors it produced with surviving writings into the present, including: Dadisho Qatraya, Isaac of Qatar, Gabriel of Qatar, Gabriel Arya, Abraham Qatraya, Ahob of Qatar, and the anonymous translator of Simeon of Rev Ardashir.

One of the dominant powers over Eastern Arabia was the Lakhmid kingdom, the principal Arab client kingdom of the Sasanian Empire, whose rule was centered in Mesopotamia, at their capital Al-Hira. Initially pagan, they slowly transitioned to Christianity from the fourth to late sixth centuries. In the fourth century, they, and the Zoroastrian Sasanians, had a contentious relationship with their Christian minority, periodically shifting between tolerance and persecution. As the Christian minority grew and become more influential, especially at Al-Hira, a tolerant approach was preferred and a native Christian church was fostered, independent of that of the Romans. By 410 AD, Al-Hira had a bishop.

Al-Hira became a major base for missionary activity, acting as a gateway for launching missions to the rest of the Sasanian world, on the one hand, and the Arabs of the desert, on the other. Some of the most detailed information about the Christianity of the Lakhmid A-Hira comes from the Chronicle of Seert which, despite its late final date, is likely a redaction of multiple earlier records, including some written down very close to the events. (Independent records for this history are also found in the Khuzistan Chronicle and the Arabo-Islamic tradition.) The Chronicle records the missionary activities of the great monastic founder, Abraham of Kashkar, at Al-Hira. It also talks about how many of the Lakhmid kings engaged with the Christian presence of the city, and a long account of the final king, who did convert.

Al-Mundhir III, in the mid-6th century, married the princess Hind of the Hujrid dynasty of the Kingdom of Kinda. While he did not become a Christian, Hind converted to Christianity, and even sponsored the construction of a monastery, now known as the Monastery of Hind the Elder, in the Lakhmid capital. She also may have sponsored Christian monasteries and activities in Eastern Arabia. Later, her great-granddaughter, also named Hind, sponsored the Monastery of Hind the Younger near Kufa.

The final Lakhmid king, Al-Nu'man III, converted to Christianity, briefly introducing Christian rule into the area. His conversion is said to have been precipitated by Simeon Jabara, the bishop of Al-Hira. The Persians did not look favorably on this conversion, and made efforts to reconvert him out of his new faith.

=== History by region ===
==== Qatar ====
The Chronicle of Arbela claims that a bishopric in Beth Qatraye around the year 225, but the Chronicle is likely a later forgery. The first concrete evidence of a highly organized Christian presence in the region of modern-day Qatar is in the description of the synods held at Seleucia-Ctesiphon between 410 and 776, as documented in the eighth-century Synodicon Orientale. The signatory Qatari bishop of this synod was stated to have replaced an earlier bishop, pushing back the date of organized Christianity in this region to the late fourth century. The Synodicon shows that four dioceses existed in the region connected to Persia. The earliest and largest of these dioceses was Mashmahig mentioned at the 410 synod, led by the bishop Elijah (Elias). The last known "bishop and metropolitan of the land of Qaṭar" was named Thomas, who signed his name on the synod in 676. The second largest diocese, Darain was located on the island of Toduro (modern Tarout Island) and was founded during the 410 synod. It was led by the bishop Paul. The third diocese, Hajar, was founded during the Synod of 576 under Bishop Isaac. The 676 synod divided it into two, the Hajar and Hatta dioceses. During this event, Hatta became the fourth and last diocese to be founded in Qatar. Later, Isaac the Syrian (613–700), also known as Isaac of Qatar, would grow up in Qatar before he was ordained and became a monk in Iraq. Other prominent Qatari Christians born in the pre-Islamic period include Gabriel of Qatar, Abraham bar Lipeh, and Ahob of Qatar.

One literary account, a seventh- or eighth-century hagiography, mentions more monasteries. The History of Mar Yawnan (or Saint Jonah) says that a monastery was constructed on the "Black Island" (likely to be Sir Bani Yas) between 343 to 346 AD.

==== Other Gulf countries ====
In Oman, a diocese was established by the name of Beth Mazunaye in the Synod of 424 under the Bishop John. It was mentioned again at the synods of 544, 576, and 767. In the mid-seventh century, the Patriarch of the Church of the East, Isho'yahb, sent a letter to Qataris wherein he described the presence of several faithful communities, including Talun, which is a now an island of Bahrain. The philologist Al-Asmaʿi reported while discussing a figure named Ibn Yāmin, that the people of Yāmin were Christians in Bahrain. This accords with the Jewish or Christian etymology of their name, related to Hebrew Bīnyāmīn or Benjamin, "son of the right side."

=== Archaeology by region ===
Archaeological discoveries of Christian occupation have been made across Eastern Arabia. This material culture is usually dated from the sixth to ninth centuries. Unfortunately, the lack of contemporary inscriptions has presented difficulties in dating them.

==== Akkaz ====
In 1993 a joint Kuwaiti-French expedition found a church in Akkaz (in present Kuwait) dating to the early Abbasid era. The church was in the eastern church style and is symmetrical to that of Failaka.

==== Failaka ====
Remnants of a church, dating to perhaps as early as the 5th or 6th century as determined by the crosses that form part of the stucco decoration, were found at Al-Qusur on the Kuwaiti island of Failaka. Pottery at the site can be dated from as early as the first half of the 7th century through the 9th century.

==== Kharg ====
Several tombs have been found decorated with distinctive Nestorian crosses on Kharg Island of Iran, located 40 km offshore from Bahrain. A monastery with a church and nearby homes for married priests have also been excavated. The floral designs in the plaster decoration of the church suggested to the excavator a date in the fifth or sixth centuries AD. Later studies would seem to date the decorations to the end of the sixth century AD. Some Syriac inscriptions have been found at Kharg.

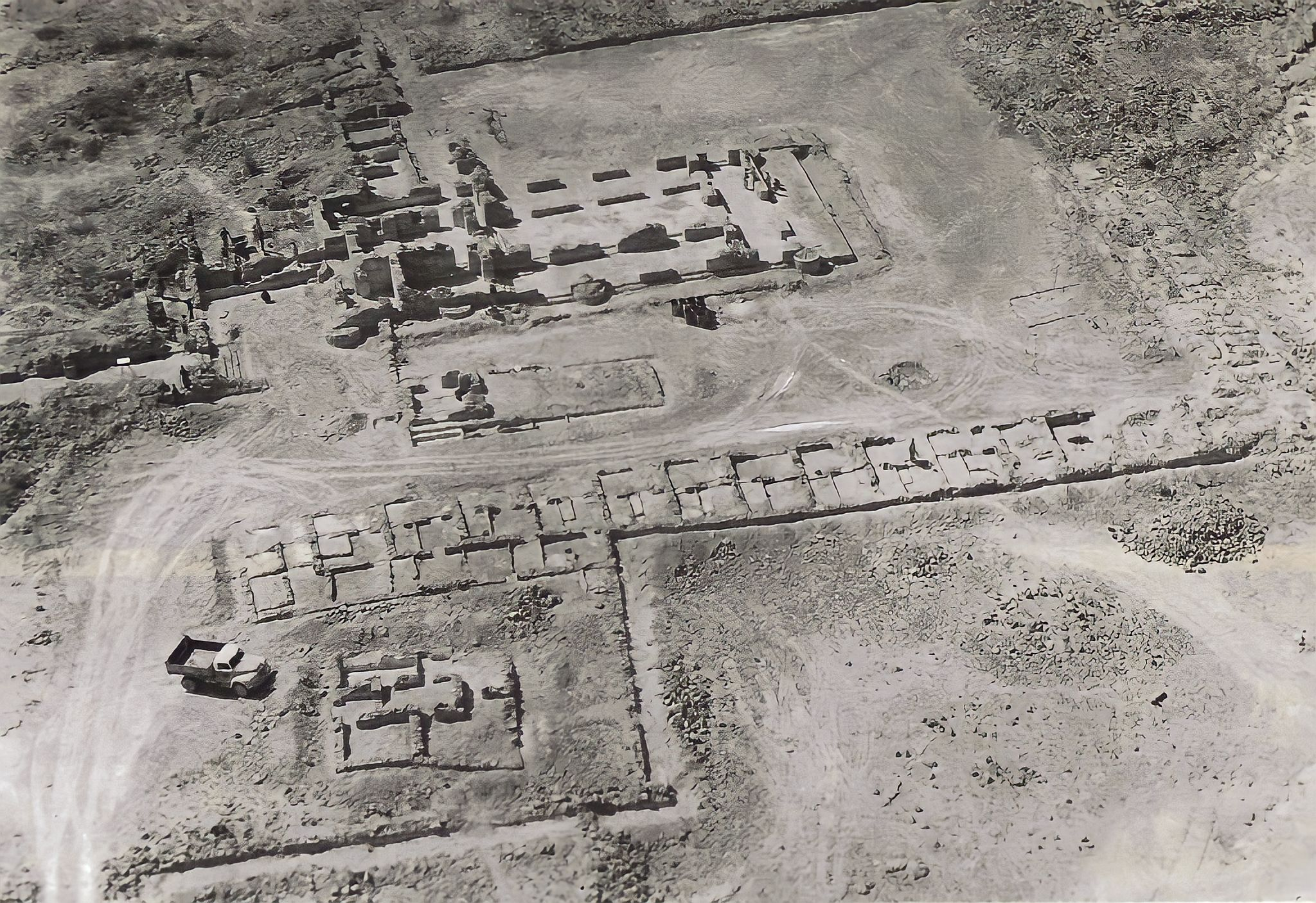
Remains of the Assyrian Church of the East monastery (fa) in Kharg Island.

==== Jubail and nearby areas ====
A church consisting of a walled courtyard and three rooms on the east side was found in 1986 in Jubail, the Gulf coast of Saudi Arabia. Initially dated to the fourth century, its dating has been moved to the mid-seventh, although this dating is not yet universally accepted. Cross designs were seen to have been impressed into the plaster flanking the doors of the structure. The reporter of the site did not indicate a clear date for it, but suggested that it must have been in existence for two centuries before the advent of Islam. Christian gravestones were also found at the site. At Thaj, 90 km to the west, what appears to be a smaller church or chapel, built of reused stones and perhaps dating to the fifth or sixth century, has been discovered. 10 km northeast of Thaj, at al-Hinnah, there is evidence of a Christian cemetery of ancient but unknown date. A church was identified in the island of Abu 'Ali near Jubail.

==== Jabal Berri ====
Not far to the South of Jubail, at Jabal Berri, three bronze crosses have been found dating possibly to the period when Sassanian Persia had influence over the region. Ruins of a nearby settlement suggests that a Christian community may have resided in the area.

==== Muharraq ====
Old foundations of a Nestorian monastery were discovered in Samaheej, a village in Muharraq, Bahrain. Another village in Muharraq, known as Al Dair, may have facilitated a monastery, as its name translates 'cloister' or 'monastery' in Aramaic.

==== Qasr Al Malehat ====
A site on the south-east coast of Qatar, near Al Wakrah, revealed the remnants of a structure purported to be a church. It was built directly on limestone bedrock and a hearth was found inside the ruins. Radiocarbon dating indicates the site was occupied in the early 7th century, and potsherds recovered from the surrounding area evidences continued occupation until the mid to late 8th century. The ceramics are consistent with those found in other Nestorian sites in the Eastern Arabia and the structure bears resemblance to the excavated church in Jubail.

==== Umm Al Maradim ====
An excavation carried out in 2013 uncovered a Nestorian cross in Umm Al Maradim, a site in central Qatar. The cross is made of hard stone and measures between 3 and 4 cm. A number of hearths and potsherds were found at the site, though no structures were discovered.

==== Umm Al Quwain ====
In 2022, archeologists announced the find of a monastery in Siniyah Island, off of the coast of Umm Al Quwain in the United Arab Emirates. The ruins include a monastery for prayers, a kitchen, store rooms, and living quarters for a bishop or abbot. There is a large cistern, possibly used for baptisms, and a chalices were found onside, which may have been used for communion.

==== Sir Bani Yas ====
At Sir Bani Yas, an island off the Western coast of the United Arab Emirates, an extensive monastic and ecclesiastical complex has been found similar to that at Kharg. It is considered one of the most extensive monasteries in Eastern Arabia. Excavations took place between 1993 and 1996. The Sir Bani Yas church building itself was about 14 m × 4.5 m. As with other sites in the region, plaster crosses were excavated. The excavator suggests a date in the sixth or seventh century for the construction of the church. The monastery contains decorative motifs that resemble ones known from Al-Hira in Iraq.

== West Arabia ==
Western Arabia is not mentioned in typical Christian sources, leading some to question a Christian presence in the region. However, sitting between two regions with major Christian populations (to the north, the Transjordan, and to the south, Himyar), and given the mobility of Arab troops, tribes, and elites, it is highly likely that Christians passed through the area.

The Tiran Island, an island part of modern-day Saudi Arabia, located between the Arabian Peninsula and the Sinai Peninsula, has a well-attested Christian population, including a bishop as early as the mid-fifth century, participating in church councils in the fifth and sixth centuries. In the early sixth century, Procopius attests that it became Byzantine territory, during the reign of the emperor Justinian I.

The Ghassanids, the pre-eminent Christian Arab tribal confederation of the time, may have projected a political presence in western Arabia. This could have involved alliances with tribes in Medina and a desire to gain a foothold in Mecca. A Christian presence has been established from pre-Islamic Hejazi inscriptions, which are now known from seven locations across Saudi Arabia as of 2025. A dozen Greek Christian inscriptions, ornate with Christian symbolism, names, and language, were found just northwest of Hegra. A text at Hegra names two men called "Samuel", citizens of Hegra and Tayma, who were Christian or Jewish. One was found in southern Saudi, at Barqā al-Shāʿ. A monastery was found in Kilwa, northeast of Tabuk, possibly run by Syrian Christians.

Areas like Mecca and Medina have not been excavated making it difficult to assess the pre-Islamic religious scene using material evidence. However, inscriptions nearby both Mecca (e.g., Ri al-Zallalah inscription) and Medina (e.g., FaS 7) have been found that use biblical language and expressions, reflecting a culture said to be "deeply impacted" by Christianity. One of the inscriptions was written by a man identified in Islamic tradition as the son of a Medinan Christian convert, suggesting he too was Christian.

Some historians have argued that the Quran provides more evidence for a substantial Christian presence in the Hejaz at the time of Muhammad and that it is our best source for Christian demography in Arabia at the time of Muhammad. The Quran mentions Christian groups and their beliefs, mentions and criticizes Christian institutions and their clergy (monasteries, priests, and overseers) especially monks and monasticism (Quran 5:63; 9:34; 22:40; 24:37-38; 57:27), leading some scholars to conclude that "Muhammad knew of priests, churches, monks, monastic cells, liturgies, and monasteries". The Quran's engagement with Christianity is not limited to isolated references to Jesus or Mary, but also includes New Testament turns of phrase, Christian legends such as the Companions of the Cave, and passages that appear to stage direct debate with Jews and Christians. Gabriel Said Reynolds argues that these features are better explained by an Arabic-speaking environment familiar with Christian stories, liturgy, institutions, and theological argument than by occasional contact with distant Christians.

In the early Islamic period, Anastasius of Sinai reportedly knew of Christians in Mecca.

A source from the thirteenth century AD, probably unreliable, describes an active metropolitan bishop of the Church of the East based in Medina and a bishop in Souk Okaz near Mecca.

=== Islamic tradition ===
Generally, Islamic tradition does not recognize the Christian history in Arabia, Western Arabia (the Hejaz) in particular. (Note: One source, the Book of the Towers by Amr ibn Matta, offers an explanation for this: "There was no one who preached about the Messiah in the country of Tihāma and the Ḥijāz because the apostles stopped at Najrān and went no further. They were preoccupied with the kings of Kinda and the princes of Yemen.") Historians look at Islamic reports about pre-Islamic religion with suspicion, given that they often conflict with contemporary archaeological data when it is available. For example, Udhruh in southern Jordan is described as having been a Jewish site around 630 by Ibn Sa'd, but archaeological data has only found evidence of Christianity. Sometimes, geographic definitions of the Hejaz were restricted to exclude Christian areas.

Despite the general trend in Islamic tradition, there were exceptions. For example, Al-Ya'qubi reported that multiple individuals among the Quraysh in Mecca converted to Christianity, as well as some entire tribes elsewhere in Arabia:

The Arab tribes that became Christian included some of the Quraysh, from the Banū Asad b. ʿAbd al‐ʿUzzā, one of whom was ʿUthmān b. al‐Ḥuwayrith b. Asad b. ʿAbd al‐ʿUzzā and another of whom was Waraqa b. Nawfal b. Asad. From the Banū Tamīm there were the Banū Imruʾ al‐Qays b. Zayd Manāt. From the Rabīʿa there were the Banū Taghlib. From the Yemen [that is, Yaman, the ‘southern’ Arab tribes, most of whom did not live in Yemen] there were the Ṭayyiʾ, Madhḥij, Bahrāʾ, Salīḥ, Tanūkh, Ghassān, and Lakhm.

Many other scattered reports of this nature existed, of converts to Christianity in Mecca and Medina. One example concerned a certain ‘Uthman b. al-Huwayrith, who travelled from Mecca to Roman lands, converted to Christianity, and then returned, trying to convince the Meccans to submit to Roman rule and to convert alongside him. Another figure, Ubayd Allah ibn Jahsh, a cousin of Muhammad, is said to have converted to Islam first, and later, converted from Islam to Christianity in Ethiopia. Another prominent Meccan, Al-Rabbab b. al-Baraʾ, abandoned his practice as a soothsayer (kāhin) to become a Christian. More well-known are the ascetics and monks that Muhammad knew like Bahira, Waraqah ibn Nawfal, and Quss Ibn Sa'ida al-Iyadi. Medinan converts included Abu ʿAmir al-Rāhib, who debated with local monks and the People of the Book and often travelled to Byzantine lands; Abu Qays, who practiced monasticism, but eventually converted to Islam; the two sons of Ansari Abu al-Husayn; and Wazr b. Sudus b. Jabir, who died a Christian. Reports also exist of Sayma al-Balqawi, a clergyman-merchant who traded with Medinans; Sayfi b. al-Aslat, a respected Christian poet of the Banu Aws; and multiple traditions of Muhammad sending out some of his followers to convert various Medinan Christians. The sense of these reports is that these were first-generation converts before enough time allowed a proper Christian community to form in Mecca and Medina. Ṣirma ibn Abī Anas, a Medinan poet, not said to have converted to Christianity himself, says in his verses that he spent time serving God in a church, using the Arabic word bīʿa, borrowed from Syriac biʿthā or Sabaic bʿt.

According to Irfan Shahid, a significant enough number of references in Islamic sources could support a degree of Christianization of Mecca, a monastic presence in the Hejaz more broadly, and a conversion of some Arab tribes with a presence in the Hejaz to Christianity. Shahid observes that Umayyad poetry attests monks and monasteries at Midian and Wadi al-Qura, especially in the verses of the poet Kuthayyir who speaks of the "monks of Madyan" and that of Ja'far ibn Suraqa, addressing Jamil ibn Ma'mar, mentioning the "monks in the lower part of Wadi al-Qura". Furthermore, places with Christian names in or near Mecca are named, like the "cemetery of the Christians" (maqbarat al-Naṣārā), a complex of mosques that were originally churches called "the oratories of Mary" (masājid Maryam) and "the station of the Christian" (mawqif al-Naṣrānī). Muhammad is reported to have interacted with Christian ascetics, monks, and bishops, like Bahira, Waraqa, and Quss. Shahid shows that tradition often mentions Ethiopians in the biography of Muhammad. Combined with the conversion of Ethiopia's Kingdom of Aksum to Christianity in the fourth century, Shahid deduces that these historical personages were likely Christian. Many Ethiopic loanwords appear in the Quran. Furthermore, Shahid notes that the Banu Udhra, a nomadic tribe in the Wadi al-Qura region, converted to Christianity in the pre-Islamic period, and some of its members seem to have remained Christian in early Islamic times.

6th century Byzantine mosaic of the enthroned Theotokos on the north wall of the Basilica of Sant'Apollinare Nuovo

Some Islamic sources say that the Kaaba housed icons of Mary, the mother of Jesus. Al-Azraqi mentions such a report through an isnad going back to Ata ibn Abi Rabah:

I have heard that there was set up in al-Bayt (the Kaaba) a picture (timthāl) of Maryam and ʿIsa. ['Ata'] said: "Yes, there was set in it a picture of Maryam adorned (muzawwaqan); in her lap, her son ʿIsa sat adorned."

The description implies that Jesus was seated in Mary's lap, implying that it depicted the Christ Child, or Jesus when he was a baby. Jesus being seated in her lap also suggests Mary was in a seated position. This description therefore corresponds to widespread Christian imagery and iconography of the child Jesus being seated in the lap of the Virgin Mary.

== Central Arabia ==
According to Amr ibn Matta in his fourteenth century work the Book of the Towers, Christian missionaries into Arabia were "preoccupied with the kings of Kinda and the princes of Yemen". The time that Christianity reached Central Arabia is not clear, but in the early sixth century, the Kingdom of Kinda, the major Arabian polity of the region, seems to have converted to Christianity, as attested by the Dayr Hind inscription.

Christianity is particularly attested in Al-Yamama, where sources describe Haudha ibn Ali, the influential chief of the Banu Hanifa tribe, as a Christian. Additional groups in Al-Yamama described as Christian in tradition include Hanifa ibn Lukain and the Bakr ibn Wa'il.

The final attestation of a Christian presence in the region is from the Islamic era, in the early ninth-century, during the reign of al-Ma'mun (r. 813–833), where a dialogue is recorded with a Central Arabian Christian who offers an argument for his faith.

== Architecture ==
=== Churches ===
In South Arabia, according to the Philostorgius (d. 439), Constantius II sent the bishop Theophilus the Indian on a missionary effort to South Arabia in the mid-4th century AD. While he did not convert the ruler, Tharan Yuhanim, he was said to have succeeded in building three churches in Zafar (the capital), Aden, and Qani'. However, archaeological evidence for Christianity in South Arabia is absent before the late fifth century. The next time churches are mentioned in the region, is from local inscriptions, describing several being burned (including at Zafar, Mokha, and Najran) during the persecution of Himyarite Christians by the king Dhu Nuwas in the early 520s. The massacre of the Christians of Najran resulted in an invasion of Himyar by the nearby Kingdom of Aksum, ruled by Ethiopian Christians. The invasion was a success, and resulted in Christian rulers being installed over the region. The first of these, Kaleb of Axum, built three churches in Zafar. His successor, Abraha, built and consecrated numerous churches, including in Marib and Hamer.

Irfan Shahid has used literary sources (the Book of the Himyarites, the Martyrdom of Arethas, and the Life of Saint Gregentios), establish a tentative ecclesiastical map across South Arabia based on comments and lists that Shahid believes can be reliably accepted. Shahid points to a comment in the Book which indicates that there were many churches, widely dispersed in the area, beginning in the time of Kaleb of Aksum, when a new phase of Christian architecture was introduced into the region: the king "built many churches in the land, and appointed in them priests from those who were with him...and left notables of the Abyssinians to guard...also the churches that he had built". In the Vita, three churches are named at Zafar, the capital of Himyar: the Great Church of the Holy Trinity; the Church of the Holy Mother of God; and the Church of the Holy Apostles. Shahid has argued that one of these Zafar churches may have survived from the fourth until sixth centuries. Three churches are named for Najran: the Church of Our Lord Jesus Christ of the Life-giving Resurrection, the Church of the Holy Mother of God, and the Church of the Holy Martyrs and the Glorious Arethas. Of these, the Church of the Resurrection is likely to have been the principal church of Najran, because it is linked to an extensive ecclesiastical hierarchy including archprebysters, archdeacons, and archsubdeacons. Three are named at Qana', the main seaport of South Arabia: the Church of the Ascension; the Church of John, the Forerunner; and the Church of the Apostle Thomas. All of these churches are said to have been built by Kaleb. The number of churches, three in each of South Arabia's Christian centers and nine in all, may reflect a pattern in Kaleb's energetic efforts to ensure the Christianization of the kingdom.

Multiple churches are mentioned in the Eastern Arabian or Gulf region, including the Jubail Church, and churches in Thaj and Failaka Island. The Jubail Church had a rectangular plan about 15–20 m^{2} and a chancel with pastophoria. Round supports on the wide walls probably helped carry a vault. The only decoration still visible are vine scrolls at the springing of the vault and crosses engraved into the pillars of the chancel area. The church at the Failaka Island was modelled off of church architecture from Mesopotamia, The building is 35 x 9 m, with a narthex, a wide central nave, and side aisles only connected to the nave through narrow arcades. The vaulted chancel was enclosed by a blank wall.

Islamic tradition attributes to the Medinan poet Ṣirma ibn Abī Anas, albeit not a Christian himself, verses about him spending time serving God in a "church", using the Arabic word bīʿa, borrowed from Syriac biʿthā or Sabaic bʿt.

=== Cathedrals, monasteries, and monasticism ===
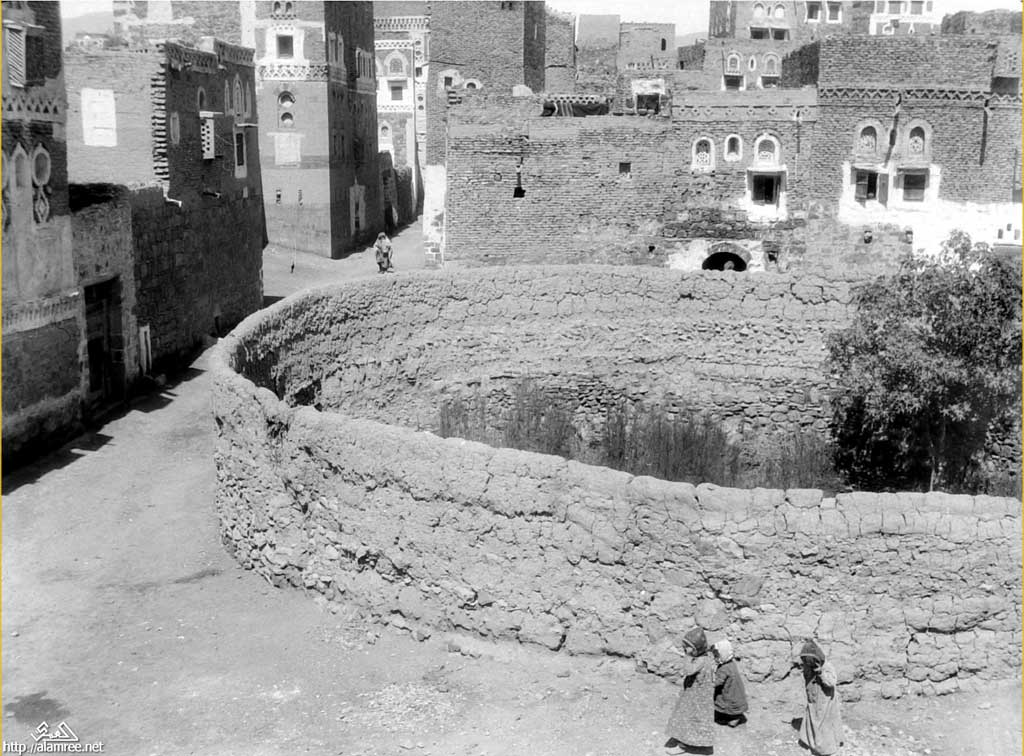
Remains of the Al-Qalis Church in 1942

Monasteries were centers of Christian scholarship, intellectual activity, and theology.

In Eastern Arabia, four monasteries have been archaeologically discovered, including the Church of the East monastery on Sir Bani Yas. They are also recorded, in inscriptions and literature, in South Arabia. Since many bishoprics are known across Eastern Arabia, it is likely that other monasteries, churches, and cathedrals also once existed.

In northwestern Arabia, in the Hejaz, a monastery has been found at Kilwa. Umayyad poetry directly attests to a presence of monasteries at both Midian and Wadi al-Qura; the poet Kuthayyir speaks of the "monks of Madyan" and another, an obscure figure named Ja'far ibn Suraqa, speaking to the more famous poet Jamil ibn Ma'mar, talks of the "monks in the lower part of Wadi al-Qura". A source from the thirteenth century AD, probably unreliable, describes an active metropolitan bishop of the Church of the East based in Medina.

Syriac Christian churches may have trained and helped run these monasteries. The practice of monasticism is criticized regularly in the Quran.

A convent in Al-Hira was founded by the Christian Princess Hind, who was married to the Lakhmid ruler, al-Mundhir III.

The famous Al-Qalis Church was a cathedral built by Abraha at Sanaa, now the capital city of Yemen, best known from Al-Azraqi's writings about it. It was built over an earlier pagan sanctuary, and eventually become a part of the modern Great Mosque of Sanaa. The bones of Christian martyrs from Najran or Zafar were placed into it. According to Islamic tradition, this was a part Abraha's efforts to turning Al-Qalis into a major Christian pilgrimage site.

Some place names at the island of Socotra, an island south of Yemen, have been suggested to be related to the Greek word for "cathedral". A church has also been discovered at the site, datable to the 7th–10th centuries.

=== Kaaba of Najran ===
At the center of pilgrimage in the city of Najran was the Kaaba of Najran, first mentioned in pre-Islamic poetry attributed to Al-A'sha. Some have suggested that it was the same building as the Martyrium of Arethas mentioned in literary sources. The Kaaba was built by the Harith ibn Ka'b clan. It was a qubba (domed building), enclosed by the river Nuhairdan. According to Yaqut al-Hamawi, feasts were celebrated outside of the Kaaba's walls with singing, flowers, and drinking. Bakri says that the Kaaba was rectangular and accessible by a staircase. Ibn al-Kalbi says it was surmounted by a dome made of hides, whose construction may be analogous to the dome of Debre Dammo in Ethiopia. The dome is painted with the figures of saints gazing down from the heavens. The walls are covered with mosaics and the ceiling with gold, indicating a gilded coffered ceiling. The facade of the church is said to have been clad with marble panels like in the famous Ghumdan Palace in Sanaa.

=== Cemeteries ===
A large Christian cemetery has been found at al-Hinna and in Hima. According to Islamic tradition, there was a "cemetery of the Christians" (maqbarat al-Naṣārā) at or near Mecca.

== Bishops and priests ==
Offices of bishops were established across the Arabian Peninsula between the third and sixth centuries, including in the province of Roman Arabia as early as the third century, across Eastern Arabia by the fifth century, and across multiple major cities in South Arabia by the late fifth and the sixth century.

Byzantine Christians made special recognition of the bishops of the Arab peoples and an emphasis on reaching out to them to bring them into the religion. Bishops to the Arabs were called "bishops of the parembolai" in Greek, and "bishops of the ʿammē" in Syriac (equivalent to umam in Arabic, meaning "nations"). Theodoret of Cyrrhus urged Christians to learn the languages of these peoples in order to share Christianity with them.

== Pre-Islamic poetry ==
Historians debate how common Christianity was among the pre-Islamic poets. Adi ibn Zayd is the best known Christian poet of the sixth century. Al-Nabigha wrote monotheistic verses and recited poetry in the court of the (Christian) Ghassanids, praising them as pious Christians and likening their leadership to that of Solomon. He also exhorted the Kaaba pilgrimage.

== Liturgical languages ==
The Syriac language was one of the main languages used to connect Byzantine with Arab Christians. For example, the Letter of the Archimandrites of Arabia is a Syriac document, dated to 570 AD, that was signed by 137 monks from the province of Roman Arabia, a place where many pre-Islamic Arabic inscriptions have been found. Syriac Christians used a special term, "bishops of the ʿammē" (nations), for bishops sent out to, and among, the Arab peoples. Syriac Christian populations lived in Beth Qatraye, a region covering large swathes of Eastern Arabia. Dioceses are documented in this area by the early fifth century, and the area gave rise to four bishoprics (episcopal sees). Bishops from Beth Qatraye participated in international church councils in Mesopotamia from this period until the late seventh century, according to the records preserved in the Synodicon Orientale. In the seventh century, many of the significant Syriac authors in the Near East are known to have originated from Beth Qatraye. While the spoken language in Beth Qatraye was a local vernacular known as Qatrayith, the written and liturgical language used was Syriac.

Many major figures of the Syriac Miaphysite Church, including Jacob of Serugh, Philoxenus of Mabbug, and Simeon of Beth Arsham, acted as diplomats with communities of Arab Christians, and sent letters, in Syriac, to these communities, such as Jacob's Letter to the Himyarites. Simeon of Beth Arsham also wrote a letter on the persecution of Christian community of Najran, his Letter on the Himyarite Martyrs, which he wrote after travelling to the city personally to interview its residents. During his lifetime, Philoxenus appointed two bishops over Najran and also counselled the major Lakhmid geeral Abu Ya'fur ibn Alqama over the major theological controversies of their time, including on questions related to the baptism of heretics and the nature of Christ. Severus of Antioch, the head of the Syriac Orthodox Church, sent missionary bishops to Al-Mundhir III ibn al-Harith, the king of the Ghassanids, to convert him into the Miaphysite faith. Later, Al-Harith ibn Jabalah, the Ghassanid king until 569 AD, played a leading role in helping elect a member of the Miaphysite Church to the position of the bishop of Antioch.

The Syriac language was also used for the Christian communities of South Arabia, especially the oasis of Najran. Liturgical Syriac Christian inscriptions have been found near Najran from the sixth and seventh centuries, and some Najranite clerics were trained in Syriac monasteries. The massacre of Najran's Christian community sparked outrage across the Syriac-speaking world, with numerous Syriac letters written about the events. This massacre triggered a series of events, leading to an invasion by the nearby Christian Ethiopian kingdom. Abraha, one of the Christian rulers of South Arabia at this time, oriented the region's churches away from the Ethiopian sphere and into the Syriac sphere of influence.

== Sects and heresies ==
In earlier scholarship, it was believed that Arabia had become a refuge of heretical Christian groups that were not positively received in the rest of the Christian world. One of the main arguments cited for this has been that it would explain the unconventional Christian beliefs described by the Quran, the founding scripture of Islam that engaged with Christianity in an Arabian environment. However, in recent years, historians have moved away from this view. The Quran is no longer read as supporting the existence of Christians with heretical beliefs in Arabia, but instead, its uncharacteristic description of Christian doctrines has been understood to be a product of the rhetoric used by the Quran in its discourse and debate with Christians.

The Arabs may have had occasional contact with heretical varieties of Christianity. Constantius II (r. 337–361 AD), an Arian emperor, is said to have sent missions into South Arabia. Another Arian emperor, Valens (r. 364–378), wanted the Syrian-Arab queen, Mawiyya, of the Tanukhid tribal confederation, to appoint an Arian when she was making the choice for selecting a bishop for her people. However, Mawiyya refused, leading to a revolt where Valens' forces were repeatedly defeated. Mawiyya, successful, appointed a bishop of her own choosing, and married her daughter to a Roman man who adhered to the Nicene Creed, reinforcing her allegiance to the Nicene church.

C. John Block has argued that the dominant variety of Christianity in South Arabia was Monophysitism, with a possible Nestorian minority, and virtually no Chalcedonians.

Nestorian communities lived in Najran, Beth Qatraye, Beth Mazunaye, and Socotra. The Mesopotamian city Al-Hira is likely played a significant role in introducing Nestorianism into these regions.

== Contact with Christians outside of Arabia ==
The Roman Near East had strong connections with South Arabia, attested by the many bishops sent on missions to, or to be consecrated in, the region, according to contemporary Christian sources.

Many major cities in the eastern regions of the Roman Empire, north of the Arabian Peninsula, were multilingual (bilingual or trilingual), with Arabic being one of the major spoken languages. Al-Hira, the Lakhmid capital, was a meeting point between speakers of Arabic, Syriac, and Persian. Al-Hira also controlled trans-Arabian commerce crossing from Mesopotamia into southern Arabia. Another city, Petra, is also noted as a site of Aramaic-Arabic bilingualism. Of the three Paleo-Arabic inscriptions known from pre-Islamic, southern Syria, two out of three, the Zabad and Harran inscriptions, are multi-lingual with a corresponding Greek text.

== After Islam ==
Some Islamic traditions promote the idea of the expulsion of all Christians and Jews from the Arabian Peninsula, but opinions varied. Historically, Christianity did not immediately end as a practiced religion after the rise of Islam and the early Muslim conquests, which first extended the first Islamic state in Medina to the entire Arabian Peninsula.

Christians in Eastern Arabia and Oman flourished in the seventh century with the region still producing prominent Christian intellectuals like Isaac of Qatar. Eastern Arabia's Christian community survived into the first half of the eighth century, but afterwards, significantly declined: distinct signs of Islamic governance appear in the early eighth century and forced conversions begin in its second half.

According to Islamic tradition, East Arabia was swiftly conquered by Al-Ala ibn al-Hadrami. After this had taken place, the local Christians, Jews, and Zoroastrians were given the option to convert to Islam or to pay the poll tax (jizya). In Oman, the pre-Islamic bishopric is documented to have participated in an international Christian synod in the year 676 AD, implying its continued existence at that time.

Christian sources from the 630s to 650s, primarily the letters of Ishoyahb III, the Patriarch of the Church of the East from 649 to 659, view the early conquerors as liberators from Persian rule, as praising Christianity, and even supporting the Church of the East, with Ishoyahb writing: "Not only are they not opponents of Christianity, but they even praise our faith and honor the priests and holy ones of our Lord and give assistance to the churches and monasteries". Nevertheless, while not being forced to convert, Ishoyahb complains that the economic pressure of the poll tax was leading to the apostasy of "the people of Mazon" (Mazon being the name of a southeast Arabian province roughly equivalent to modern-day Oman). Ishoyahb complained that the Christian community there was acting independently of the church of Seleucia-Ctesiphon. His successor, Giwargis I, a Patriarch of the Church of the East from 661 to 680, travelled from Beth Aramaye in Iraq to Beth Qatraye to participate in a local synod at the island of Dayrin (modern-day Muharraq Island), and is said to have succeeded in the reconciliation effort. In the late seventh century, caliphs Mu'awiya I and Yazid I were both seen as benevolent rulers by Christians, and through the seventh century, boundaries between being Christian and being Muslim were fuzzy, with members from both practices being willing to participate in the rituals and places of worship of one another. This picture is supported by material evidence, with multiple discovered monasteries in Eastern Arabia being radiocarbon dates to the seventh to ninth centuries; in this region, churches and monasteries were allowed to be repaired, reconstructed, and built from scratch. A seventh-eighth century Christian monastery has also been found in Kilwa, in northern Saudi Arabia, with Anastasius of Sinai (d. ~700) writing about Christians in Mecca. Christianity also survived in the south, especially in Najran. The Christian population of Najran may have survived until the 13th century, with reports of their expulsion by the caliph Umar being fictional.

== See also ==
- Judaism in pre-Islamic Arabia
- Paleo-Arabic

== Bibliography ==
- Arbach, Mounir (2022). "Le christianisme en Arabie avant l'Islam". Bulletin des Chrétiens d'Orient: 17–26.
- Bernard, Vincent; Salles, Jean-François (1991). "Discovery of a Christian church at al-Qusur, Failaka (Kuwait)". Proceedings of the Seminar for Arabian Studies. 21: 7–21.
- Block, C. John (2011). "Philoponian Monophysitism in South Arabia at the Advent of Islam with Implications for the English Translation of 'thalātha'in Qurʾān 4. 171 and 5. 73" (PDF). Journal of Islamic Studies. 23 (1): 50–75.
- Bonneric, Julie (2020). "The Early Islamic Pottery from the Monastery at al-Qusur". Journal of Islamic Archaeology. 7: 21–38.
- Bonneric, Julie (2021). "Archaeological Evidence of an Early Islamic Monasteryin the Centre of al‐Qusur (Failaka Island, Kuwait)". Arabian Archaeology and Epigraphy. 32: 50–61.
- Brock, Sebastian (1999). "Syriac Writers from Beth Qatraye". ARAM. 11 (1): 85–96.
- Calvet, Yves (1998). "Monuments paléochrétiens à Koweit et dans la région du Golfe". Orientalia Christiana Analecta. 256: 671–699.
- Carter, Robert (2008). "Christianity in the Gulf during the first centuries of Islam". Arabian Archaeology and Epigraphy. 19 (1): 71–108.
- Carter, Robert (2013). "Christianity in the Gulf after the coming of Islam:redating the churches and monasteries of Bet Qatraye". In Robin, C.J.; Schiettecatte, J. (eds.). Les préludesde l'Islam. Ruptures et continuités des civilisations du Proche‐Orient, del'Afrique orientale, de l'Arabie et de l'Inde à la veille de l'Islam. De Boccard. pp. 311–330.
- Chatonnet, Francoise Briquel; Debie, Muriel (2023). The Syriac World: In Search of a Forgotten Christianity. Yale University Press.
- Davitashvili, Ana (2026). "Introduction". In Davitashvili, Ana (ed.). The Qurʾan and Syriac Christianity: Recurring Themes and Motifs. Brill. pp. 1–32.
- Debie, Muriel (2024). "The Arabs and Northern Languages and Scripts before Islam". In Vacca, Alison; Borrut, Antoine; Ceballos, Manuela (eds.). Navigating Language in the Early Islamic World: Multilingualism and Language Change in the First Centuries of Islam. Brepols. pp. 195–257.
- Dye, Guillaume (2021). "Mapping the Sources of the Qur'anic Jesus". In Mortensen, Mette Bjerregaard; Dye, Guillaume; Oliver, Isaac W.; Tesei, Tommaso (eds.). The Study of Islamic Origins: New Perspectives and Contexts. De Gruyter.
- Dziekan, Marek M. (2012). "Quss Ibn Sa'ida al-Iyadi (6th–7th Cent. A.D.), Bishop of Najran An Arabic and Islamic Cultural Hero Authors". Studia Ceranea. 2: 127–135. doi:10.18778/2084-140X.02.11. hdl:11089/4269.
- Elders, Joseph (2001). "The lost churches of the Arabian Gulf: recent discoveries on the islands of Sir Bani Yas and Marawah, Abu Dhabi Emirate, United Arab Emirates". Proceedings of the Seminar for Arabian Studies. 31: 47–57.
- Fares, Saba (2010). "L'inscription arabe de Kilwa: nouvelle lecture". Semitica et Classica. 3: 241–248.
- Fares, Saba (2011). "Christian monasticism on the eve of Islam: Kilwa (Saudi Arabia) — new evidence" (PDF). Arabian Archaeology and Epigraphy. 22 (2): 243–252.
- Finster, Barbara (2010). "Arabia in Late Antiquity: An Outline of the Cultural Situation in the Peninsula at the Time of Muhammad" (PDF). In Neuwirth, Angelika; Sinai, Nicolai; Marx, Michael (eds.). The Qur'an in Context. Historical and Literary Investigations into the Qur'anic Milieu. Brill. pp. 61–114.
- Finster, Barbara (2017). "The Material Culture of Pre‐ and Early Islamic Arabia". In Flood, Finbarr Barry; Necipoğlu, Gülru (eds.). A Companion to Islamic Art and Architecture. John Wiley & Sons. pp. 61–88.
- Fisher, Greg (2011). Between Empires: Arabs, Romans, and Sasanians in Late Antiquity. Oxford University Press.
- Fisher, Greg; Wood, Philip (2015). "Arabs and Christianity". In Fisher, Greg (ed.). Arabs and Empires before Islam. Oxford University Press. pp. 276–372.
- Fisher, Greg (2019). Rome, Persia, and Arabia: Shaping the Middle East from Pompey to Muhammad. Taylor & Francis.
- Forness, Michael (2019). Preaching Christology in the Roman Near East: A Study of Jacob of Serugh. Oxford University Press.
- Gatier, Pierre-Louis (2020). "Les graffites grecs de Mabrak an-Naqah (Arabie Saoudite)". Cahiers du Centre Gustave Glotz. 31: 105–134.
- Grasso, Valentina (2023). Pre-Islamic Arabia: Societies, Politics, Cults and Identities During Late Antiquity. Cambridge University Press.
- Hatke, George (2019). "The Other South Arabians: The Ancient South Arabian Kingdoms and MSA (Modern South Arabian) Neighbors, ca. 300 BCE-550 CE". In Hatke, George; Ruzicka, Ronald (eds.). Ancient South Arabia through History: Kingdoms, Tribes, and Traders. Cambridge Scholars Publishing. pp. 1–62.
- Hellyer, Peter (2001). "Nestorian Christianity in the Pre-Islamic UAE and Southern Arabia" (PDF). Journal of Social Affairs. 18: 79–99.
- Hoyland, Robert; Power, Timothy (2025). "Christian Monasticism in Late Antique and Early Islamic East Arabia". Arabian Archaeology and Epigraphy.
- Hussein, Ali (2008). "Towards a Literary and Historical study of the Old Qaṣīda in al-Yamāma: The Qaṣīdas of the Qays b. Tha'laba Tribe". Mélanges de l'Université Saint-Joseph. 61: 33–99.
- King, G.R.D. (1997). "A Nestorian Monastic Settlement on the Island of Ṣīr Banī Yās, Abu Dhabi: A Preliminary Report". Bulletin of the School of Oriental and African Studies: 221–235.
- Kozah, Mario; Abu-Husayn, Abdulrahim; Al-Murikhi, Saif Shaheen; Al-Thani, Haya, eds. (2014). The Syriac writers of Qatar in the seventh century. Gorgias Press.
- Kozah, Mario; Abu-Husayn, Abdulrahim; Al-Murikhi, Saif Shaheen; Al-Thani, Haya, eds. (2015). An Anthology of Syriac Writers from Qatar in the Seventh Century. Gorgias Press.
- Kozah, Mario (2024). "The Arabian Oryx or Unicorn in Qaṭrāyīth, the Ancient East Arabian Language of Beth Qatraye" (PDF). In Brand, Tylor; Orfali, Bilal (eds.). In the Steps of the Sultan: Essays in Honor of Abdulrahim Abu-Husayn. American University of Beirut Press. pp. 349–359.
- Lamport, Mark A. (2018). Encyclopedia of Christianity in the global south: Volume 2. Rowman & Littlefield.
- Langfeldt, John (1994). "Recently discovered early Christian monuments in Northeastern Arabia". Arabian Archaeology and Epigraphy. 5 (1): 32–60.
- Lecker, Michael (2015). "Were the Ghassānids and the Byzantines behind Muḥammad's hijra?". In Genequand, Denis; Robin, Christian Julien (eds.). Les Jafnides, des rois arabes au service de Byzance (VIe siècle de l'ère chrétienne). De Boccard. pp. 268–286.
- Lindstedt, Ilkka (2023). Muhammad and His Followers in Context: The Religious Map of Late Antique Arabia. Brill.
- Lindstedt, Ilkka (2025). "The Issue of Pre‐Islamic Arabic Christian Poetry Revisited". Arabian Archaeology and Epigraphy: 1–12.
- Lindstedt, Ilkka (2025b). "A Map and List of the Monotheistic Inscriptions of Arabia, 400–600 CE". Hadis ve Siyer Araştırmaları. 10 (2): 275–283.
- Lindstedt, Ilkka (2026). "The Religious Groups of Mecca and Medina in the Sixth and Seventh Centuries CE". Abdou Filali-Ansary Occasional Paper Series. 11: 1–31.
- MacDonald, Michael (2015). "Arabs and Empires before the Sixth Century". In Fisher, Greg (ed.). Arabs and Empires before Islam. Oxford University Press. pp. 11–89.
- Millar, Fergus (2009). "Christian Monasticism in Roman Arabia at the Birth of Mahomet". Semitica et Classica. 2: 97–115. doi:10.1484/J.SEC.1.100512.
- Mourad, Suleiman (2014). "Christianity in Arabia: An Overview (4th–9th Centuries CE)". In Kozah, Mario; Abu-Husayn, Abdulrahim; Al-Murikhi, Saif Shaheen; Al Thani, Haya (eds.). The Syriac Writers of Qatar in the Seventh Century. Gorgias Press. pp. 37–60.
- Munt, Harry (2015a). "Arabic and Persian Sources for Pre-Islamic Arabia". In Fisher, Greg (ed.). Arabs and Empires before Islam. Oxford University Press. pp. 437–500.
- Munt, Harry (2015b). ""No two religions": Non-Muslims in the early Islamic Ḥijāz". Bulletin of the School of Oriental and African Studies. 78 (2): 249–269.
- Nebes, Norbert (2010). "The Martyrs of Najrān and the End of Ḥimyar: On the Political History of South Arabia in the Early Sixth Century". In Neuwirth, Angelika; Sinai, Nicolai; Marx, Michael (eds.). The Qur'an in Context. Historical and Literary Investigations into the Qur'anic Milieu. Brill. pp. 25–60.
- Nicosai, Mara (2020). "Christianity in the Gulf: Vestiges of the East Syrian Presence in Late Antiquity". In Coppini, Costanza; Simi, Francesca (eds.). Interactions and New Directions in Near Eastern Archaeology: Vol. 3, Proceedings of the 5th "Broadening Horizons" Conference (Udine 5–8 June 2017). Edizioni Università di Trieste. pp. 371–383.
- Osman, Ghada (2005). "Pre-Islamic Arab Converts to Christianity in Mecca and Medina: An Investigation into the Arabic Sources" (PDF). The Muslim World. 95 (1): 69–80.
- Parry, Kenneth; Hinnells, John R., eds. (2000). The Blackwell Dictionary of Eastern Christianity. Blackwell.
- Potts, Daniel (1994). "Nestorian Crosses from Jabal Berri". Arabian Archaeology and Epigraphy. 5 (1): 61–65.
- Power, T.; Esposti, M.D.; Hoyland, R.; Kannouma, R.H. (2023). "The Discovery of a Late Antique and Early Islamic Monastery on SiniyaIsland, Umm al‐Quwain". Advances in UAE Archaeology: Proceedingsof Abu Dhabi’s Archaeology Conference 2022. Archaeopress. pp. 307–330.
- Power, T.; Esposti, D.; Hoyland, R.; Kannouma, R.H. (2024). "Excavations at a Late Antique to Early Islamic Pearling Town and Monastery on Sīnīya Island, Umm al-Quwain". Proceedings of the Seminar for Arabian Studies. 53: 211–219.
- Reynolds, Gabriel Said (2019). "Biblical Turns of Phrase in the Quran" (PDF). In Elias, Jamal; Orfali, Bilal (eds.). Light upon Light: Essays in Islamic Thought and History in Honor of Gerhard Bowering. Brill. pp. 45–69.
- Reynolds, Gabriel Said (2025). Christianity and the Qur'an: The Rise of Islam in Christian Arabia. Yale University Press.
- Robin, Christian Julien (2010). "Nagrān vers l'époque du massacre : notes sur l'histoire politique, économique et institutionnelle et sur l'introduction du christianisme (avec un réexamen du Martyre d'Azqīr)". In Beaucamp, Joelle; Briquel-Chatonnet, Francoise; Robin, Christian Julien (eds.). Juifs Et Chretiens En Arabie Aux Ve Et Vie Siecles: Regards Croises Sur Les Sources. Peeters. pp. 39–106.
- Robin, Christian Julien (2012). "Les signes de la prophétie en Arabie à l'époque de Muḥammad (fin du vie et début du viie siècle de l'ère chrétienne)". La raison des signes: Présages, rites, destin dans les sociétés de la méditerranée ancienne. Brill.
- Robin, Christian Julien (2015), "Ḥimyar, Aksūm, and Arabia Deserta in Late Antiquity", Arabs and Empires before Islam, Oxford University Press, pp. 127–171, doi:10.1093/acprof:oso/9780199654529.003.0004, ISBN 978-0-19-965452-9
- Robin, Christian Julien (2019). "Les calendriers de l'Arabie préislamique". Jerusalem Studies in Arabic and Islam. 46: 1–65.
- Robin, Christian Julien (2020). "Allāh avant Muḥammad". Jerusalem Studies in Arabic and Islam. 49: 1–145.
- Roohi, Ehsan (2026). "The Purported Role of the Ghassānids and the Byzantines in Muhammad's Migration to Medina: A Reappraisal". Al-Masāq Journal of the Medieval Mediterranean: 1–24.
- Sinai, Nicolai (2024). "The Christian Elephant in the Meccan Room: Dye, Tesei, and Shoemaker on the Date of the Qurʾān". Journal of the International Qur'anic Studies Association. 9: 57–118. doi:10.1515/jiqsa-2023-0013.
- Shahid, Irfan (1979). "Byzantium in South Arabia". Dumbarton Oaks Papers. 33: 23–94.
- Shahid, Irfan (1989). Byzantium and the Arabs in the Fifth Century. Dumbarton Oaks.
- Shahid, Irfan (1993). "Nadjrān". In Bosworth, C.E.; Donzel, E. Van; Heinrichs, W.P.; Pellat, C.H. (eds.). The Encyclopedia of Islam: Volume 7: MIF-NAZ. Brill. pp. 871–872.
- Shahid, Irfan (1995). Byzantium and the Arabs in the Sixth Century, Volume 1, Part 2: Ecclesiastical History. Dumbarton Oaks.
- Shahid, Irfan (2002). Byzantium and the Arabs in the Sixth Century, Volume 2, Part 1, Toponymy, Monuments, Historical Geography, and Frontier Studies. Dumbarton Oaks.
- Shahid, Irfan (2004). "Arab Christianity Before the Rise of Islam". In Badr, Habib (ed.). Christianity: A History in the Middle East. Middle East Council of Churches. pp. 435–451.
- Shoemaker, Stephen (2018). "Jewish Christianity, Non-Trinitarianism and the Beginnings of Islam". In Mimouni, Simon (ed.). Judaïsme ancien et origines du christianisme. Brepols. pp. 105–116.
- Stetkevych, Suzanne Pinckney (2017). "Solomon and Mythic Kingship in the Arab-Islamic Tradition: Qaṣīdah, Qurʾān and Qiṣaṣ al-anbiyāʾ". Journal of Arabic Literature. 48: 1–37. doi:10.1163/1570064x-12341340.
- Talib, Adam (2013). "Topoi and Topography in the Histories of al-Ḥīra" (PDF). In Wood, Philip (ed.). History and Identity in the Late Antique Near East. Oxford University Press. pp. 123–147.
- Toft, Lasse Løvlund (2021). "Najrān in the Sīra: narrative roles and Muslim attitudes towards the South Arabian Christians". Semitica et Classica. 14: 179–198.
- Toft, Lasse Løvlund (2022). "Dhū Nuwās and the Martyrs of Najrān in Islamic Arabic Literature until 1400 AD". Muslim Perspectives on Jewish-Christian Relations. 13 (2).
- Toral-Niehoff, Isabel (2018). "Imperial Contests and the Arabs: The World of Late Antiquity on the Eve of Islam" (PDF). In Salvatore, Armando; Tottoli, Robert; Rahimi, Babak; M. Fariduddin, Attar; Patel, Naznin (eds.). The Wiley Blackwell History of Islam. Wiley-Blackwell. pp. 59–76.
- Wood, Philip (2023). "Christianity in the Arabian Peninsula and Possible Contexts for the Qurʾān" (PDF). In Dye, Guillaume (ed.). Early Islam: the sectarian milieu of late Antiquity?. Éditions de l'Université de Bruxelles. pp. 225–248.
