= Letter to the Himyarites =

6th century letter by Jacob of Serugh

The Letter to the Himyarites was a Syriac letter sent by Jacob of Serugh to the Christian community of Najran in South Arabia to console them during a period of persecution that they faced in the time of the reign of the Jewish monarch of Himyar, Dhu Nuwas. Jacob's letter came as one of many responses to the massacre, which was a moment of international outrage among Christian communities. Jacob's letter was meant to draw a wide and non-elite readership and may have been associated with the interest of the Miaphysite Church in the Arabian peninsula.

A Syriac edition of Jacob's letter was published by Gunnar Olinder in 1937. The letter is itemized and sometimes referred to as Letter 18.

== Structure ==
Jacob's letter was structured into five main sections:

- A salutation
- A consolation for the persecuted, reminding them of what Jesus Christ had also suffered
- An exposition of Christology (1/3 of the letter)
- A consolation for the persecuted, combined with eschatological hope
- A valediction

== Content ==
The opening salutation of the letter reads:

To the chosen athletes, the friends of true victory, the astonishing and the powerful, the servants of God, the truly faithful, our Christian brothers, and the tested confessors, in the city of Najran of the Himyarites, the lowly Jacob, who is from the region of Edessa, the faithful city of the Romans, in Jesus, the light of the gentiles and the hope of the worlds, and the judge of the dead and the living: Peace.

Jacob rejoices in the faith of the Christians in Himyar and informs them that the Church is praying for them; for the victory of Christ and the trampling of Satan. Later, the third consolation adjures the Himyarites to compare their present suffering with the glory they will gain in heaven. The present world faces. As such, hope should be placed in the world to come. The exposition of Christology provides a basic outline following that of the Nicene Creed. Jacob asserts equality between the Father and the Son, and then describes the incarnation of Jesus and his virgin birth. Jacob then describes Jesus' affairs on Earth, and then hones in on his crucifixion and resurrection. The Henotikon is quoted several times here, including at the conclusion of this section: "These wondrous things and these lowly things are of the one hypostasis of the only-begotten Son. For of him are the sufferings and the miraculous feats." For Jacob, the Christology of Jesus offers answers to the persecutions that the Himyarites suffer. The consolation after the exposition contains three parts: one focusing on the cosmic battle between God and Satan, a second that distinguishes between the soul and the body, and the third that returns to discussing the cosmic battle, though adding mention of the hope that they will receive their reward from God when the end is brought about.

== Reception ==
In Quranic studies, attention has recently been drawn to similarities between Jacob's Letter to the Himyarites and passages in the Quran. Zishan Ghaffar argued that Jacob's articulation of Christology in this letter, which circulated among Arabian Christians, was mirrored in Surat Al-Ikhlas of the Quran, which offers a stylistically and semantically opposite declaration to Jacob's Christological creed in favor of the Quranic version of monotheism. Another area of comparison has been drawn by Javad Hashmi between Jacob's advocacy of eschatological pacifism for the South Arabian Christians that he writes to with the espousal of the same doctrine by Muhammad in the Meccan surahs of the Quran.

== Manuscripts ==
Manuscripts of Jacob's letter to the Himyarites are known from the 6th and 7th centuries.

== Dating ==
The exact date of the letter is controversial and ties into controversies surrounding the dating of the Christian persecutions. The persecutions are typically dated between 518 and 523. The traditional date comes from a well-known text known as the Martyrdom of Arethas, which places the persecution as beginning in the year 835 according to the Seleucid era, which corresponds to 523 AD. However, this late-date is challenged by Jacob's Letter, which could not have been composed any later than 521, the year that Jacob himself died. The table of contents in the Book of the Himyarites evinces two main phases of the persecution: while the eighth chapter regards the 523 AD persecution (corresponding to the massacre of Najran), the title of the lost fourth chapter preserved in the table of contents mentions a persecution of Christians as having occurred before this. A council in the city of Ramla also refers to a persecution of Christians in Southern Arabia, either in 519 or 524. A third, even earlier persecution from the second half of the fifth century is also described in the Ethiopic Martyrdom of Azqir.

== Similar works ==
Simeon of Beth Arsham is said to have written to works relating to the massacre, including the Letter on the Himyarite Martyrs and the Book of the Himyarites. The most important Greek work on this event was the Martyrdom of Arethas.

== See also ==
- Christianity in pre-Islamic Arabia
- Letter on the Himyarite Martyrs, by Simeon of Beth Arsham
- Quranic studies
