= Letter of the Archimandrites of Arabia =

Syriac Monophysite declaration of faith

The Letter of the Archimandrites of Arabia, dated to 570 AD, is a Syriac Monophysite declaration of faith signed by 137 monastic leaders in Roman Arabia. Addressed to Jacob Baradaeus and other Monophysite bishops, the letter intervenes in Christological disputes in opposition to Tritheism. Written in Greek, it survives today in Syriac translation, in a corpus of Monophysite texts from southwest Syria compiled in the late sixth century, known as the Documenta Monophysitarum. The same collection of letters also has a letter containing the response of Jacob. The Letter of the Archimandrites is the most well known document from the Documenta Monophysitarum, and reveals a large rural zone across Roman Arabia dotted with churches and monasteries that were well-connected to the Arab leaders in this time. The letter is an important source for pre-Islamic Arabian Christianity.

== Geography and provincial context ==
The Letter of the Archimandrites contains considerable information about the geographic distribution of monasteries in Roman Arabia, and the relationship between these monasteries and Roman administrative provinces and networks of Ghassanid influence. Scholarly views range from whether the letter reflects a coherent ecclesiastical "province of Arabia," Ghassanid political patronage, or a looser religious network that was not confined to conventional political boundaries. A recent study by Jacob Ashkenazi finds that the villages mentioned in the letter that can be identified were primarily located in Batanea, with only a few on the western fringes of Trachonitis (the Ledja) and the Hauran. According to these findings, Batanea emerges as the core zone of the monastic landscape reflected in the letter.

== Language, ethnicity, and religious identity ==
Of the 137 archimandrites named, 12 bore Arab names, 12 Aramaic-Syriac names, 59 biblical names, and 54 Christian martyr names. Explicitly Semitic names are marginal. Among biblical names, the most common were Elias (15 appearances), John (14), and Job (5). The most frequent martyr names were Sergius (10) and George (7), all common names in the late antique Mediterranean.

The language of the subscriptions further underscores the cultural profile of the region. Only 22 of the 137 signatories signed in Greek, while the remainder signed in Aramaic, with 52 stating that others had signed on their behalf. Notably, all villages mentioned in the letter are named in Aramaic, despite the predominance of Greek in surviving inscriptions from the region. Ashkenazi interprets this pattern as evidence for an emerging Syriac-speaking Monophysite rural culture rather than a clear ethnic boundary.

== Village context of the monasteries ==
The monasteries in the letter are overwhelmingly village-based, and are found in southern Syria. All but three of the monasteries mentioned in the letter were located in villages, and eighteen villages hosted more than one monastic community. Certain villages, notably Dareiyya near Damascus, had an exceptionally high concentration of monasteries and abbots, suggesting that there were entire monastic villages and not isolated convents.

== Titles, ranks, and residences of the signatories ==
The titles held by the signatories reveal the integration of monks into broader, Late Antique rural society. Ten signatories did not hold the title of abbot, including four monks with no ecclesiastical rank. Forty-seven signatories resided in named monasteries, while the remainder belonged to unnamed monastic communities. Many abbots may have headed communities whose members lived in village houses instead of devoted architectural compounds.

A broader statistical analysis by Jacob Ashkenazi has shown that 112 signatories mentioned in the letter held the dual title of priest and abbot, a combination found also in Levantine inscriptions. The remaining signatories included abbots who were deacons, priests without abbatial rank, monks without office, and a small number of other cases. According to Ashkenazi, these findings blur the boundaries between religious specialists and village leaders.

== See also ==
- Archaeology of the Arabian Peninsula
- Letter to the Himyarites
- Martyrdom of Arethas
- Martyrdom of Azqir
