= Kaaba of Najran =

Religious building

Coordinates: 17°28′17.3″N 44°11′40.8″E

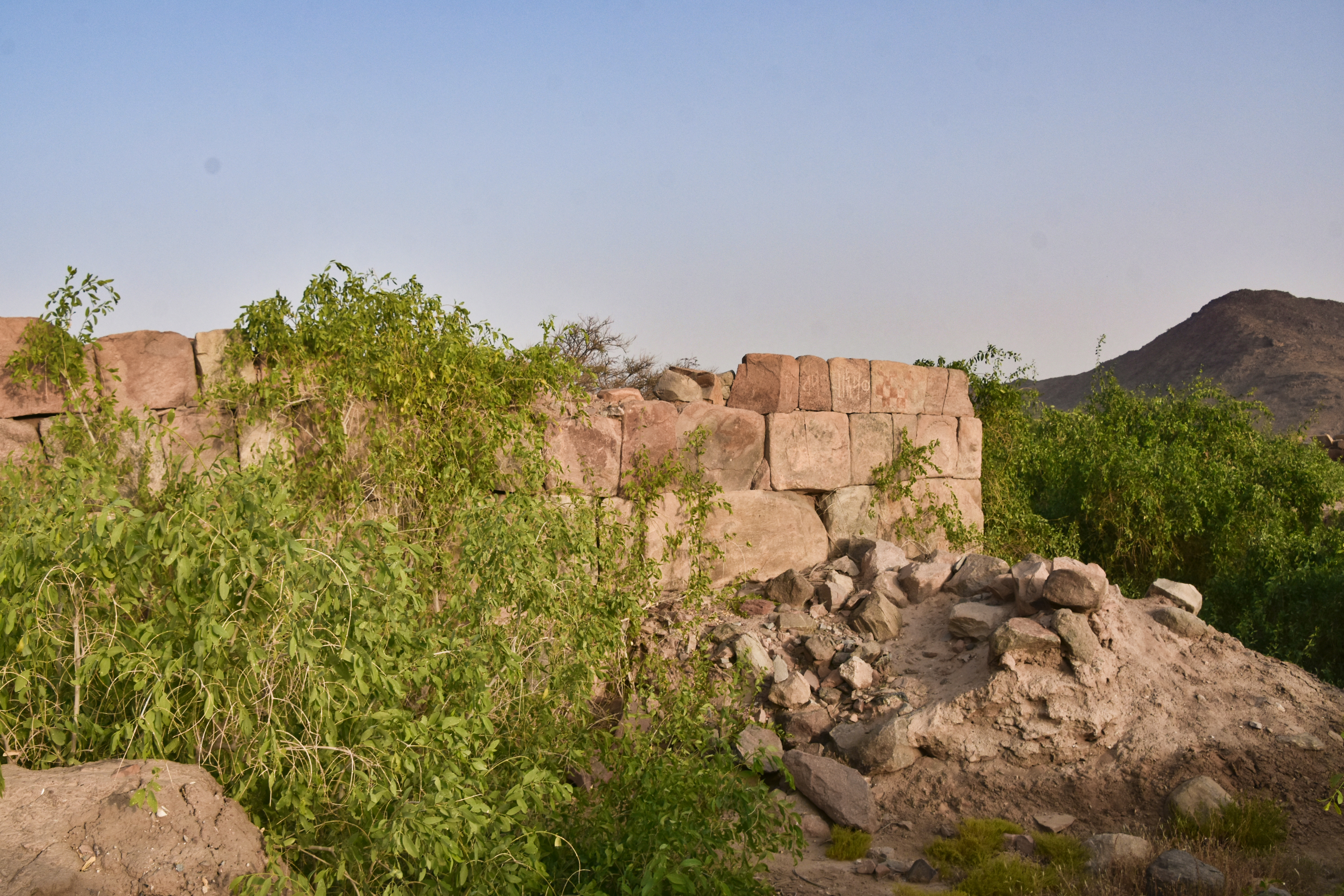
Ruins of the Kaaba of Najran near the ruins of Al-Okhdood

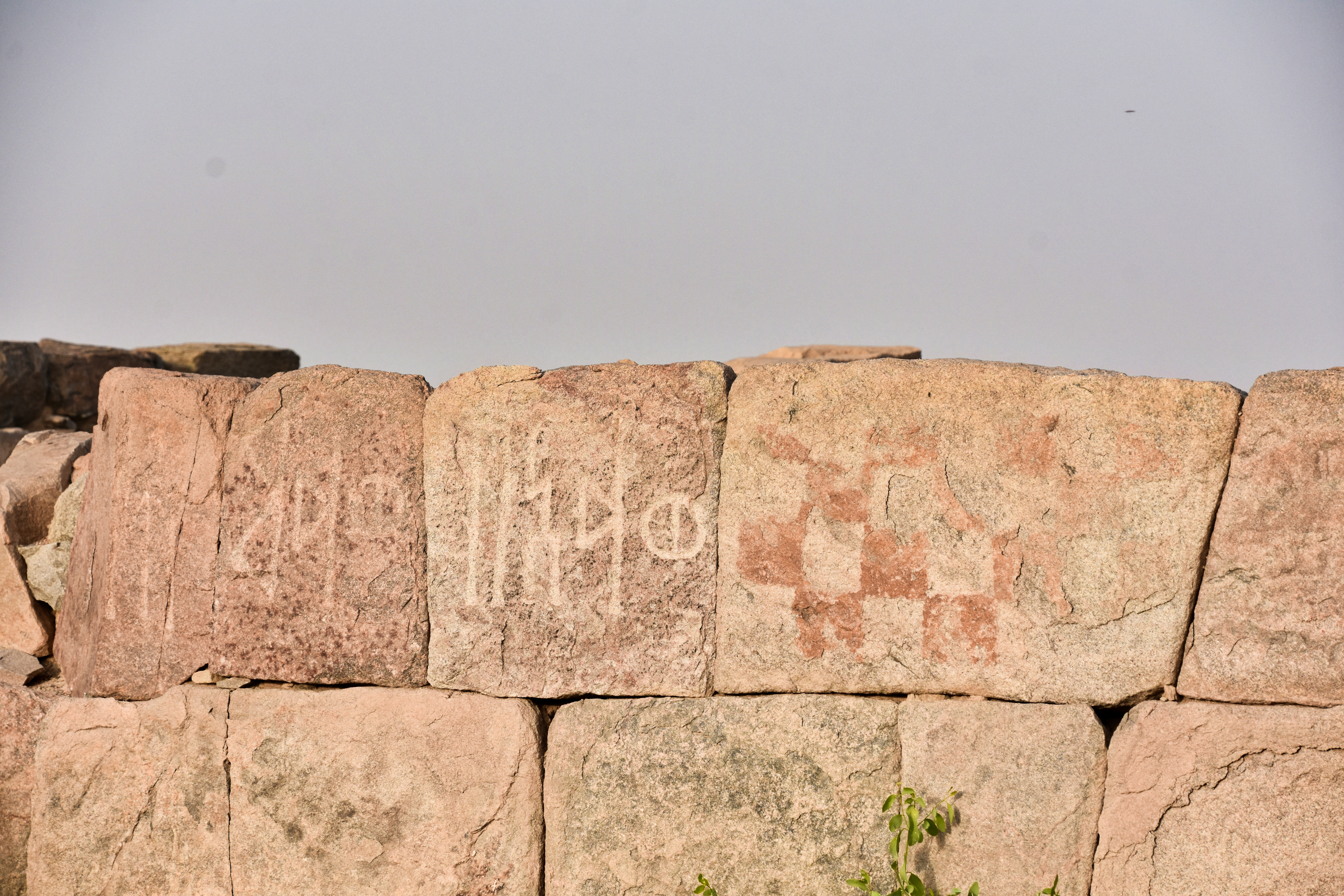
Musnad inscriptions on the Kaaba of Najran

The Kaaba of Najran was a religious building of the Christian community of Najran and one of the Kaabas of pre-Islamic Arabia, located close to the river Nuhairdān. The building appears to have been converted from an earlier Kaʾbatān dedicated to Dhu Samawi, the great god of the city of Najran from the polytheistic era. It was burned down by the Jewish Himyaritic king, Dhu Nuwas, as a part of his famous massacre of Najran's Christians. After Dhu Nuwas was then deposed by the Kingdom of Aksum, who installed a Christian ruler in the region, a martyrium was rebuilt over the site, which may be identical to another Christian building reported in the region, the Martyry of Arethas. The newly built Kaaba became a point of pilgrimage, and its custodians were from Banū ʿAbd al-Madān, the chief clan of the tribe of Balḥārith. As such, Najran became one of the holy cities of Eastern Christianity. Some historians believe that the names of both the Kaaba of Najran, and the Kaaba in Mecca, derive from the common South Arabian term Kʿbt, denoting a type of high building. Both may also have originally been shaped as a dome (qubba), instead of a cube, and the Meccan Kaaba in turn may have been modelled off of a domed church. According to Ibn al-Kalbi, the dome of the Najran Kaaba was made out of animal hides, which some have taken to mean that it was covered like a tent.

The earliest mention of the Kaaba of Najran in Islamic-era literature is in a verse attributed to the pre-Islamic poet, Al-A'sha: "The Kaaba of Najrān is a must for you, until you kneel at its gates / We visit Yazīd, Ἁbd al-Masīḥ and Qays, who are the best of his lords / We contemplated the flowers and the jasmin, as well as the musicians with their flutes". Later references to the Kaaba in Islamic sources appear to ultimately depend on Al-A'sha's poetry. An entry for the Kaaba of Najran appears in the Book of Idols by Hisham ibn al-Kalbi. Ibn al-Kalbi reports that it was not a site of worship, although this is contradicted by other sources, like Al-Bakri and Yaqut al-Hamawi. Ibn al-Kalbi's entry reads:

The banu-al-Harith ibn-Ka’b had in Najran a Ka’bah which they venerated. It is the one which al-A’sha mentions in one of his odes. It has been claimed that it was not a Ka’bah for worship, but merely a hall for those people whom the poet mentioned. In my opinion, this is very likely the case, since I have not heard of the banu al-Harith ever mentioning it in their poetry.

According to Yaqut al-Hamawi, feasts were celebrated outside of the Kaaba's walls with singing, flowers, and drinking. Bakri says that the Kaaba was rectangular and accessible by a staircase.

== See also ==
- Al-Qalis Church
- Christianity in pre-Islamic Arabia
- Church of the East monastery on Sir Bani Yas
- Jubail Church
- Kaaba of Zoroaster
- Martyrdom of Azqir
