= Uthman ibn al-Huwayrith =

Converted Christian

- Born: Mecca, Hejaz
- Died: Byzantium
- Occupations: Poet, Hanif, Interpreter
- Writing career
- Language: Arabic

ʿUthmān ibn al-Ḥuwayrith (Arabic: عثمان بن الحويرث) was an Arab of the Quraysh who was one of the four major hanifs (followers of the Abrahamic tradition) during the time of the Islamic prophet Muhammad, and converted to Christianity. He represents one of several cases of the spread of Christianity in pre-Islamic Arabia, and the Hejaz in particular, in Islamic tradition.

After revolting against idol worship in Mecca in favor of monotheism during the late 6th century, he sought assistance from the Byzantine Empire in 590 in a ploy to install himself as king of Mecca. While in Byzantium, he converted to Christianity. He is also known for having compiled poetic works.

== Biography ==
Uthman was born into the clan of Asad ibn Abd-al-Uzza who belonged to the Quraysh tribe of Mecca. He converted to monotheism while he was young – during a religious feast held by the Quraysh in celebration of their sacrifices made to the idol, Uthman and three of his relatives entered into a secret oath in which they agreed to renounce idol worship in favor of the Abrahamic religions. They based their decision on the belief that idol worship had no textual or spiritual basis.

In 590, he sought intervention from the Byzantine Empire in an attempt to have himself installed as king of Mecca and to bring its inhabitants under the Abrahamic religions. After arriving in Byzantium, he met with a high-ranking government official known as Caesar. In his plea to Caesar, he attempted to convince him that, with Byzantine support, he would help suppress the advance of the Sasanian Empire, with whom the Byzantines were at war. Caesar accepted his request, and bestowed upon him the title of al-Bitriq, an Arabic designation which is reserved for those with military prowess. Uthman also converted to Christianity while in Casear's court.

Uthman also addressed the people of Mecca, stating that under his kingship, the merchant class would flourish as they would be able to secure trade routes to areas under Byzantine control. Although his plan was initially met with success, the ascension came to a dramatic halt after the Meccans suddenly decided to reject his proposition.

It is unknown whether he heard Muhammad's message. It was said that he left the area most likely before the birth of Muhammad. This is because he left around the time Waraqah was in his 20s (Waraqah was 80 when the Prophet was about 40). He traveled to Rome and eventually became an interpreter. It is mentioned that because of this he eventually accepted Christianity, and held a substantial position amongst the society in Rome.

== 9th century historiography ==
Muhammad ibn Habib, a 9th-century Muslim historian, lists Uthman as one of the only two practicing Christians in Mecca during the lifetime of Muhammad. Another 9th-century historian, Ya'qubi, compiled a list to the same effect several years later. Uthman's son was a polytheist who joined the Quraysh tribe in their campaign against the Muslims in the Battle of Badr in 624.
