= Kaabas =

Type of building in ancient Arabia

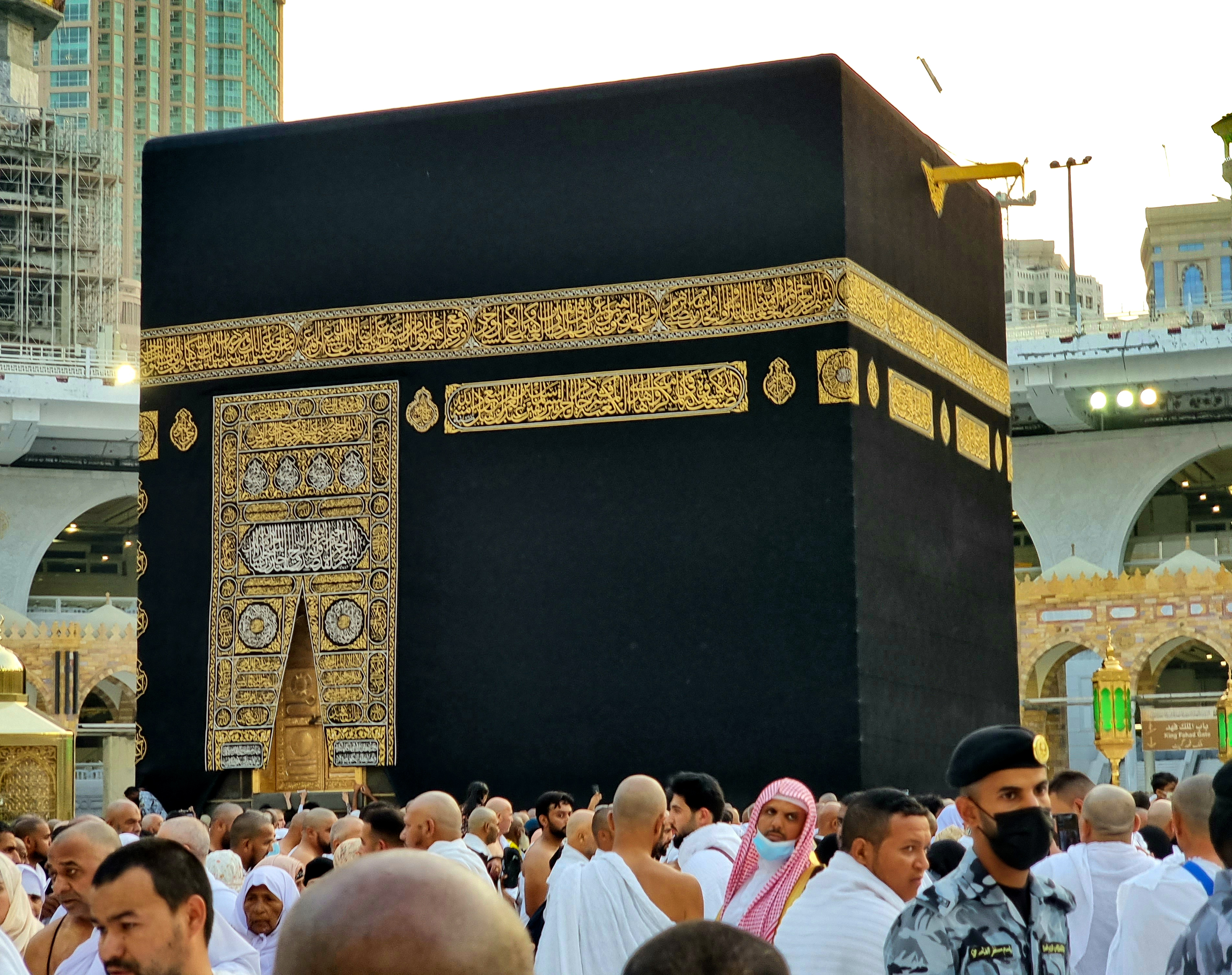
The Kaaba of Mecca, Saudi Arabia

Ka'abas also spelt Ka'bas (Arabic: الكعبات) is the plural term used to describe houses of worship, primarily located in the Arabian Peninsula, that were cubic in shape and resemble the Kaaba structure in Mecca. Most were dedicated to the various gods from the Arabian pantheon, although the term has been used to describe some Christian churches built in a similar style in the Arabian Peninsula.

== Architectural style ==
A typical Kaaba is shaped like a cube or block and functions as a place for the devotees of a particular god or goddess to worship in. The name Kaaba was used by ancient Arabians to describe and label these sites because of their resemblance to the Kaaba at Mecca and the purpose of making pilgrimages to these.

The Kaaba architecture is found in temples throughout the Arabian Peninsula (including in Persia and Mesopotamia), (Note: See the below sources: Kitab al-Asnam and the Encyclopaedia Iranica.) in mosques across the Wusab province of Yemen that were converted into mosques from pre-Islamic cult sites, in the Jinn Blocks of Petra and Hegra, and in kaaba-like tombs of both Jews and Arabs found across the Arabian Peninsula and the Fertile Crescent.

== List of Kaabas ==
The following Kaaba structures are mentioned in the writings of Muslim scholars and historians.

=== Arabian Peninsula ===
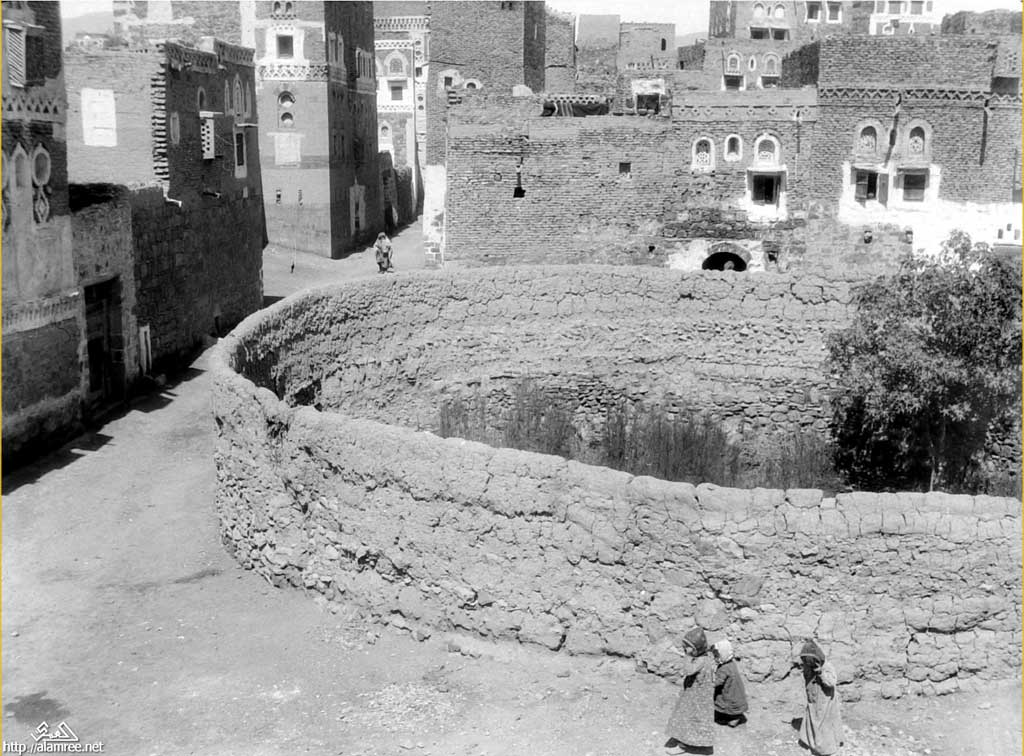
Ruins of the Yemeni Kaaba in the city of Sana'a

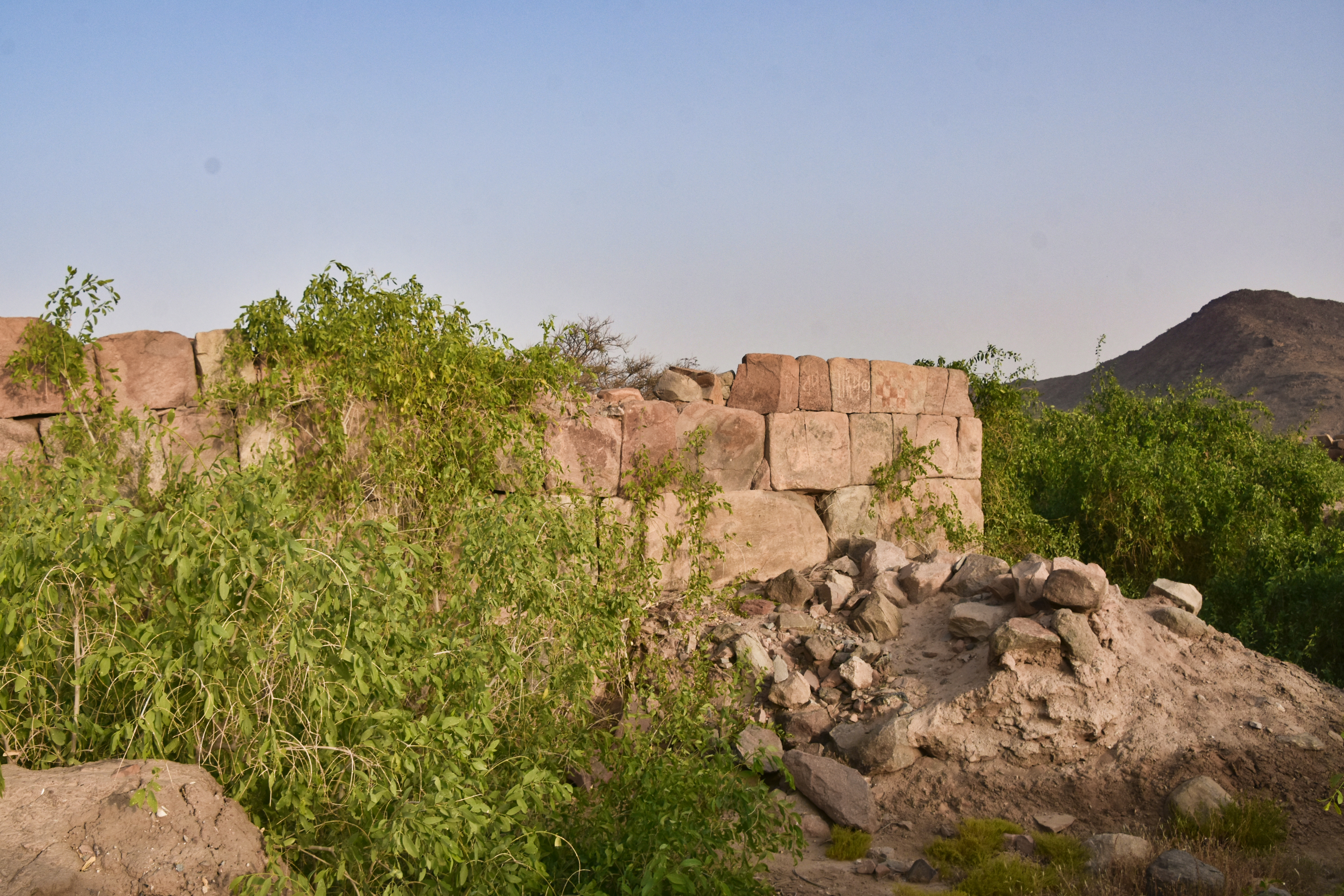
Ruins of the Kaaba of Najran near the ruins of Al-Okhdood

- Kaaba of Najran, a site of worship of in the Christian community of Najran, converted from an earlier Kaaba dedicated to the god Dhu Samawi from the polytheistic era
- Kaaba of Dhu al-Khalasa, worshipped by the Daws tribe
- Kaaba of Dushara, worshipped by the Nabataeans
- Kaaba of Dhu-Ghabat, worshipped by the Banu Lihyan tribe
- Kaaba of al-Lat, worshipped by the Thaqif tribe
- The Kaaba of the Ghatafan tribe
- The Yemeni Kaaba, a church built by the Aksumite garrison in Yemen to rival the Kaaba of Mecca (Note: Safiur Rahman Mubarakpuri mentions that the Yemeni Kaaba was built by Abraha to rival the Kaaba of Mecca. This may indicate the Yemeni Kaaba is the same as the Al-Qalis church which served the exact same purpose.)
- In the Wusab province of Yemen, almost all mosques have a cube-shaped, windowless, single-door architecture. The tombs of saints in the area also follow this pattern. Many of these mosques appear to have been converted from pre-Islamic cult buildings dating to the late antique period of the Arabian peninsula, when this architectural style was common.
- A Kaaba attested for the god Yād
- A Kaaba attested to have been present in the Ukaz sanctuary

=== Mesopotamia ===
- Kaaba Sindad, used by the migrant Arabs as a place for celebrations to be held instead of a place of worship.
- A Kaaba for the god Dushara

=== Persia ===
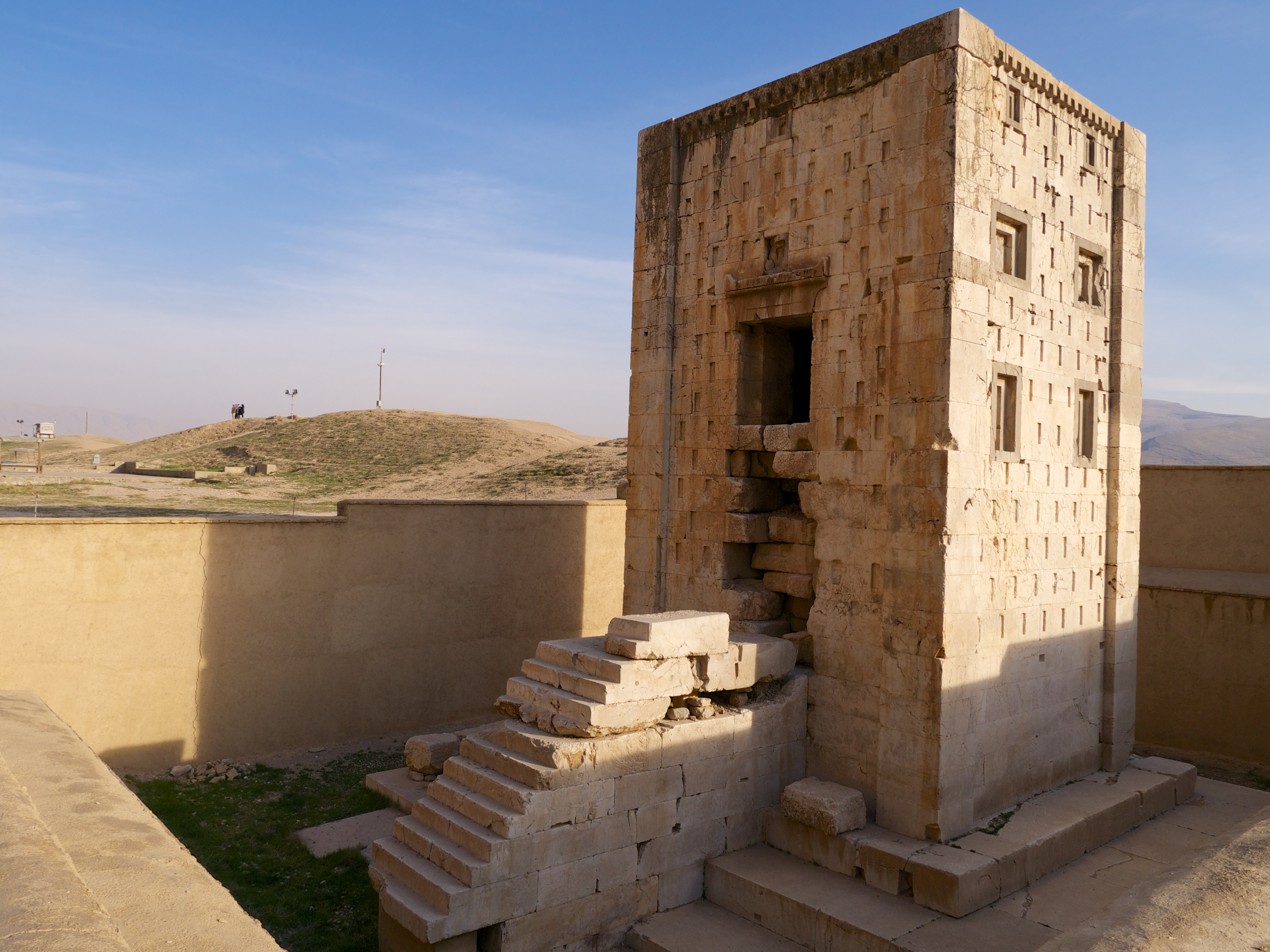
The Kaaba of Zoroaster, located in the Naqsh-e Rostam funeral complex

- Kaaba of Zoroaster, a place of worship for Zoroastrians. It is unlikely to have been a temple; although it did reportedly contain statues of gods that were destroyed by Bardiya according to inscriptions and texts from the Achaemenid period.

== Fate of the Kaabas ==
Most of the Kaabas dedicated to pagan gods in the Arabian Peninsula were destroyed after Islam. Among the destroyed Kaabas include that of the Kaaba of al-Lat that was worshipped by the Thaqif.

=== Conversion into mosques ===
Some said that the Kaaba of Najran in the ancient city of Al-Okhdood became a church after the Aksumites entered Najran as a relief for their Christian brethren who had been persecuted by Dhu Nuwas. The Kaaba of Najran still survives today, although in ruins, and is part of an archaeological site.

The traveller Yaqut al-Hamawi mentions that the Kaaba of Dhu al-Khalasa was converted into a mosque. The site of the Kaaba of al-Lat is also now where the Abd Allah ibn al-Abbas Mosque stands.

== Sources ==
- Finster, Barbara (2010). "Arabia in Late Antiquity: An Outline of the Cultural Situation in the Peninsula at the Time of Muhammad" (PDF). In Neuwirth, Angelika; Sinai, Nicolai; Marx, Michael (eds.). The Qur'an in Context. Historical and Literary Investigations into the Qur'anic Milieu. Brill. pp. 61–114.
- Hawting, Gerald (1999). The Idea of Idolatry and the Emergence of Islam: From Polemic to History. Cambridge University Press.
- Kister, M.J. (1990). Society and Religion from Jahiliyya to Islam. Routledge.
- Robin, Christian Julien (2010). "Nagrān vers l'époque du massacre : notes sur l'histoire politique, économique et institutionnelle et sur l'introduction du christianisme (avec un réexamen du Martyre d'Azqīr)". In Beaucamp, Joelle; Briquel-Chatonnet, Francoise; Robin, Christian Julien (eds.). Juifs Et Chretiens En Arabie Aux Ve Et Vie Siecles: Regards Croises Sur Les Sources. Peeters. pp. 39–106.
- Stockton, Eugene (1971). "Petra Revisited: A Review of a Semitic Cult Complex" (PDF). Australian Journal of Biblical Archaeology. I: 51–73.
- Wheeler, Brannon (2022). Animal Sacrifice and the Origins of Islam. Cambridge University Press.
