= John Diakrinomenos =

John Diakrinomenos (Greek: Ἰωάννης Διακρινόμενος, romanized: Ioannes Diakrinomenos, latinized Diacrinomenus) was a Byzantine ecclesiastical historian of the early 6th century. His nickname refers to his theology: he was one of the "hesitants" (diakrinomenoi) who rejected the Council of Chalcedon. Working in Constantinople, he wrote a history of the church in ten books covering the period from the Council of Ephesus in 431 down to the start of the patriarchate of Severus of Antioch in 512. He dedicated it to his uncle, Bishop Silvanus, who was sent by Emperor Anastasius I to the kingdom of Himyar in 512. It is now lost. There survives only a summary of each book. Already in the 9th century Patriarch Photios I of Constantinople only had access to the first five books, which he included in his Bibliotheca. The fifth book ended with the expulsion of the Peter the Fuller from the patriarchate of Alexandria around 476. Photios mistakenly identified John with the priest John of Aegae because both were anti-Chalcedonian. John is cited by Theodore Lector.

== Editions ==
The surviving fragments of John's history are edited in:

- Günther Christian Hansen, ed. Theodoros Anagnostes, Kirchengeschichte. Berlin: Akademie Verlag, 1971. pp. 152–157.

== Bibliography ==
- Croke, Brian (2018). "John Diacrinomenus". In Nicholson, Oliver (ed.). The Oxford Dictionary of Late Antiquity, Volume 2: J–Z. Oxford: Oxford University Press. p. 823. ISBN 978-0-19-881625-6.
- Kazhdan, Alexander (1991). "Ecclesiastical Historians". In Kazhdan, Alexander (ed.). The Oxford Dictionary of Byzantium. Oxford and New York: Oxford University Press. ISBN 0-19-504652-8.
- Martindale, John R., ed. (1980). "Ioannes (Diacrinomenus) 52". The Prosopography of the Later Roman Empire: Volume II, AD 395–527. Cambridge: Cambridge University Press. p. 606. ISBN 0-521-20159-4.
- Pouderon, Bernard (1997). "Les Fragments anonymes du Baroc. Gr. 142 et les notices consacrées à Jean Diacrinoménos, Basile de Cilicie et l'anonyme d'Héraclée". Revue des études byzantines. 55: 169–192. doi:10.3406/rebyz.1997.1939.
- Treadgold, Warren (2007). The Early Byzantine Historians. Palgrave Macmillan.
