= Martyrdom of Arethas =

The Martyrdom of Arethas (full original title: Martyrium Sancti Arethae et sociorum in civitate Negran), also known as the Acts of Arethas, is a hagiography about the life and martyrdom of Arethas of Najran, the leader of the Najran's Christians in the early 6th century. The Martyrdom was written in Greek c. 560 AD, and survives through its translations into Latin, Ethiopic, and Arabic. The Martyrdom describes the role played by the Jewish king of the Himyarite Kingdom of South Arabia, Dhu Nuwas, in laying the city of Najran to siege and then massacring its Christian inhabitants and burning their churches.

Scholars disagree on some of the sources of the text. Some believe that it was based on the Book of the Himyarites, whereas others think it was based on Simeon of Beth Arsham's Letter on the Himyarite Martyrs. Irfan Shahid has argued that Simeon is also the author of the Martyrdom. The Martyrdom survives in a tenth-century manuscript, but was likely written shortly after the second Aksumite expedition into South Arabia in 525, based on oral testimonies from eyewitnesses.

Alessandro Bausi and Alessandro Gori have edited the Ethiopic recension of the Martyrdom. Irfan Shahid has argued that the Martyrdom is a reliable account.

== Synopsis ==
The text begins with ethnographic information about South Arabia, including its Christian and Jewish communities. According to the Martyrdom, Dhu Nuwas tried forming an alliance with the Persian Sasanian Empire based on a mutual opposition to two Christian states, the Byzantine Empire and the Kingdom of Aksum (in Ethiopia). In 524, the account says that Dhu Nuwas sent a letter describing his massacre of Najran's Christians to a conference being held in the city of Ramla, where delegates from both the Byzantine and Sasanian empires were present. In response, the Byzantine emperor at the time, Justin I (r. 518–527) sent an ambassador to Arabia to secure the safety of the remaining Christians in Arabia. In addition, he sent a letter to Kaleb, the king of Aksum, urging him to invade Himyar, which he then did with Justin's support (using military support also reported by Procopius), bringing an end to Jewish rule over South Arabia in the aftermath of the Aksumite invasion of Himyar. The Martyrdom therefore represents the motivations of the invasion as religious in nature, although today, historians also believe that additional economic and political factors were at play in causing the invasion to take place.

According to the Martyrdom, after his success in South Arabia, Kaleb abdicated his throne and took up a monastic life, an idea also found in the Ethiopian Synaxarium, although this detail about Kaleb's later years is not yet verified from contemporary Ethiopic sources.

== See also ==
- Letter of the Archimandrites of Arabia
- Letter on the Himyarite Martyrs
- Martyrdom of Azqir
