= Christian J. Robin =

French orientalist (b. 1943)

Christian Julien Robin
- Born: 12 May 1943 (81 years old); Chaumont, Haute-Marne, France
- Education: Paris Institute of Political Studies, INALCO, EPHE
- Occupation: Orientalist
- Writing career
- Language: French, English
- Notable awards: France: Legion of Honour; Ordre des Palmes académiques; Yemen: Medal of the Order of Culture and Arts

Christian Julien Robin (born 12 May 1943) is a French orientalist and scholar specializing in the history and culture of the Arabian Peninsula. He has received three awards, including the Legion of Honour. He has notably worked on pre-Islamic Arab monotheism.

== Biography ==
Christian Julien Robin was born on 12 May 1941 in Chaumont. He graduated from the Paris Institute of Political Studies in 1964, INALCO in 1967 and the EPHE in 1978. He also worked as a lecturer at the Aix-Marseille University and Université Sorbonne Nouvelle. In 2011, Robin was appointed as one of the head directorial executives at the French National Centre for Scientific Research.

Robin has also headed overseas archaeological expeditions since 2005 in Saudi Arabia, specifically the town of Najran. Currently, Robin holds a doctorate in Arabic and Islamic studies and is the president of the Société des Archéologues, Philologues et Historiens de l'Arabie, succeeding Jean Schneider in 2017.

== Publications ==
Robin has contributed to entries in the Oxford Handbook of Classical Antiquity.

He has also published the following works:

- Robin, Christian J. (2012). Les signes de la prophétie en Arabie à l'époque de Muḥammad (fin du vie et début du viie siècle de l'ère chrétienne). BRILL. ISBN 978-90-04-21091-2.
- Template:Cite article
- Robin, Christian J. (1982). Les Hautes-Terres du Nord-Yémen avant l'Islam : Recherches sur la géographie tribale et religieuse de Hawlān Quḍāʿa et du pays de Hamdān. Nederlands Historisch-Archaeologisch Instituut te Istanbul.
- Robin, Christian J. (2016). Le judaïsme de l'Arabie antique. Turnhout, Belgium: Brepols.
- Robin, Christian J. (2014). Les Jafnides : Des rois arabes au service de Byzance. Paris: De Boccard.

== Honours ==
- Knight of the Legion of Honour (France)
- Commander of the Ordre des Palmes académiques (France)
- Medal of the Order of Culture and Arts (Yemen)
