= Martyrdom of Azqir =

Christian hagiography

The Martyrdom of Azqīr or the Acts of Azqir (Gadla Azqir) is a short Christian hagiography of a preacher named Azqir living in the Himyarite city of Najran. Azqir lived in the second half of the fifth century, during the reign of the Jewish king Sharhabil Yakkuf. He was said to have been one of the first Christians of the city, and its first preacher. Ultimately, Azqir is executed by the king for his religious activities.

The martyrdom of Azqir is the first report of a Christian being killed for their faith in South Arabia, part of the first wave of the persecution of the Christian community of Najran, around 20–30 years after conversions began in the region. The Ethiopian church commemorates the martyrdom of Najranite Christians like Azqir on the date of their calendar 24 Hedar, two days before the commemoration of the martyrdom of Arethas of Najran, who was killed during the great massacre of the Christians of Najran during the reign of Dhu Nuwas.

== Summary ==
The text opens with a Trinitarian formula, and then opens that it is about the spiritual struggles and martyrdom of Azqir, the to first to preach and teach Christianity in Najran, and that the events it reports took place during the reign of the Himyarite king Sharhabil Yakkuf (r. 468–480 AD). The first part of the story is about how Azqir built a tent for prayer and a sign of the cross, but how this was then taken down and ruined by Najran's princess, who also threw him into prison. There, a group of Najranites secretly look for his guidance, ultimately leading to him baptizing 50 men. Azqir's activities gain him the hostility of several influential groups in the area, who decide to report him to the king for preaching "a new religion". Shortly afterwards, he was summoned before the king in the city of Zafar, the capital of the kingdom, to account for these charges. He was taken into custody, and transported to Zafar by a group of traders already heading towards the city. Azqir attempted to argue that Christianity is not a new religion, but the king was unconvinced. The king offers several proposals, but Azqir does not accept them. At one point, the kings rabbinic authorities interject and recommend the king that he send Azqir back to Najran where he can be executed publicly as an example. The king accepts this proposal and it is promptly carried out, resulting in the martyrdom of Azqir. The first attempted method of execution was by stoning. However, according to the story, the first person to cast a stone at Azqir was a Jewish man present with his wife and son. The man, however, misses his stone. His own son collapses dead, and his wife falls prey to worms. This puts a stop to the plan of stoning. Another man suggests that Azqir is beheaded with a sword. A Christian present during the execution is asked for his sword to carry this out. The Christian refuses, until Azqir insists that he allow this to happen. Azqir is then finally executed. According to a notice in the story mentioned after his death, there were 38 martyrs besides Azqir, including bishops, priests, monks, and lay people. Their martyrdom is commemorated by the Ethiopian church on the date of their calendar 24 Hedar, two days before the commemoration of the martyrdom of Arethas of Najran, who was killed during the great massacre of the Christians of Najran during the reign of Dhu Nuwas.

The Martyrdom of Azqir includes several miracle accounts, when he miraculously opens up the prison doors of the facility he is in so that he can baptize a group of people seeking his help, when he replenishes water while for the trader group taking to Najran when they run out, and later during his execution, when he is to be stoned, but the first person to throw a stone misses and themselves collapse dead.

== Reliability and historical context ==
Christian J. Robin's analysis of the place-names, person names, and ethnic names mentioned in the story, which has been followed by Alessandro Baussi and Vitagrazia Pisani, has led him to his conclusion that the account knows of several facts that would have been unavailable to him from the manuscript tradition, indicating that the text provides direct and reliable references into the Christian context of South Arabia in the second half of the fifth century, and that it, or its source, was written by someone from Najran. Five place-names (toponyms) are mentioned in the story: (1) Qafnāyt, the prison of Najran (2) Waḍḥō, a place mentioned in the Sifat Jazīrat al-ʿArab of Al-Hamdani and was said to have been sanctified by Muhammad in Islamic accounts (3) a desert called Gawʿān (4) the main site of the story, Najran (5) and Zafar, the capital of the Himyarite Kingdom. Three personal names are mentioned in the story. The first is the king Sharhabil Yakkuf, whose name is spelled in a corrupted way in the story. The second is a prince called za-Səʾləbān. In Sabaic, this corresponds to Dhu Tha'laban, who would have been a member of a lineage by that name known from a few inscriptions dated between 350 and 550 AD and in some documents from the Arabo-Islamic tradition. The third is another prince named za-Qēfān. This name is not attested in inscriptions, but it is attested in the Arabo-Islamic tradition, where it is spelled Dhu Qayfān. According to Christian J. Robin, the Martyrdom's choice of naming this figure by his family instead of his lineage (as was custom at the time) speaks in favor of the story's reliability. Fourth, Azir, the protagonist of the story. Fifth, Kīryāq, a disciple of Azqir, whose name comes from the Greek Kyriakos. The Martyrdom mentions to ethnonyms: Tōnāḥ, which must be identified with the tribal confederation Tanukh, and Ḥamēr, which is known from contemporary sources.

== Date and language ==
The text is only preserved in Ethiopic manuscripts, but its original language is a matter of debate. Robin believes that it was translated from an Arabic version, but he does not join Conti Rossini in positing a Syriac original behind the Arabic text. Robin places the date of the Ge'ez (Ethiopic) translation before the 15th century, on the basis that Azqir had become reputable in Ethiopia by then, and places the Arabic original no earlier than the 8th century. Bausi, who has more recently edited the newest critical edition of the text, does not find that the hypothesis of an Arabic original is guaranteed, but accepts Robin's arguments against an original in Syriac or a South Arabian language.

== Etymology of Azqir ==
Beeston suggests that the name Azqir may have an Arabic etymology, adh-dhakīr, "the far-famed", but this is rejected by Robin, who considers the name unexplained but entertains Ryckman's suggestion of a derivation from Yazdin.

== Editions and translations ==
The most recent critical edition, along with a translation into Italian, of the Martyrdom of Azir was published by Alessandro Bausi in 2017. An earlier edition was produced by Carlo Conti Rossini. A German translation was published by Hugo Winckler in the 19th century.

== See also ==
- Letter of the Archimandrites of Arabia
- Martyrdom of Arethas
