= Letter on the Himyarite Martyrs =

Letter on the massacre of Najran's Christians

The Letter on the Himyarite Martyrs was a Syriac letter by Simeon of Beth Arsham in response to the massacre of the Christian community of Najran by the Jewish monarch of Himyar, Dhu Nuwas. The letter was directly addressed to Bishop Simeon of Gabbula, one of many Christian writings during the period composed in response to the massacre. The letter talks about the attempt by the Himyarite king to forcefully convert the Christians of Najran to Judaism, his execution of hundreds of Ethiopian Christians and his burning down of churches with the clergy and laity still inside, and emphasizes noble acts of defiance against the king by some of his Christian subjects. The letter has a detailed transmission and is extant in multiple sources. It was quoted, in full, by John of Ephesus (d. 586), it was copied into the Chronicle of Zuqnin, and it was copied into the Ecclesiastical History of Pseudo-Zacharias Rhetor around 569.

In the 1970s, Irfan Shahid found and published two more letters attributed to Simeon on the topic of the Christians of Najran in the aftermath of their massacre. The original, main text is sometimes known as "Letter C", whereas Shahid's two new texts are called "Letter 1" and "Letter 2". Only "Letter C" may have any historical utility, and the authorship of the other two letters is disputed.

== Title ==
The full title of the text, according to its incipit, is From the letter or history concerning the Himyarite martyrs of Symeon, the bishop of the Persian Christians, which was sent from al-Hirah of Beth Numan. The full title suggests that the letter was originally sent out from the city of Al-Hira.

== Authorship ==
The text is traditionally attributed to Simeon of Beth Arsham, a Persian bishop, but this authorship is seen as difficult to establish by modern historians. Two letters on the topic of the Himyarite massacre of Najran's Christians are attributed to Simeon: a first letter, published by I. Guidi in 1881, and a second and more recently discovered one, published by Irfan Shahîd in 1971. Shahid considers Simeon to be the single author of both works. However, the letters internally contain or quote additional works, such as a letter from the Himyarite to the Lakhmid kings, suggesting that these letters could be a pastiche of originally distinct sources.

== Historical background ==
The events described in the Letter on the Himyarite Martyrs occurred in the early 6th century (approximately 523 AD) within the kingdom of Himyar, located in the southwestern Arabian Peninsula in modern-day Yemen. During this period, Himyar was ruled by a Jewish king named Yūsuf Asʾar Yathʾar (also known as Dhu Nuwas). While Yūsuf was one of the first outwardly Jewish kings of the region, Himyarite inscriptions indicate that the area had embraced monotheism as early as the late fourth century.

Politically, Himyar faced a significant threat from the Kingdom of Aksum (located in modern-day Ethiopia), a Christian power located across the Bab-el-Mandeb. In 523 AD, Yūsuf besieged the city of Najran, a Christian stronghold on the border of modern Yemen and Saudi Arabia, and began a systematic persecution of its Christian community. This campaign is interpreted by some historians as a strategic provocation against the Christian, Aksumite rivals. The provocation led to a successful invasion by the Aksumite king, Kaleb of Axum, who defeated the Himyarites and established Christian rule in the region.

These events are documented not only by Simeon's letters, but a constellation of additional sources in Syriac, Arabic, and Greek.

== Synopsis ==
The Letter on the Himyarite Martyrs is structured as a report written by Simeon while he was at Hirta of Beth Nu'man in January 524 AD. Simeon explains that while traveling with a Roman envoy, Mar Abraham bar Euphoros, and camping at a Ghassanid site where the king Al-Mundhir III was currently stationed, the Ghassanid king received a boastful messenger and letter from the Himyarite king about his persecution of Najran's Christians, advising Al-Mundhir to follow suit and do the same. The core of the document contains the Himyarite king's own account of his campaign. After the death of a previous king installed by the Ethiopians, Yūsuf seized control and sought to force Christians to convert to Judaism. The letter details several atrocities, including the execution of 280 Ethiopian Christians and the conversion of their church into a synagogue, the siege of the city of Najran which surrendered only after Yūsuf gave a false oath of safety, the desecration of the remains of Bishop Paul whose bones were exhumed and burned, and the burning of a church with the clergy and laity still inside.

The text highlights the defiance of the Najranite Christians. A noblewoman named Dawma is a central figure; she publicly proclaimed her faith, baring her head in the marketplace, which was then considered to be an act of social defiance. This resulted in the execution of both her and her daughters; the king forced her to drink her children's blood before beheading her as well. Another prominent figure in the letter is the elderly leader Harith bar Ka'b, who rebuked the king for his dishonesty and predicted that Christianity would eventually triumph over his kingdom. The text also includes an account of a three-year-old child who refused the king's gifts, insulted the king's "rotten" scent, and insisted on dying with his mother rather than renouncing the Messiah.

Simeon concludes by urging the Christian world to respond. He suggests that the Bishop of Alexandria should encourage the Ethiopians to intervene. Furthermore, he advises the Romans to imprison Jewish leaders in Tiberias, a city in northern Israel, to use as leverage to stop the persecution in Himyar. The letter ends with a later note stating that the Ethiopians eventually defeated the Jewish king by drowning him in the sea and restored Christian rule.

== English translations ==
- Arthur Jeffery, "Christianity in South Arabia," The Muslim World 36:3 (1946): 193-216
- J. Edward Walters, "Simeon of Beth Arsham, Letter on the Himyarite Martyrs," in Eastern Christianity: A Reader, p. 88-103
