= Kharjah =

Kharjah may refer to:

- Kharja, a medieval poetry genre in Spain and Portugal
- Abu Kharjah, a place in northern Iraq
- Al Kharjah, Iraq, a town near Samarra
- Al Kharjah, an oasis in Saudi Arabia
