= Najran Province =

Province of Saudi Arabia

Coordinates: 17°29′30″N 44°07′56″E

Najran Province منطقة نجران
- Province
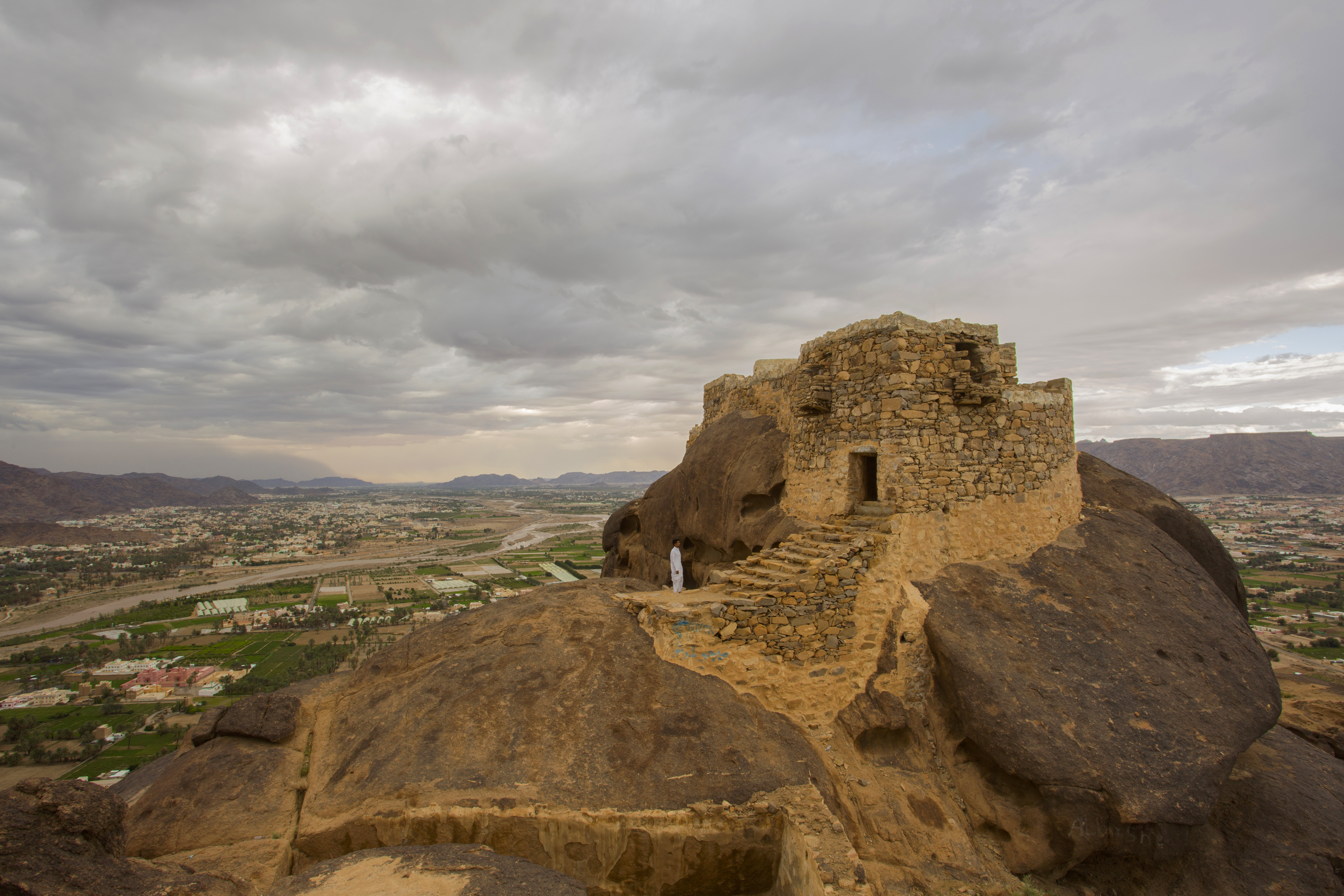
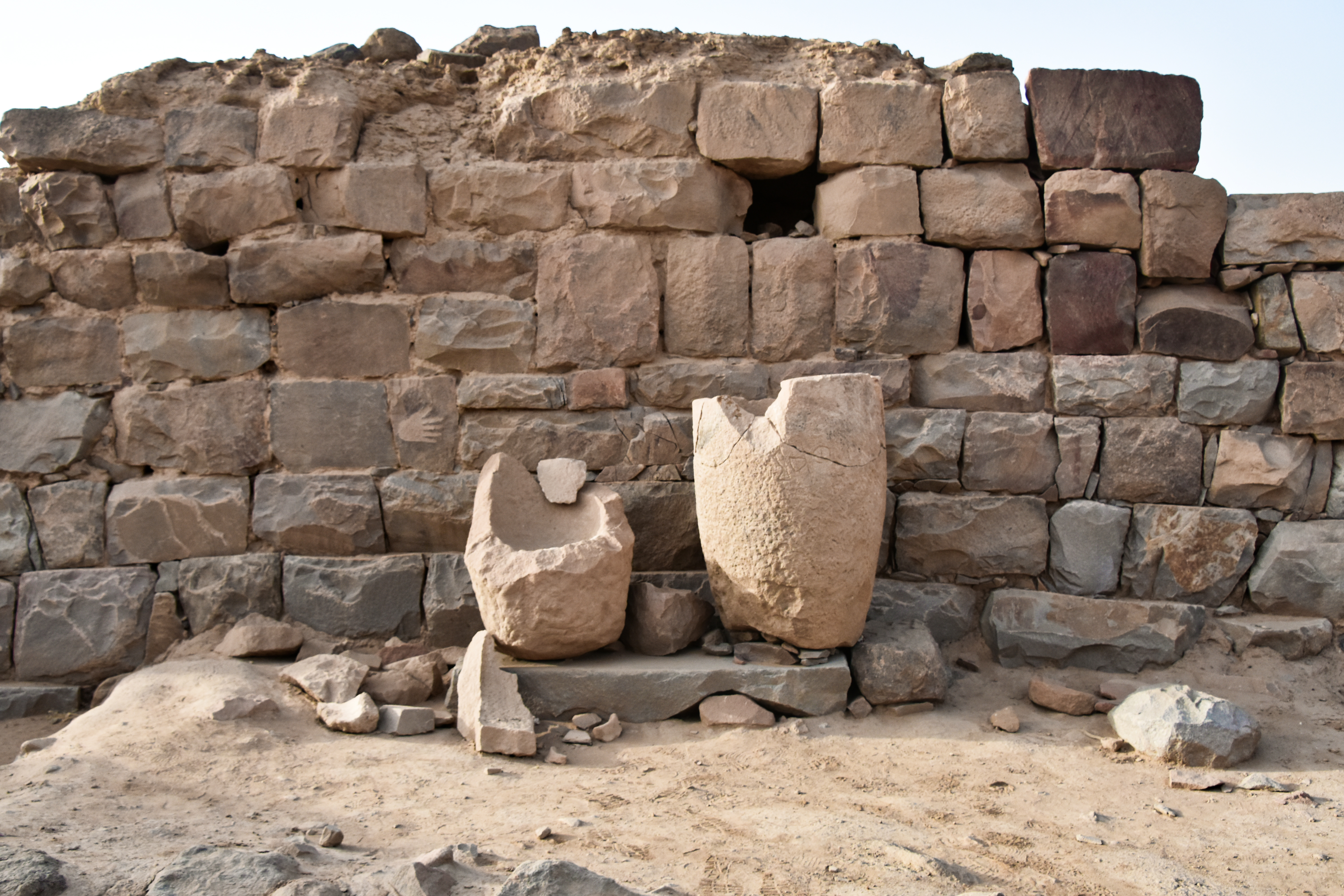
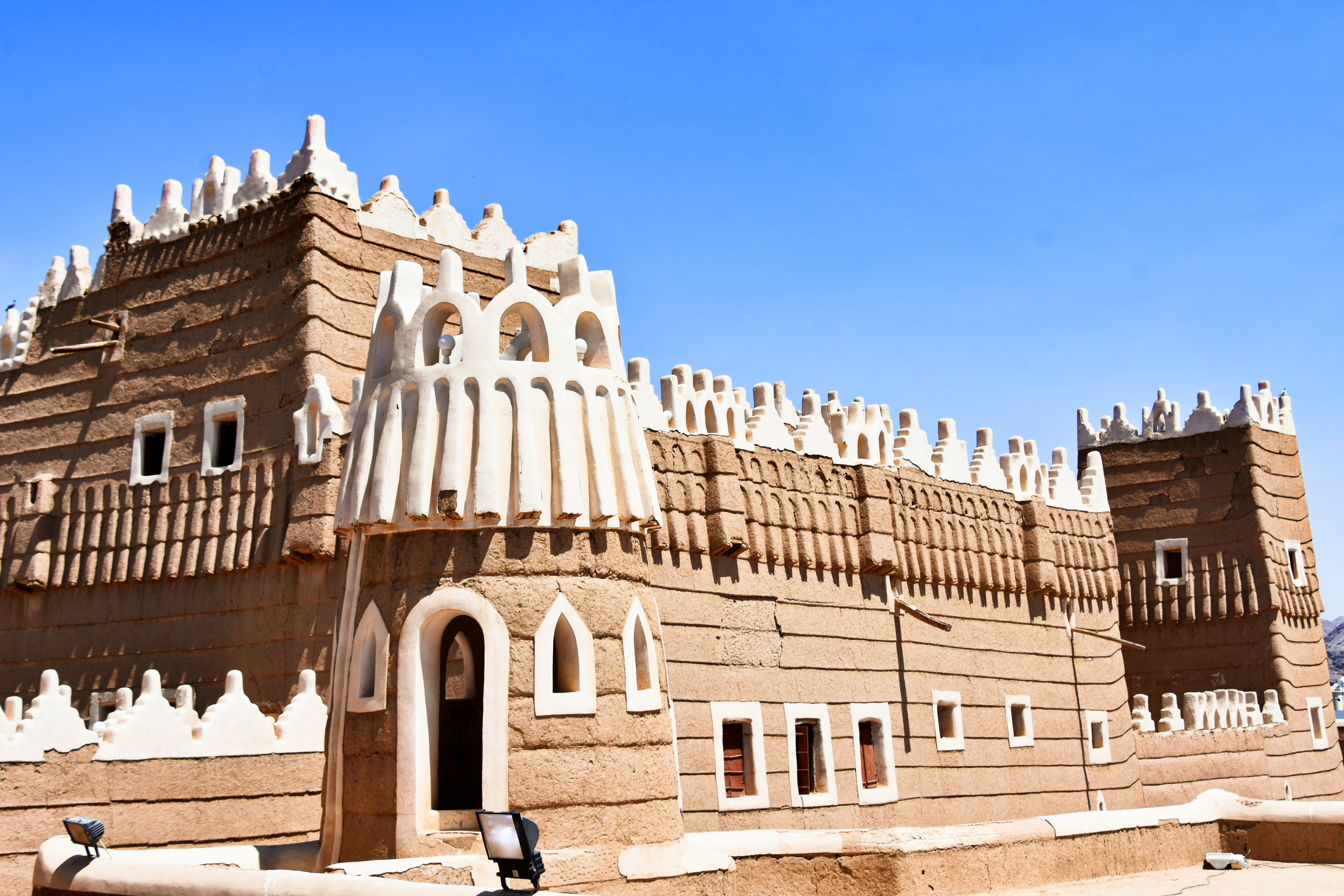
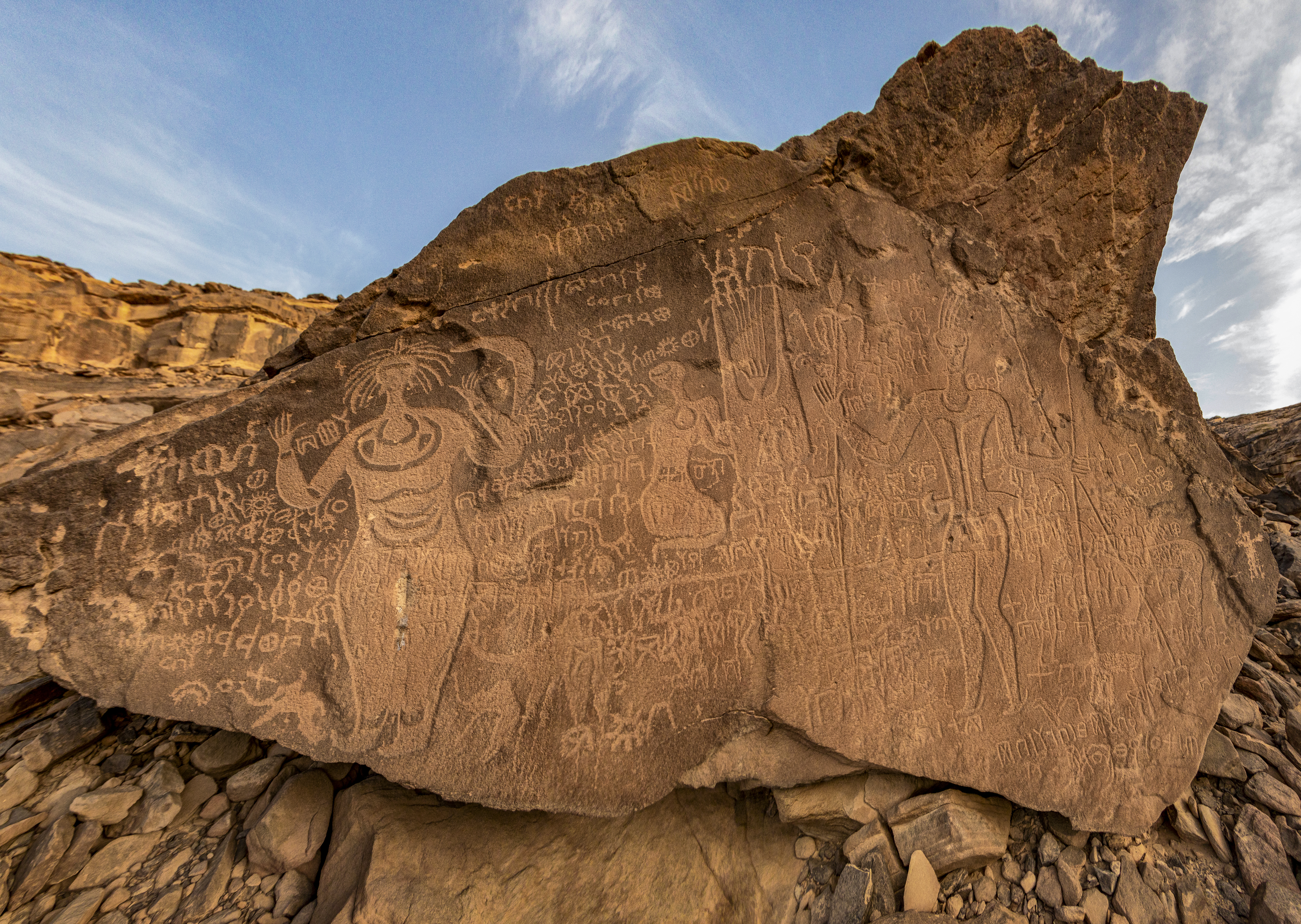
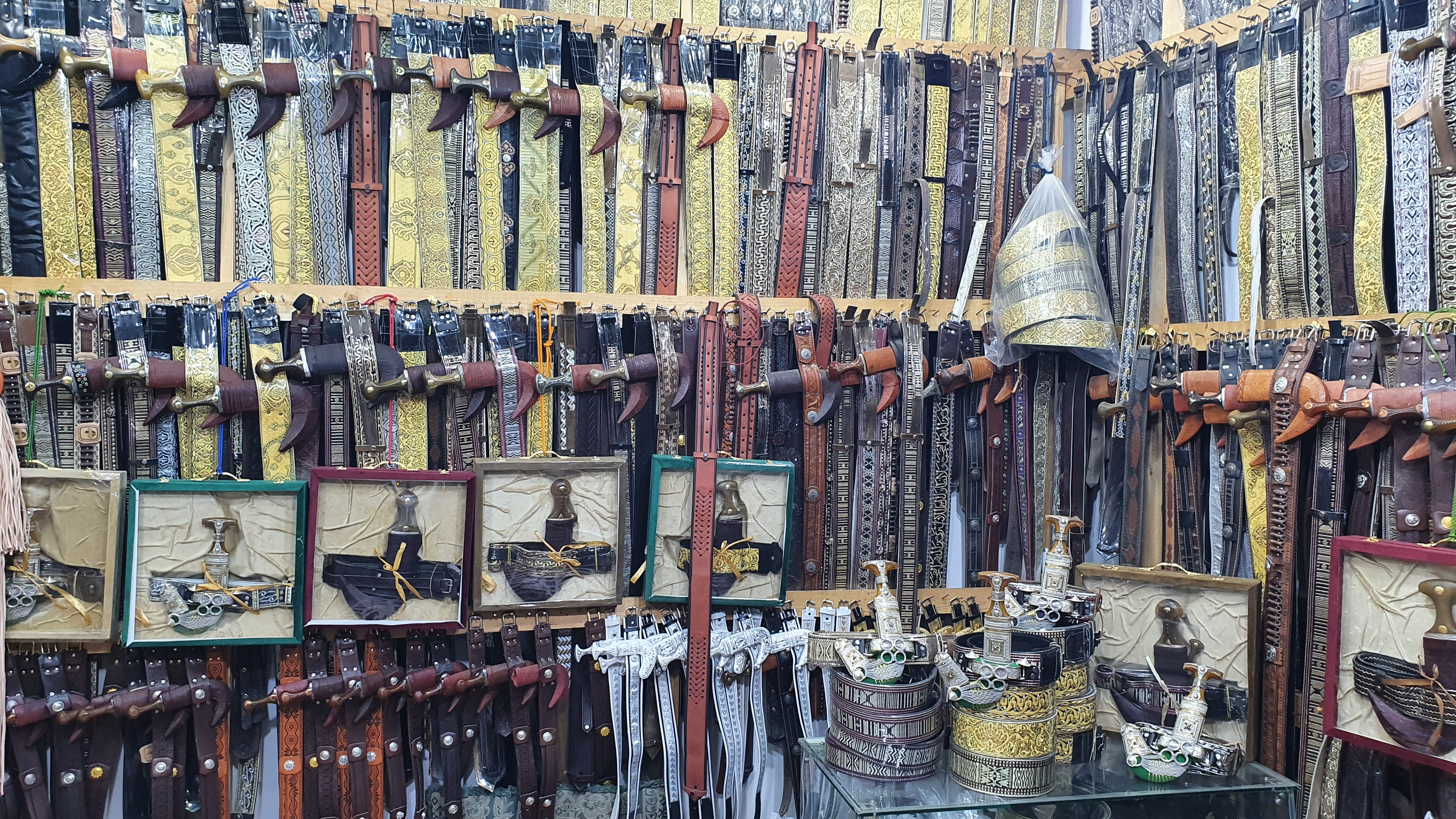
- Raum Castle Al-Okhdood Historic Imarah Palace Rock Inscription, Bir Hima Najrani Jambiya Shop

- Seal

- Map of Saudi Arabia with Najran highlighted
- Country: Saudi Arabia
- Region: South Arabia
- Seat: Najran
- Governorates: 6

Government
  - Type: Municipality
  - Body: Najran Municipality
  - Governor: Jiluwi bin Abdulaziz
  - Deputy Governor: Turki bin Hathlul

Area
  - Total: 149,511 km^{2} (57,727 sq mi)

Population (2022 census)
  - Total: 592,300
  - Density: 3.962/km^{2} (10.26/sq mi)
- Demonym(s): Najrani (Male); Najraniyah (Female)
- Time zone: UTC+03:00 (SAST)
- ISO 3166-2: 10
- Area code: 017
- Website: www.najran.gov.sa

Najran Province (Note: (Arabic: منطقة نجران, romanized: Minṭaqat Najrān), also known as the Najran Region) is a province in southern Saudi Arabia, covering 150,000 km² and located along the border with Yemen. Its capital is Najran. The province is primarily inhabited by the Yam tribe, and most of its population follows Ismaili Shia Islam.

== Etymology ==
There are various stories about the origins of the name Najran. Some of these stories attribute it to a wooden piece around which a door's henge rotates. Others say that the city was named after its first settler, Najran bin Zaidan bin Saba'a bin Ya'rub bin Qahtan.

== History ==
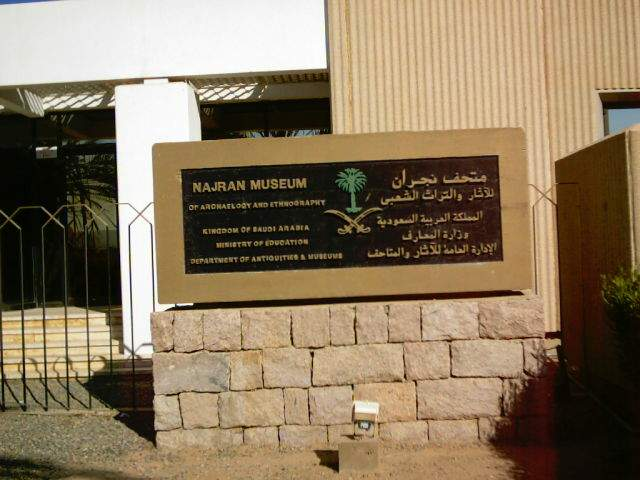
Najran Museum entrance

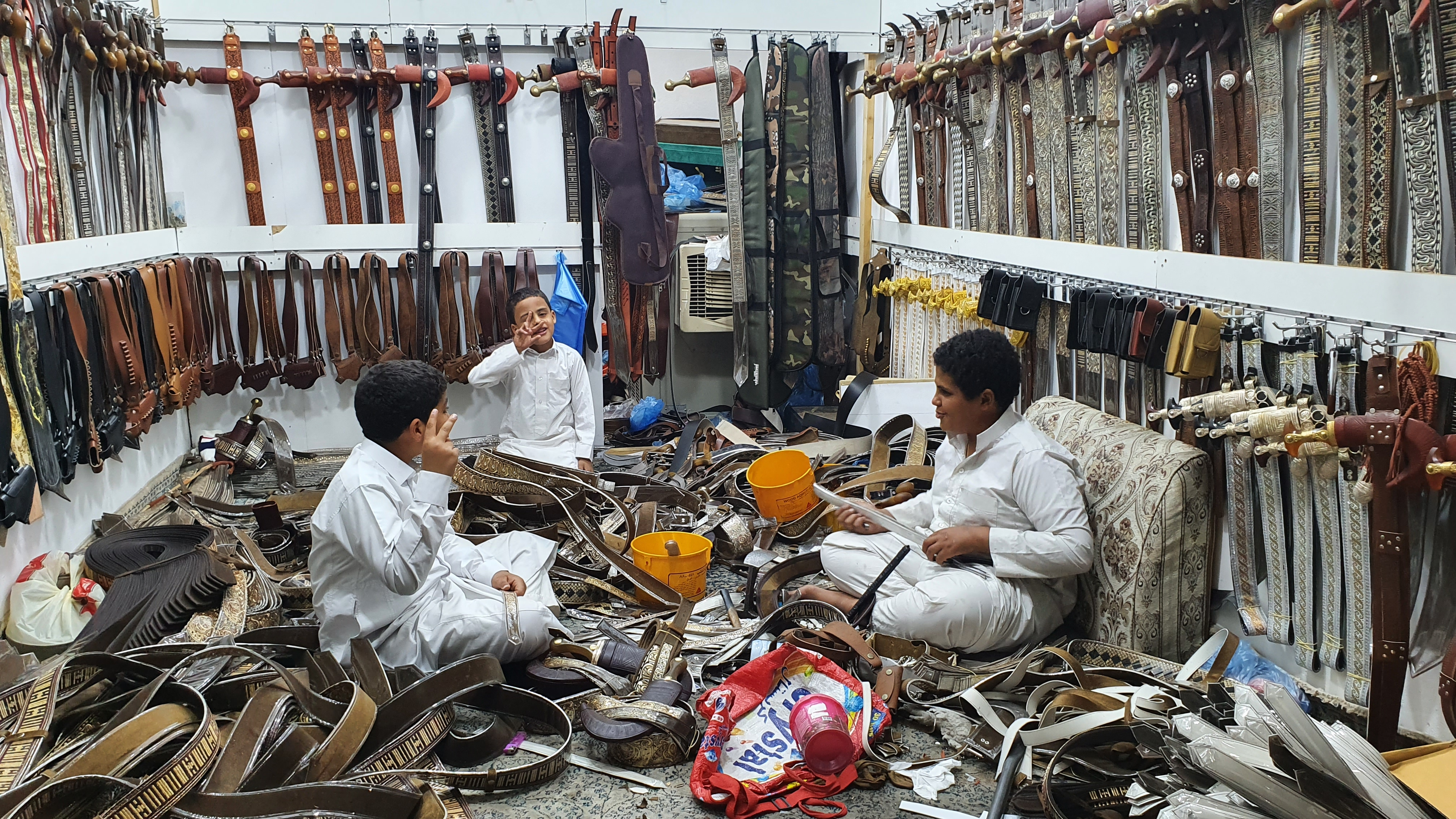
Children working in a tradional Najrani Jambiya shop

=== Early history ===
Similar to other ancient place names in Arabia, Najrān may have originally been the name of the whole oasis, including all towns and villages. The old name of the ruins now known as "al-Ukhdūd", which may have been the central town, probably corresponds to Ramat.

According to Greek and Roman sources, Najrān was a focal point of the Incense Route. All routes that left ancient Yemen to the north or west had to meet at Najrān, where the routes branched into two general directions: ones leading north through the Ḥijāz towards Egypt and the Levant, and those leading to the northeast towards Gerrha near the Persian Gulf.

The Roman prefect of Egypt Aelius Gallus led a costly, arduous, and ultimately unsuccessful expedition to conquer Arabia Felix, and won a battle near Najrān in 25 BC. He occupied the city and used it as a base from which to attack the Sabaean capital at Ma'rib. This is according to Strabo, who called it 'Negrana'.

When the Ḥimyarites conquered the Sabeans in AD 280, they probably also took control of Najrān. Sometime during the 3rd century, the people of Najrān sided with the Abyssinians, who sent a governor named Sqlmqlm in inscriptions. The Ḥimyar King Ilsharah Yahdib crushed this rebellion.

The north Arabian Lakhmid king Imru’ al-Qays ibn 'Amqu attacked Najrān in AD 328. Under the influence of Axum, the Christians in Najrān thrived and started an alliance with Aksum again at the beginning of the 6th century.

The town of Najrān was already an important centre of arms manufacture during the lifetime of Muhammad. However, it was more famous for leather rather than iron.

=== Early Christian community ===
Christianity was likely introduced into Najrān, as in the rest of South Arabia, in the 5th century AD or perhaps a century earlier. According to the Arab Muslim historian Ibn Isḥāq, Najrān was the first place where Christianity took root in South Arabia. According to contemporary sources, after seizing the throne of the Ḥimyarites in ca. 518 or 523, Dhū Nuwās, a Jewish king, attacked the mainly Christian Aksumite garrison at Zafar, capturing it and burning its churches. He then moved against Najrān, a Christian and Aksumite stronghold. After accepting the city's capitulation, he massacred those inhabitants who would not renounce Christianity. Estimates of the death toll from this event range up to 20,000 in some sources. A surviving letter (where he is called Dimnon) written by Simeon, the bishop of Beth Arsham in 524 AD, recounts Dhū Nuwās's persecution in Najrān (modern al-Ukhdūd in Saudi Arabia). The massacre is also recounted in a celebratory manner in an inscription (Ja 1028) commissioned by one of the army commanders of Dhu Nuwas.

According to the Siyar of ash-Shaybani, the Christians of Najrān made an agreement to pay Muhammad an annual tribute of 2,000 pieces of clothing, in return for which they were promised protection. The agreement was renewed under the caliphs Abū Bakr and Umar ibn al-Khattab. In 641, however, the Christians of Najrān were accused of usury and ordered to leave the city. Under the reign of the Caliph ‘Umar, the Christian community of Najrān was deported to Mesopotamia, where they settled near Kufa in a place they called Najānīya. In the following period, Najrān lost its importance. According to the report of Ibn al-Mujavir, however, Jews and Christians still made up two thirds of the population of Najran in the 13th century.

=== Former Jewish community ===
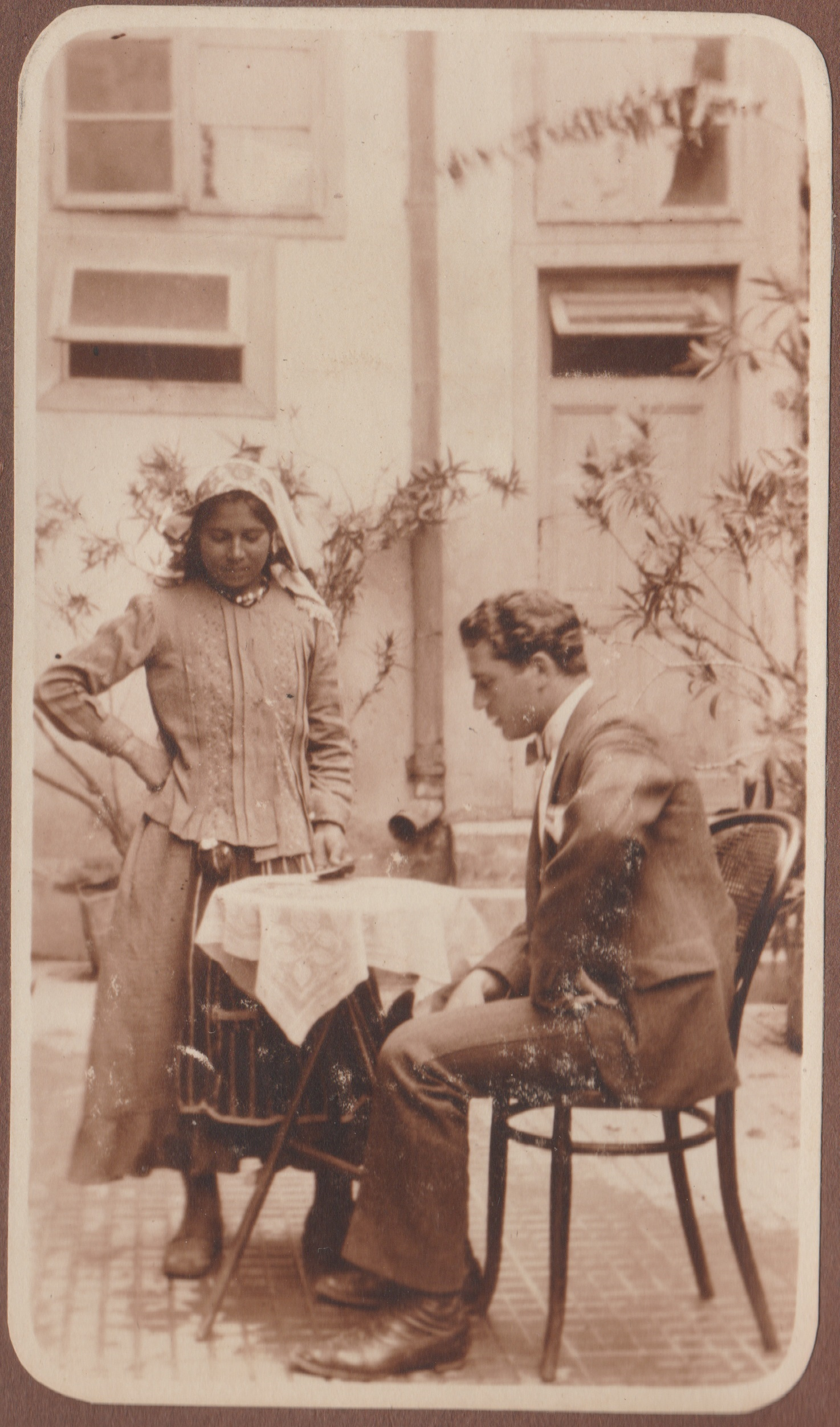
Rabbi Salomon Halevi (Last Rabbi of Madras Synagogue) and his wife Rebecca Cohen (Najran Jew), Paradesi Jews of Madras

Najrān had a Jewish community dating back to pre-Islamic times, historically affiliated with the Banu al-Harith, who were Yemenite Jews that had conquered the city and ruled until the Christian invasion of Yemen. With the Saudi conquest of Najrān in 1934, persecution increased, and some 200 Jews of Najrān fled south to Aden between September and October 1949. The Saudi king ibn Saud demanded their return, but the Yemeni king Aḥmad bin Yaḥyá refused because these refugees were Yemenite Jews. After settling in the Ḥashid Camp (also called Mahane Geula) they were airlifted to Israel as part of the larger Operation Magic Carpet.

Some groups of Najrān Jews escaped to Cochin, as they had a very good relationship with its rulers and maintained trade connections with Paradesi Jews.

=== Issues with the Ismaili community ===
The Ismailis, a religious and ethnic minority with historic roots in Najrān Province of southwestern Saudi Arabia, face increasing threats to their identity as a result of official discrimination. Official discrimination in Saudi Arabia against Ismāʻīlīs encompasses government employment, religious practices, and the justice system. Government officials exclude Ismāʻīlīs from decision making and publicly disparage their faith.

With the arrival of Mishʻal bin Suʻūd as the governor of Najrān in 1996, tensions between local authorities and the Ismaʻili population increased, culminating in a watershed confrontation between armed Ismaʻili demonstrators and police and army units outside Najrān's Holiday Inn hotel on April 23, 2000. Three months earlier, police had closed all Tayyibi Ismaʻili mosques on a religious holiday. On April 23, after security forces and religious morality police arrested an Ismāʻīlī cleric, a large demonstration took place outside the Holiday Inn, where Governor Mishʻal resided. After the governor refused for hours to meet the petitioners, an exchange of fire between security forces and armed demonstrators left two Ismāʻīlīs dead and, according to some government accounts, killed one policeman as well. Believing their religious identity to be under attack, Ismāʻili men erected defences around Khushaywah, the seat of the Ismaʻili religious leader Da'i al-Mutlaq. Khushaywah, which includes the Manṣūrah Mosque complex, was also the spiritual capital of Sulaymani Ismaʻilis, a community with followers in India and Pakistan as well as Saudi Arabia and Yemen. The army surrounded the Ismaʻili positions and placed the city under its control. The standoff ended later the same day without further bloodshed.

== Population ==
Historical population
Year	Pop.	±% p.a.
1992	300,994	—
2004	420,345	+2.82%
2010	507,106	+3.18%
2018	595,705	+2.03%
2022	592,300	−0.14%

== Governorates ==
Map of Najran Province

Najran Province comprises six governorates, with Najran serving as the seat of the province. The governorates are categorized into Category A and Category B based on the availability of services. The province had seven governorates until 2014, when Al-Kharkhir Governorate was abolished and merged into Sharurah Governorate.

Seat
Governorate (A)
Governorate (B)

#	Governorate	2010 Census	2022 Census
–	Najran	–	421,902
1	Sharurah	–	100,199
2	Habona	–	24,823
3	Thar	–	13,391
4	Yadamah	–	16,160
5	Badr Al-Janub	–	7,991
6	Khubash	–	7,834

== Provincial government ==
The province is governed by a governor (Emir) appointed by the King of Saudi Arabia, assisted by a deputy governor.

Governor	Term of Office	Monarch(s)
Office established
Turki Al-Madi	1934 – 1952	Abdulaziz
Hamad Al-Madi	1952 – 1954	Abdulaziz, Saud
Ali bin Mubarak (Acting)	1954	Saud
Ibrahim Al-Nashmi	1955 – 1962	Saud
Khalid bin Ahmed	1962 – 1979	Saud, Faisal, Khalid
Fahd bin Khalid	1979 – 1997	Khalid, Fahd
Mishaal bin Saud	1997 – 2008	Fahd, Abdullah
Mishaal bin Abdullah	2009 – 2013	Abdullah
Jiluwi bin Abdulaziz	2014 – present	Abdullah, Salman

== Transportation ==
Najran Province is served by two airports: Najran Regional Airport, located in Najran, which serves as the province’s main airport, and Sharurah Domestic Airport in Sharurah, serving the province’s largest governorate.

== Religious groups ==
Najran, a fertile valley in what is now southwestern Saudi Arabia at the foot of mountains bordering the vast stretch of desert known as the Empty Quarter, was traditionally home to Christian and Jewish communities, in addition to Sulaymani Ismailis and Zaidis. Christians have been absent from Najran for some centuries, and the remaining Jewish community is Yemenite Jews that migrated to Najran and have left in 1949, following the establishment of the state of Israel. Najran's Zaidi community in 2008 numbers around 2,000.

The 2004 Saudi census put the number of inhabitants in Najran at around 408,000. Sulaymani Ismailis, widely believed to constitute a large majority of the Najrani population, share an identity based on historical, cultural, and religious roots. In Najran city, the Khushaiwa compound, with its Mansura mosque complex, is the spiritual capital of the Sulaymani branch of the Ismaili sect, one of two major strands of contemporary Ismailism. Most Ismailis in Najran belong to one of two tribes: Yam and the Hamdan. There are also some Sunnis of the Yam tribe, both recent converts as well as those who have adhered to Sunni Islam for centuries.

=== Ancient Christian community ===
Najran is known for being home to an ancient settlement of Christians in the Arabian peninsula. They signed the "Najran Pact" in the 7th century with the Islamic prophet, Muhammad, promising them fair treatment as "protected subjects" (dhimmi) of the newly conquered territories. The village is now abandoned.

== Sports ==
Najran Province is home to four football clubs, with the main venue being Prince Hathloul bin Abdulaziz Sports City Stadium. Al-Okhdood Club, based in Najran, and Sharurah Club, based in Sharurah, were founded in 1976. Najran S.FC, also based in Najran, was founded in 1978. Habona Club, based in Habona, was founded in 1994.

== See also ==
- Provinces of Saudi Arabia
- List of governorates of Saudi Arabia
- List of cities and towns in Saudi Arabia
