= Rakan bin Hithlain =

Arabian prince (1814–1892)

Rakan bin Falah bin Hithlain
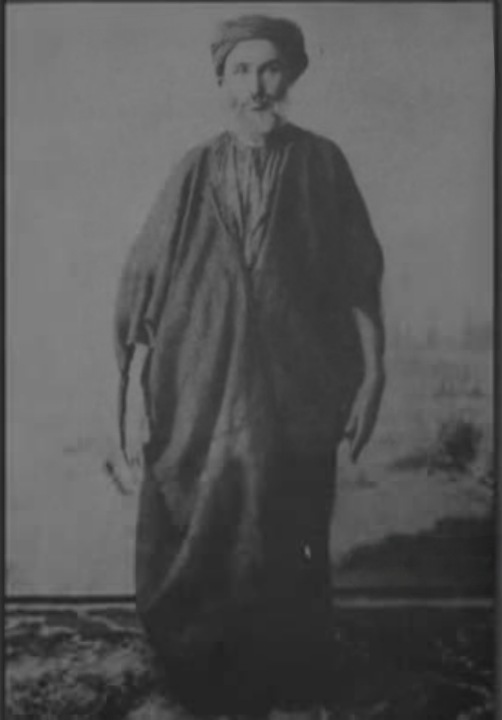
- Sheikh of the Ajman tribe: 1859 – 1892
- Predecessor: Falah bin Rakan bin Hathleen
- Born: 1814
- Died: 1892 (aged 77–78)
- House: Al Hithlain
- Father: Falah bin Mani bin Hithlain
- Religion: Islam
- Occupation: Knight, Poet, and Sheikh

Rakan bin Falah bin Mani’ bin Hathleen Al-Ajmi (c. 1814–1892), also known as Abu Falah, was a prince, poet, warrior, and leader of the Ajman tribe. His father, Falah bin Hethlin, who was a sheikh, was killed in 1845 and succeeded by Falah's brother Hizam as the tribe's leader. When Hizam abdicated due to old age in 1859, Rakan became the sheikh of the Ajman tribe. Rakan was imprisoned in the city of Niš in Serbia while it was affiliated with the Ottoman Empire during the Serbian–Ottoman Wars (1876–1878), and he participated in a battle between the Serbians and the Ottomans during his imprisonment.

== Marriage ==
Rakan fell in love with a daughter of Amer bin Jafn Al Safran whose name is unknown. He wrote a love poem for her. Upon hearing the composition, Rakan's father arranged a betrothal between Rakan and the young woman. Amer bin Jafn agreed to the marriage. The couple had a child named Falah bin Rakan bin Hathleen.

== Leadership ==
Rakah's father Falah bin Hethlin was killed in 1845. Falah's brother Hizam bin Hethlin succeeded him in the leadership of the tribe. Hizam spent about fifteen years as the leader of the Ajman tribe, then relinquished his leadership in 1859 to Rakan because of his old age. Rakan was 46 years old when he assumed leadership of the tribe.

== Arrest ==
The Ottomans became aware of Rakan's power in Al-Ahsa after the spread of his forces and influence in the region. Rakan was captured after a battle. One source mentions the capture took place after 1882, but this contradicts the evidence of his participation in the Serbian–Turkish war while he was imprisoned in Niš in 1878.

The Ottomans tracked Rakan's movements. At the beginning of the month of Dhul-Hijjah in 1288 AH, Rakan camped with about 400 men near the city of Hofuf at a water well called Ain al-Sulaimani asteroid. The following day, Ottomans killed about 100 men from Ajman and captured Rakan and 30 other men, who they brought to Hofuf and placed in Kut prison.

The Ottoman governor in Al-Ahsa placed Rakan with him in the governor's castle and put him under surveillance. The governor allowed Rakan to attend the governor's council, but on the day of Eid al-Adha (the tenth of Dhul-Hijjah) he instructed his men to surprise Rakan while he was in the council by placing handcuffs around his neck and hands. The governor issued a message requesting any person owing Rakan more than 10 French riyals to announce themselves before the beginning of the new Hijri year and to return the money to him, otherwise the reports would not be considered.

According to the second account, Rakan was imposing on the Ottoman Empire at Kharjah, in order to provide safety for its trade convoys that were traveling between the Arab tribes. This was inconvenient to the Ottoman leaders, so they planned with the person responsible for the delivery of Kharjah to Rakan to arrest him. In one year, the Ajman tribe left to the land. When they settled, Rakan went with six others to the official to agree to receive Kharjah. The Ottomans arrested Rakan and those with him with a trick. They then sent him by sea to the capital of the Ottoman Empire, Istanbul, before exiling him to a castle in Niš for a period of no less than seven years.

== Banishment to Serbia ==
Rakan was imprisoned in Niš, Serbia, which belonged to the Ottomans. He may have been imprisoned in Istanbul, the capital of the Ottoman Empire, as a stopover during his transfer west to Niš. Historians agree Rakan participated in the Serbian–Turkish War (1876–1878) in Niš.

Ibn Firdous mentioned that the Ottomans appointed servants for Rakan including somebody who would make him coffee, among whom was Hamza al-Othmani. Hamza was an Ottoman officer responsible for Rakan; he treated him well, and a friendship developed between them.

== Duel with the Serbian knight ==
During the imprisonment of Rakan, there was a battle between the Serbs and the Ottomans. The Serbs' army contained a huge black-armored knight, and between the two armies was a large trench. The Serbian knight was jumping on horseback to the Ottomans' side, killing Ottomans for four days from the beginning of the battle.

Rakan, following the battle from the roof of the prison, called Hamza to have him inform the governor that he could kill the Serbian knight. Hamza informed the governor, but the governor refused as Rakan was thin and of short stature. The battle continued and the Serbian knight was wreaking havoc, so again Rakan sent to Hamza, who told the governor that Rakan still insisted on fighting the black knight. The governor met with Rakan and agreed to let him go into battle. Rakan chose and trained a horse, then defeated the Serbian knight. Ultimately, the Ottomans won the battle.

There is disagreement over the character of the Serbian knight. Some sources mention that this knight was originally from Moscow and that he is known as the commander "Anatoly the Muscovite", or "a slave of the ceiling".

== Release from prison ==
A pardon was issued by Sultan Abdul Hamid II for Rakan, and the Ottomans released him in 1877. They awarded him the Order of Courage. They offered to have him stay with them and raise his status and give him a position, but he preferred to return to his tribe. They brought him back by sea to the Arabian Peninsula, then bought him a camel and placed his equipment on it and brought him to his family, the Ajman tribe.

Rakan returned as the leader of the Ajman tribe, and the Ottomans arranged for him a monthly salary of 400 piasters starting from 1292 AH until his death in 1314 AH as a token of thanks. After his death, the salary was transferred to his son Falah.

According to Zekeriya Kurşun, a professor at the History Department at Marmara University in Turkey who specializes in the modern history of the Middle East, Rakan exaggerated his story in his poems.

In some sources, Rakan went and handed a captive to the Turkish governor, who said to him, "You did a deed that no one else did, and we won by the grace of God and then thanks to you." He summoned the governor who had experience in the regions, and he believed that Al-Dahna and Al-Suman were from the capitals of the country. They told him that “Al-Dahna” is a sandy land with many trees and is a pasture for the livestock of the desert, and “Al-Suman” is a rocky land, a pasture for livestock in the springtime. When he knew that, he said to him: We gave you what you asked with what we will give you of gifts and money.

== Death ==
Rakan died in 1892 at the age of 77 or 78. Other sources mention that he died in Shawwal in the year 1314 AH/1897 CE, in reference to the last salary that the Ottomans paid him.
