= Thar, Najran =

City and Governorate in Najran Province, Saudi Arabia

Thar ثار
- City and Governorate
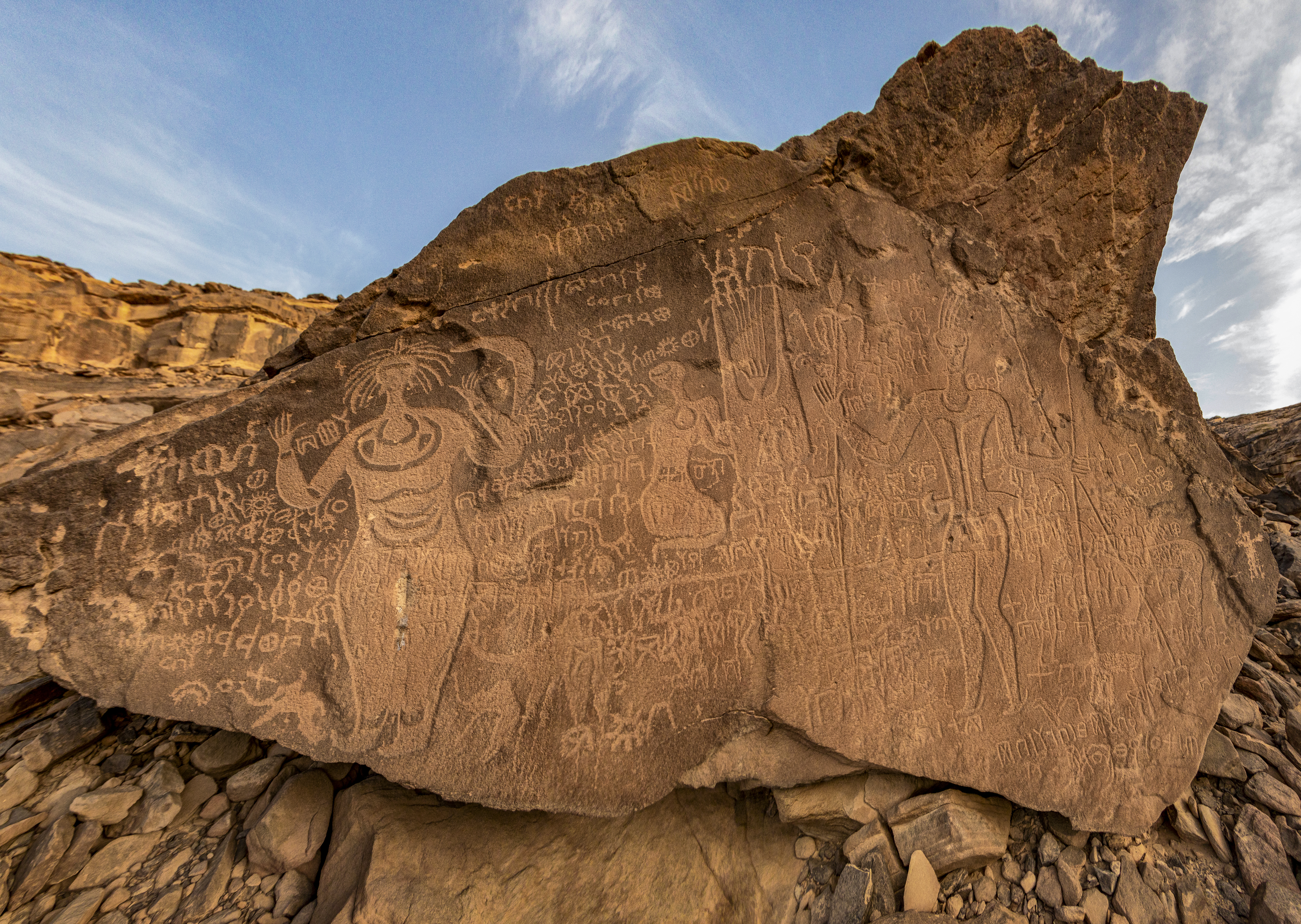
- "Inscription of the Dancers" at Bir Hima Rock Petroglyphs and Inscriptions in Thar

- Location of Thar within Najran Province

- Location of Thar within Saudi Arabia
- Coordinates: 17°16′N 44°08′E
- Country: Saudi Arabia
- Province: Najran Province
- Region: South Arabia
- Seat: Thar

Government
  - Type: Municipality
  - Body: Thar Municipality

Population (2022)
  - Metro: 13,391 (Thar Governorate)
- Time zone: UTC+03:00 (SAST)
- Area code: 017

Thar (Arabic: ثار) is a city and governorate in Najran Province, southern Saudi Arabia. It is administered by the Thar Municipality.

== Archaeological sites ==
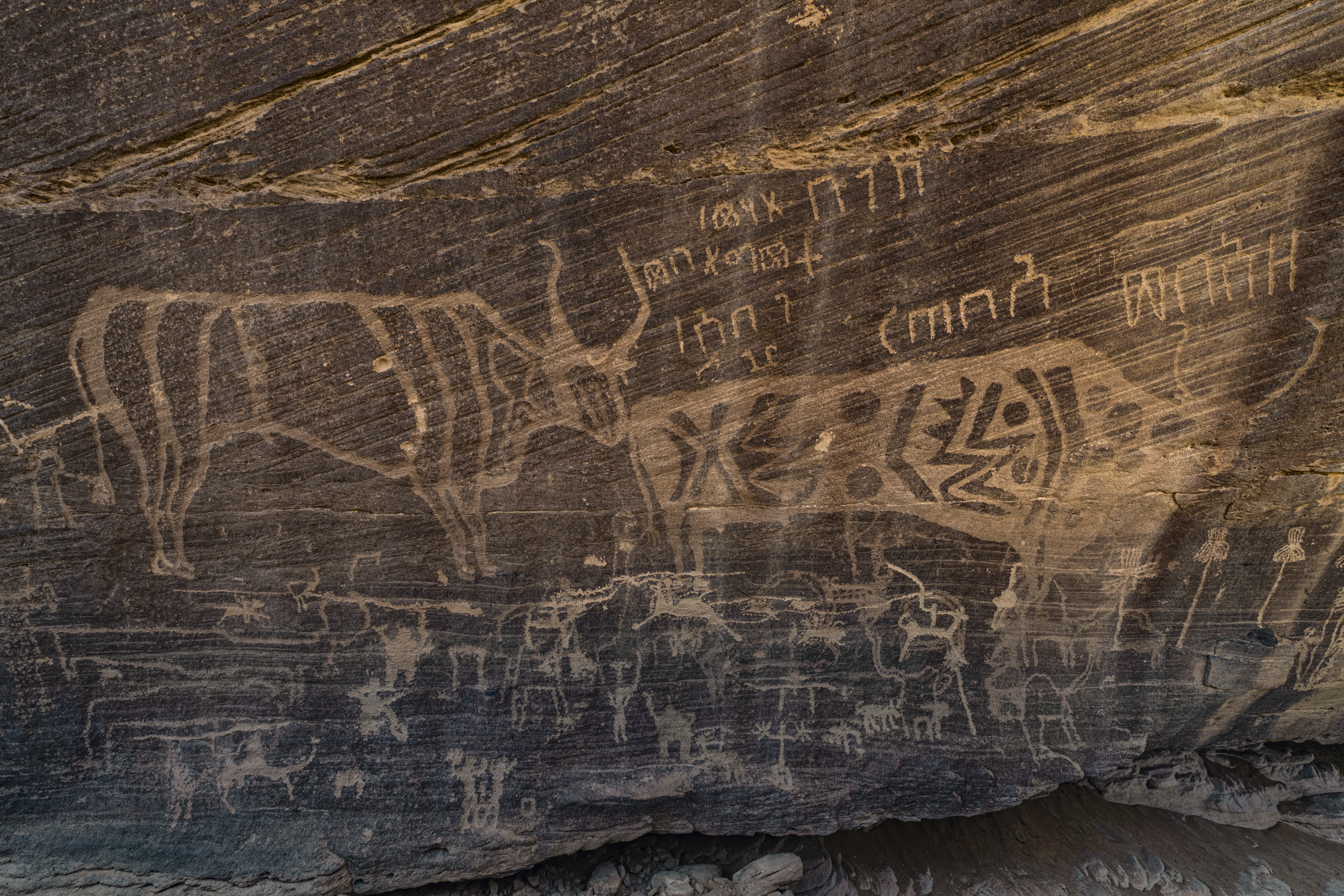
Inscriptions of Minshaf at Bir Hima Rock Petroglyphs and Inscriptions in Thar

Thar is home to the Bir Hima Rock Petroglyphs and Inscriptions, an important prehistoric site about 120 km north of Najran City. The area was inhabited during the Paleolithic and Neolithic periods, with the Bir Hima Complex dating from roughly 7000 BC to 1000 BC. In July 2021, it was recognized as part of the Hima Cultural Area UNESCO World Heritage Site.

== Subdivisions ==
Thar has five subdivisions (markaz):

- Qatan
- Al-Saffah
- Al-Ain and Al-Qareen
- Tala'
- Hima

== See also ==
- Provinces of Saudi Arabia
- List of governorates of Saudi Arabia
- List of cities and towns in Saudi Arabia
