= Al Kharjah =

Coordinates: 21.0828°N 40.7189°E

Al Kharjah, Saudi Arabia, is an oasis located at longitude 40.7189 east, latitude 21.0828 north.

== Location ==
The oasis is located midway between Taaf and Maysaan, in Makkah Province.

== Climate ==
The climate of Al Kharjah is arid and is classified as BWh in the Köppen and Geiger scale. The average annual temperature is 21.1 °C and average annual rainfall is 176 mm though the highest rainfall is in April, with an average of 39mm.

== See also ==
- Al Kharjah, Tunisia
- Al Kharjah, Iraq
- Oasis
