= Habona =

City and Governorate in Najran Province, Saudi Arabia

Habona حبونا
- City and Governorate
- Location of Habona within Najran Province

- Location of Habona within Saudi Arabia
- Coordinates: 17°47′N 44°12′E
- Country: Saudi Arabia
- Province: Najran Province
- Region: South Arabia
- Seat: Habona

Government
  - Type: Municipality
  - Body: Habona Municipality

Area
  - City and Governorate: 2,500 km^{2} (970 sq mi)

Population (2022)
  - Metro: 24,823 (Habona Governorate)
- Time zone: UTC+03:00 (SAST)
- Area code: 017

Habona or Hubuna (Arabic: حبونا) is a city and governorate in Najran Province, southern Saudi Arabia.

== Subdivisions ==
Sharurah has multiple subdivisions (markaz), including:

- Al-Majma‘
- Al-Harshaf
- Salwa, Habona

== See also ==
- Provinces of Saudi Arabia
- List of governorates of Saudi Arabia
- List of cities and towns in Saudi Arabia
