= Badr Al Janub =

City and governorate in Najran Province, Saudi Arabia

Badr Al-Janub بدر الجنوب
- City and Governorate
- Location within Najran Province

- Location within Saudi Arabia
- Coordinates: 17°52′N 43°29′E
- Country: Saudi Arabia
- Province: Najran Province
- Region: South Arabia
- Seat: Badr Al-Janub

Government
  - Type: Municipality
  - Body: Badr Al-Janub Municipality

Area
  - City and Governorate: 4,200 km^{2} (1,600 sq mi)

Population (2022)
  - Metro: 7,991 (Badr Al-Janub Governorate)
- Time zone: UTC+03:00 (SAST)
- Area code: 017

Badr Al-Janub (Arabic: بدر الجنوب) is a city and governorate in the Najran Province of southern Saudi Arabia.

== Subdivisions ==
Badr Al-Janub has five subdivisions (markaz):

- Al-Khanq
- Haddadah
- Al-Rihab
- Ladmah
- Al-Arj

== See also ==
- Provinces of Saudi Arabia
- List of governorates of Saudi Arabia
- List of cities and towns in Saudi Arabia
