= Khubash =

City and Governorate in Najran Province, Saudi Arabia

Khubash خباش
- City and Governorate
- Location within Najran Province

- Location within Saudi Arabia
- Coordinates: 17°20′N 44°44′E
- Country: Saudi Arabia
- Province: Najran Province
- Region: South Arabia
- Seat: Khubash

Population (2022)
  - Metro: 7,834 (Khubash Governorate)
- Time zone: UTC+03:00 (SAST)
- Area code: 017

Khubash (Arabic: خباش) is a city and governorate situated in Najran Province in southern Saudi Arabia.

== Subdivisions ==
Khubash has several subdivisions (markaz):

- Al-Khadra
- Abu Shaddad
- Al-Naqayha
- Umm al-Waht
- Al-Mahyash
- Huwaymil

== See also ==
- Provinces of Saudi Arabia
- List of governorates of Saudi Arabia
- List of cities and towns in Saudi Arabia
