= Sulaymani =

Tayyibi Isma'ili branch of Yemen, India, and Pakistan

The Sulaymani branch of Tayyibi Isma'ilism is an Islamic community, of which around 200,000 members reside in Yemen and around 470,000 in Najran, Saudi Arabia, while a few thousand Sulaymani Bohras can be found in India. The Sulaymanis are sometimes headed by a Da'i al-Mutlaq from the Makrami family.

It is not correct to assume that this branch is always headed by someone from the Makrami family, as the Da'i al Mutlaq could be from other families and communities. Examples: the first Da'i was Dhuayb Bin Mousa from the Banu Hamdan, Dawud Bin Ajab Shah was an Indian, Sulayman Bin Al Hassan was an Indian and some of his brothers and sons were Indians. It is true, however, that for the very recent Da'is they have came from the Makrami family.

== History ==
Founded in 1592, the Sulaymanis are mostly concentrated in Yemen but are also found in Pakistan and India. The denomination is named after its 27th Daʻī, Sulayman bin Hassan.

The total number of Sulaymanis currently are around 700,000, mainly living in the eastern district of Jabal Haraz in northwest Yemen and in Najran, Saudi Arabia. Beside the Banu Yam of Najran, the Sulaymanis are in Haraz, among the inhabitants of the Jabal Maghariba and in Hawzan, Lahab and Attara, as well as in the district of Hamadan and in the vicinity of Yarim.

In India there are between 3000 and 5000 Sulaymanis living mainly in Vadodara, Hyderabad, Mumbai and Surat. In Punjab, Pakistan and there is a well-established Sulaymani community in Sindh. Some ten thousand Sulaymanis live in rural areas of Punjab known to the Sulaymani as Jazeera-e Sind; these Sulaymani communities have been in the Jazeera-e Sind from the time of Fatimid Imam-Caliph Al-Mu'izz li-Din Allah when he sent his Daʻīs to Jazeera-e Sind.

There are also some 900–1000 Sulaymanis mainly from South Asia scattered around the world, in the Persian Gulf States, United States, Canada, Thailand, Australia, Japan and the United Kingdom. The Sulaymanis split off from the Tayyibi community, following a succession dispute upon the death of Dawood Bin Ajabshah in 1589. While most of the Tayyibis in India recognised Dawood Bin Qutub as his successor and thus forming the Dawoodi Bohras, the Yemeni community followed Sulayman bin Hassan.

Starting from 1677, Sulayman's successors almost always came from the Makrami family. The da'is made Najran their headquarters and ruled the area, supported by the Banu Yam, until their power waned under the successive rules of the Ottomans and Saudis. The leadership of the Sulaymaniyah, whose Indian community was small, reverted to the Yemen with the succession of the thirtieth Da'i al-Mutlaq, Ibrahim ibn Muhammad ibn Fahd Al-Makrami, in 1677. Since then the position of the dai al mutlaq has remained in various branches of the al Makrami family except for the time of the forty-sixth dai, an Indian.

The Makrami da'is usually resided in Badr in Najran, Saudi Arabia. With the backing of the tribe of the Banu Yam they ruled Najran independently and at times extended their sway over other parts of the Yemen and Arabia until the incorporation of Najran into Saudi Arabia in 1934. The peak of their power was in the time of the thirty-third Da'i al-Mutlaq, Isma'il ibn Hibat Allah (1747–1770), who defeated the Wahhabiyah or Wahhabism in Najd and invaded Hadramawt. He is also known as the author of an esoteric Qur'an commentary, virtually the only religious work of a Sulaymani author published so far. Since Najran came under Saudi rule, the religious activity of the da'is and their followers has been severely restricted. In the Yemen the Sulaymaniyah are found chiefly in the region of Manakha and the Haraz mountains. In India they live mainly in Baroda, Ahmadabad, and Hyderabad and are guided by a representative (mansub) of the Da'i al-Mutlaq residing in Hyderabad, India.

== Sulaymani da'i al-mutlaqs ==
The following is a list of religious leaders (da'i al-mutlaq) of the Sulaymani Isma'ilis. For the 26 predecessors, see List of Dai of Dawoodi Bohra. See Sulayman bin Hassan for more information.

1. Sulayman bin Hassan al-Hindi
2. Ja'far bin Sulayman al-Hindi
3. Muhammad bin al-Fahd al-Makrami
4. Ali bin Sulayman al-Hindi
5. Ibrahim bin Muhammad al-Makrami
6. Muhammad bin Isma'il al-Makrami
7. Hibat-Allah bin Ibrahim al-Makrami
8. Isma'il bin Hibat-Allah al-Makrami
9. Hasan bin Hibat-Allah al-Makrami
10. Abd-al-Ali bin Hasan al-Makrami
11. Abd-Allah bin Ali al-Makrami
12. Yusuf bin Ali al-Makrami
13. Husayn bin Husayn al-Makrami
14. Isma'il bin Muhammad al-Makrami
15. Hasan bin Muhammad al-Makrami
16. Hasan bin Isma'il Shabaam
17. Ahmad bin Isma'il al-Makrami
18. Abd-Allah bin Ali al-Makrami
19. Ali bin Hibat-Allah al-Makrami
20. Ali bin Muhsin Shabaam
21. Ghulam Husayn bin Hazrat Farhat Ali Husami
22. Sharaf-al-Din Husayn bin Ahmad al-Makrami
23. Jamal-al-Din Ali bin Sharaf-al-Din Husayn al-Makrami
24. Sharafi Hasan bin Husayn al-Makrami
25. Husayn bin Isma'il al-Makrami
26. Abdullah bin Muhammad al-Makrami
27. Ahmed bin Ali al-Makrami
28. Ali bin Hāsin al-Makrami

== History of the Imāmī Sūlaymānīs ==
The historical emergence of the Shī‘ah Imāmī Tāyyībī-Mustā‘lī Sūlaymānī-Ismā'īlīs

== See also ==
- Alavi Bohras
- Atba-e-Malak
  - Atba-e-Malak Badar
  - Atba-e-Malak Vakil
- Dawoodi Bohra
- Progressive Dawoodi Bohra
- Hebtiahs Bohra
- Sunni Bohra
- Tyabji family
