= Banu Yam =

Large tribe native to Najran Province

Yam يام
- Hamdanite, Kahlanite, Qahtanite
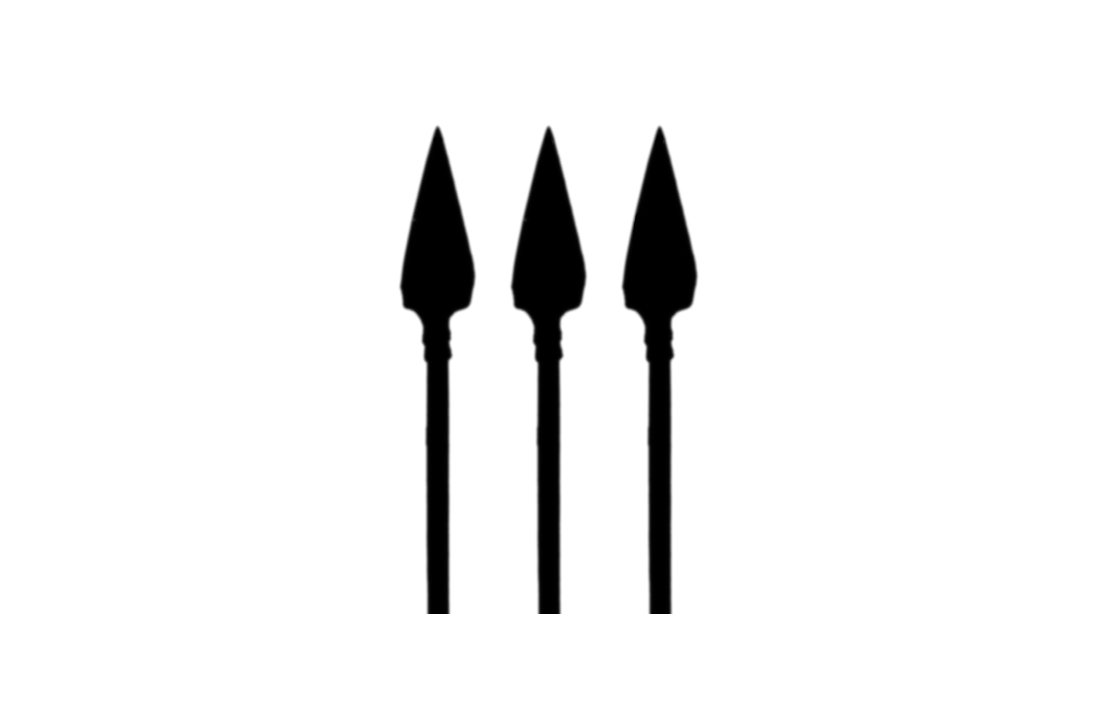
- The flag of the Yam tribe (three spears) during the reign of the Al Yazid dynasty
- Ethnicity: Arab
- Location: Primarily Najran, other parts of Saudi Arabia, Kuwait, United Arab Emirates, Qatar, Bahrain, Yemen, Sultanate of Oman
- Parent tribe: Banu Hashid
- Branches: Banu Murrah; Banu Ajman
- Language: Arabic (Southern Najdi)
- Religion: Sulaymani Islam (Najran and surrounding areas); Sunni Islam (Other lands like in Eastern Province and surrounding areas like Nejd and Northern Najran such Yadamah and the tribes that live there, such as the Banu Ajman, Banu Murrah, and other Banu Yam Tribes

Banu Yam (Arabic: بنو يام, Banū Yām) is an Arabian tribe that belongs to the Qahtanite branch of Arabian tribes, specifically the group known as Banu Hamdan, and are, therefore, native to southwestern Arabia.

Their traditional way of life was well suited to life in the Arabian Desert and East Saharo-Arabian xeric shrublands they once lived in. Most have moved into small villages and given up their previous nomadic way of life. The tribe of Yam was also the progenitor of two other important tribes: the Al Murrah and the 'Ujman of eastern Saudi Arabia and the Persian Gulf coast.

The Yam are notable among the tribes of Saudi Arabia for the majority of its members who follow the small Sulaymani Isma'ili branch of Shi'ite Islam. Religious leadership is currently in the hands of the al-Makrami clan, who joined Yam through alliance some time in the 17th century. Most Yam in Najran are Isma’ili while the Al-Ajman and Al Murrah and other Banu Yam branches who can be found in Saudi Arabia, Kuwait, Qatar, Bahrain are Sunni. Members of the tribe can be found throughout Saudi Arabia due to migration, particularly the areas around Jeddah and Dammam. Unlike some other tribes of southwestern Saudi Arabia, Yam have traditionally had a large bedouin section, due to the proximity of their territories to the formidable desert known as the Empty Quarter.

They are also different from some of their neighboring tribes in that they are recorded to have repeatedly raided the neighboring region of Najd, reaching as far north as Dhruma near Riyadh during the time of the First Saudi State in 1775, and causing much panic.

The Yam's home province of Najran.

== See also ==
- Bani Yas
- Bani Hareth
- Banu Thaqif
- Al Saud
- Al Maktoum
- House of Al-Falasi
