= Ajman (tribe) =

Arabian tribal confederation

Ajman العجمان
- Banu Yam tribe
- Ethnicity: Arabs
- Nisba: al-’Ajmī
- Location: Saudi Arabia; United Arab Emirates; Kuwait; Qatar; Bahrain
- Language: Arabic
- Religion: Islam

Al-Ajman or al-'Ijman (Arabic: العُجمان, singular Ajmi Arabic: العجمي) is an Arabian tribal confederation in the Arabian Peninsula, with Ajman spread across Saudi Arabia, Qatar, the United Arab Emirates and Kuwait.

== Origin ==
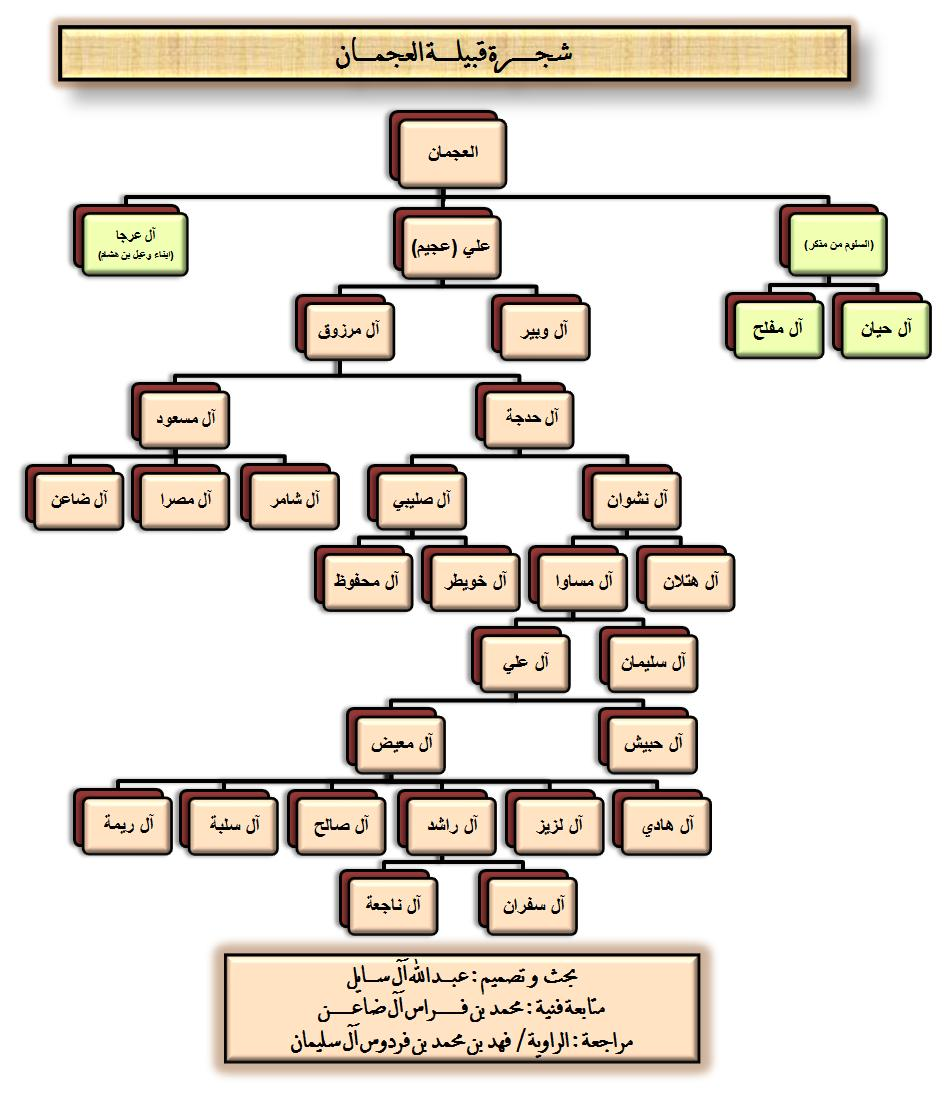
Ajman branches

Al-Ajman is a Qahtanite Arab tribe that is descended from Banu Yam tribe. Most of Ajman left their nomadic life and lived in northeastern of Saudi Arabia.

== History ==
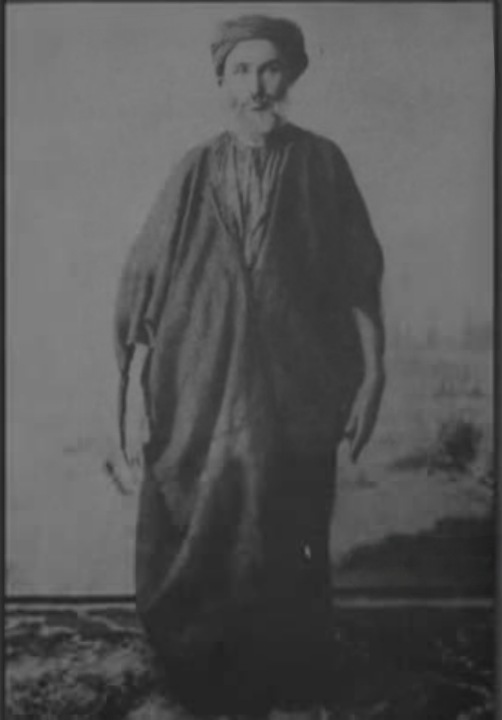
Photo from the Ottoman archive Rakan bin Hithlain after his release from prison

The Ajman were noted for being important players in the politics of eastern Arabia in the 18th and early 20th centuries. Their most famous leader (or sheikh) during the 19th-20th century was Rakan bin Hithlain, who is still well known in Arabian tribal lore. He was noted for his poetry and is often known as the maternal grandfather of the current Crown Prince of Saudi Arabia Mohammed bin Salman. In 1861 the Ajman were defeated by Faisal bin Turki, the Imam of the Second Saudi State, after challenging his rule in the 1850s. Faisal bin Turki later married into the tribe. Later they supported the cause of the Saud Al Kabir branch of the Al Saud against their cousin Abdulaziz bin Saud, the founder of Saudi Arabia.

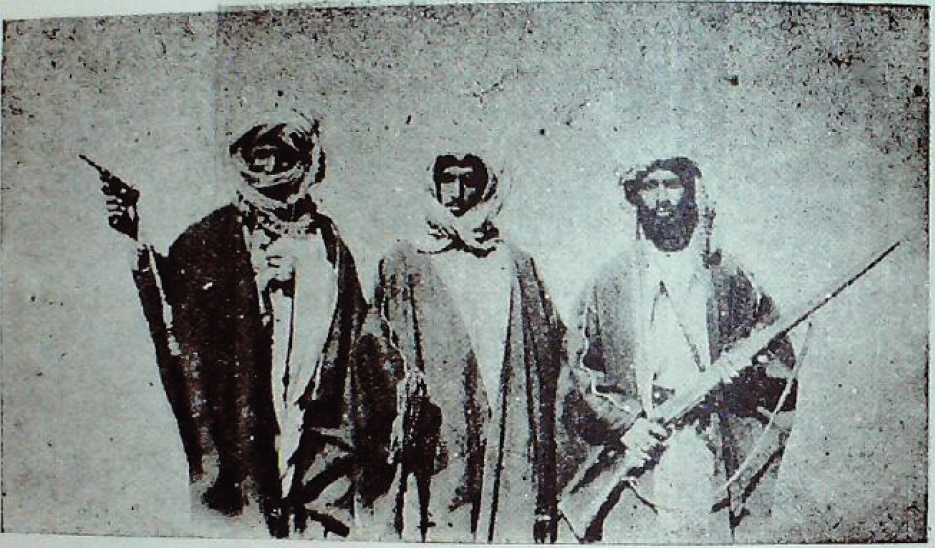
Dhaidan ibn Hathlin is in the middle of the picture

A section of the Ajman led by Dhaydan bin Hithlain joined the Ikhwan movement in 1900, providing military support for Ibn Saud, but later rebelled against him. The Ajman and their allies from the tribes of Utaybah and Mutayr were defeated by Ibn Saud in 1929 in the Battle of Sabilla, which put an end to the Ikhwan rebellion.

Nearly all the Ajman have abandoned nomadic life and have settled in the Persian Gulf states, particularly in the Eastern Province of Saudi Arabia. Their main tribal territory is known as Wadi Al-Ajman ("the valley of the Ajman"), spanning Al Nairyah governorate to the town of Judah.

It is disputed whether the Emirate of Ajman in the United Arab Emirates is named after the tribe of Ajman or the Ajam (Persians).

== Language ==
The Ajman tribe, alongside their cousin tribe Al-Murrah, have an Arabic dialect that is part of the southern Najdi group. This dialect group is characteristic of Banu Yam, the parent tribe of Ajman. The tribe's dialect differs from neighboring east Arabian bedouins, such as Bani Khalid and Mutair, as it possesses some south Arabian features like the "-ish" feminine suffix.
