= Al Murrah =

Arab tribe

Al Murrah آل مرة
- Arab tribe
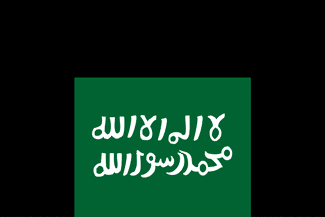
- Ethnicity: Arab
- Location: Arabian Peninsula; Saudi Arabia; Qatar; United Arab Emirates; Kuwait; Bahrain
- Descended from: Banu Yam
- Language: Arabic
- Religion: Islam

The Al Murrah (Arabic: آل مرة) (singular 'Al Marri') are an Arab tribe descended from the Banu Yam tribe. They mainly reside in countries such as Qatar, Saudi Arabia, United Arab Emirates, Kuwait and Bahrain. Historically, the Al Murrah were a tribe of camel-herding nomads, who controlled and travelled through a vast area of the Arabian Peninsula.

Seven clans make up the Saudi branch of the Al Murrah. Travelling as much as 3,000 kilometres (1,900 mi) each year, the tribe comprises approximately 15,000 individuals.

== Population ==
=== Qatar ===
Historically, the Al Murrah tribe made up a large proportion of Qatar's ethnic population.

In 1885, a number of Al Murrah tribespeople, along with several members from the Bani Hajer tribe, renounced their allegiance to Qatar and departed from the country. The two families were joined by the Ajman tribe, who were known to harbor hostilities toward Qatar and regularly engage in skirmishes with its inhabitants. While the group was encamped in an area between Qatar and Oman, a regiment of 1,200 partisans composed of branches of Al Murrah and Bani Hajer loyal to the sheikh of Qatar engaged the group. Although the three tribes boasted a combined force of 2,000 men and outnumbered the opposition, they were inflicted with heavy losses.

A majority of tribe members were strong supporters of Sheikh Khalifa Al Thani, the former Emir of Qatar who was deposed in 1995 in a coup by his son. Eight months after the coup, 119 Al Murrah members attempted to overthrow the new Emir of Qatar, Sheikh Hamad Al Thani, but failed. In February 2000, 19 of the alleged perpetrators were sentenced to death, 33 were sentenced to life in prison, and the rest were acquitted. However, none of those sentenced to death were executed.

In 2017, Qatar revoked the citizenship of the sheikh and 54 tribespeople. The Al Murrah are friendly to the UAE and Saudi Arabia and oppose the current regime in Iran.

Al Murrah tribespeople were not allowed to run for the 2021 Qatari general election, which led to protests.
