= Al-Fakhri Abdullah =

Da'i al-Mutlaq of Ismaili Sulaymanis

Al-Fakhrī Ad Dai' Sayyadna ‘Abdullāh ibn Muhammad bin Husain al-Makrami was the 52nd Da'i al-Mutlaq of Ismaili Sulaymanis.

Al-Fakhrī Ad Dai' Sayyadna ‘Abdullāh ibn Muhammad bin Husain al-Makrami died on 7 April 2015.
