= Yadamah =

City and Governorate in Najran Province, Saudi Arabia

Yadamah يدمة
- City and Governorate
- Location within Najran Province

- Location within Saudi Arabia
- Coordinates: 18°50′N 44°40′E
- Country: Saudi Arabia
- Province: Najran Province
- Region: South Arabia
- Seat: Yadamah

Government
  - Type: Municipality
  - Body: Yadamah Municipality

Area
  - City and Governorate: 11,980 km^{2} (4,630 sq mi)

Population (2022)
  - Metro: 16,160 (Yadamah Governorate)
- Time zone: UTC+03:00 (SAST)
- Area code: 017

Yadamah is a city and governorate located in Najran Province in southern Saudi Arabia.

== Protected area ==
Yadmah encompasses a significant portion of the 'Uruq Bani Ma'arid Protected Area, which also extends into the Al-Sulayyil Governorate in Riyadh Province. The area is historically notable as part of the natural range of the Arabian oryx, a species that became extinct in the wild during the 20th century.

The reserve has since been selected as a key site for the reintroduction of the Arabian oryx through established captive breeding programmes. In addition, it has been identified as suitable habitat for the restoration of other species that historically inhabited the region.

On 20 September 2023, the Kingdom of Saudi Arabia successfully inscribed the Uruq Bani Ma'arid Protected Area on the UNESCO World Heritage Sites, marking it as the country’s first natural World Heritage Site.

== Subdivisions ==
Yadamah has multiple subdivisions (markaz), including:

- Al-Aziziyah
- Umm Aneeq
- Al-Lijam
- Sultana
- Al-Arf
- Wasat
- Al-Wajid
- Al-Sahan
- Al-Sulai‘a
- Al-Jufrah and Al-Kawkab
- Al-Mashqah
- Na‘wan
- Al-Zumlah
- Al-Salihiyah
- Manadi
- Al-Mandafin
- Sudair Center

== See also ==
- Provinces of Saudi Arabia
- List of governorates of Saudi Arabia
- List of cities and towns in Saudi Arabia
