= Al Kharjah, Tunisia =

River valley in Tunisia

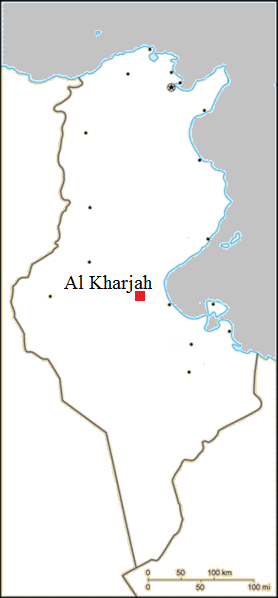
Map showing Al Kharjah, Tunisia.

Al Kharjah, Tunisia is a wadi in Gabes Governorate, Tunisia.

The wadi is also known as Oued Beni Aissa, and is located at 33°48'0"N and 9°46'60"E. It is located at an elevation of 55-61 meters above sea level. The predominant land use is nomadic pastoralism.
