= Ja 1028 =

Sabaic inscription

Ja 1028 is a Sabaic inscription dating to the late Himyarite Kingdom. It was commissioned by an army commander of Dhu Nuwas named S²rḥʾl Yqbl in which he celebrated massacring the Christian community of Najran and the burning of their church with the army in a move against the Abyssinian Christians of the Kingdom of Aksum based in Ethiopia.

The inscription was discovered at Bir Hima, a rock art site 85 km northeast of Najran. Along with Ry 507 and Ry 508, it is one of three inscriptions that describe the Himyarite persecution of Najran's Christians.

== Text ==
The following translation follows that of the Corpus of South Arabian Inscriptions:

1 Might, the God, to whom belong the heavens and the earth, bless the king Yusuf ʾs¹ʾr Yṯʾr, the king of all the tribes, and might [God] bless the qayls [commanders] …

2 Lḥyʿt Yrḫm, S¹myfʿ ʾs²wʿ, S²rḥʾl Yqbl [Sharaḥʾīl Yaqbul dhu-Yazʾan], S²rḥbʾl ʾs¹ʿd, the sons of S²rḥbʾl Ykml, of the clan of Yzʾn and Gdnm,

3 the supporters of their lord, the king Yusuf ʾs¹ʾr Yṯʾr, when he burnt the church, killed the Abyssinians in Ẓafār, and moved a war against ʾs²ʿrn, Rkbn, Fr–

4 s¹n, and Mḫwn, and brought the war (against) the defence of Nagrān. He reinforced the chain of Mandab, they were with him. And he sent them with an army. What the king has managed

5 to get in this expedition as spoils, amounted to twelve thousand deaths, eleven thousand prisoners, two

6 hundred ninety thousand camels, cows and small animals.102 This inscription was written by the qayl S²rḥʾl Yqbl of Yzʾn, when he was in guard against Nagrān

7 with the tribe of Hamdān, citizens and nomads, and the assault troops of ʾzʾnn and the Arabs [ʾʿrb] of Kinda, Murād, Madhḥig, while the qayls, his brothers, with the king, were mounting guard

8 on the coast against the Abyssinians, while they were reinforcing the chain of Mandab. That is all what they mentioned in this inscription: deaths, boot[y], garrison service and all (what happened) in only one expedition;

9 then they came back to their houses thirteen months later. Might Rḥmnn bless their sons S²rḥbʾl Ykml and Hʿn ʾs¹ʾr, the sons of Lḥyʿt

10 and Lḥyʿt Yrḫm, the son of S¹myfʿ, and Mrṯdʾln Ymgd, the son of S²rḥʾl, of the clan of Yzʾn. The month of Mḏrʾn of the six hundred

11 thirty-three [523ce]. For the protection of the heavens and the earth and of the strength of the men was this inscription against those who would harm and degrade. Might Rḥmnn, the Highest,

12 protect it against all those who would degrade. This inscription was placed, written, executed in the name of Rḥmnn. Tmm of Ḥḍyt placed. By the Lord of Jews. By the Highly Praised.

== Interpretation and significance ==
Ja 1028 is a local Himyarite document that discusses the massacre of the Christians of Najran. According to Ja 1028, this massacre was related to the war against the Kingdom of Aksum and constituted a defense of Judaism. The event then led to the Aksumite invasion of Himyar.

The inscription invokes God using by name Rahmanan, a typical personal name for since the Himyarite conversion to Judaism from polytheism. Related inscriptions, particularly Ry 507 and Ry 508, use similar language: the protection of the heavens and Earth, the protection of Rahmanan, and associating Rahmanan with the heavens and Earth. Rahmanan being called the "Lord of the Jews" is also in Ry 515, contemporary to Ja 1028.

In Ja 108 and Ry 515, two names are used for God: (1) Rb-hwd b-Rḥmnn, 'Lord of the Jews by/with Rahmanan' and (2) Rb-hd b-Mḥmd: 'Lord of Jews by / with (?) the Praised'. The language (also seen in CIH 543) has given rise to speculation about whether one or two gods (the God of Israel, and the local Himyarite deity) may have been intended. New evidence from the Jabal Dabub inscription suggests a direct identification between the Israelite and Himyarite god.

== See also ==
- DJE 23
- Judaism in pre-Islamic Arabia
