= Bir Hima Rock Petroglyphs and Inscriptions =

Ancient settlement in Saudi Arabia

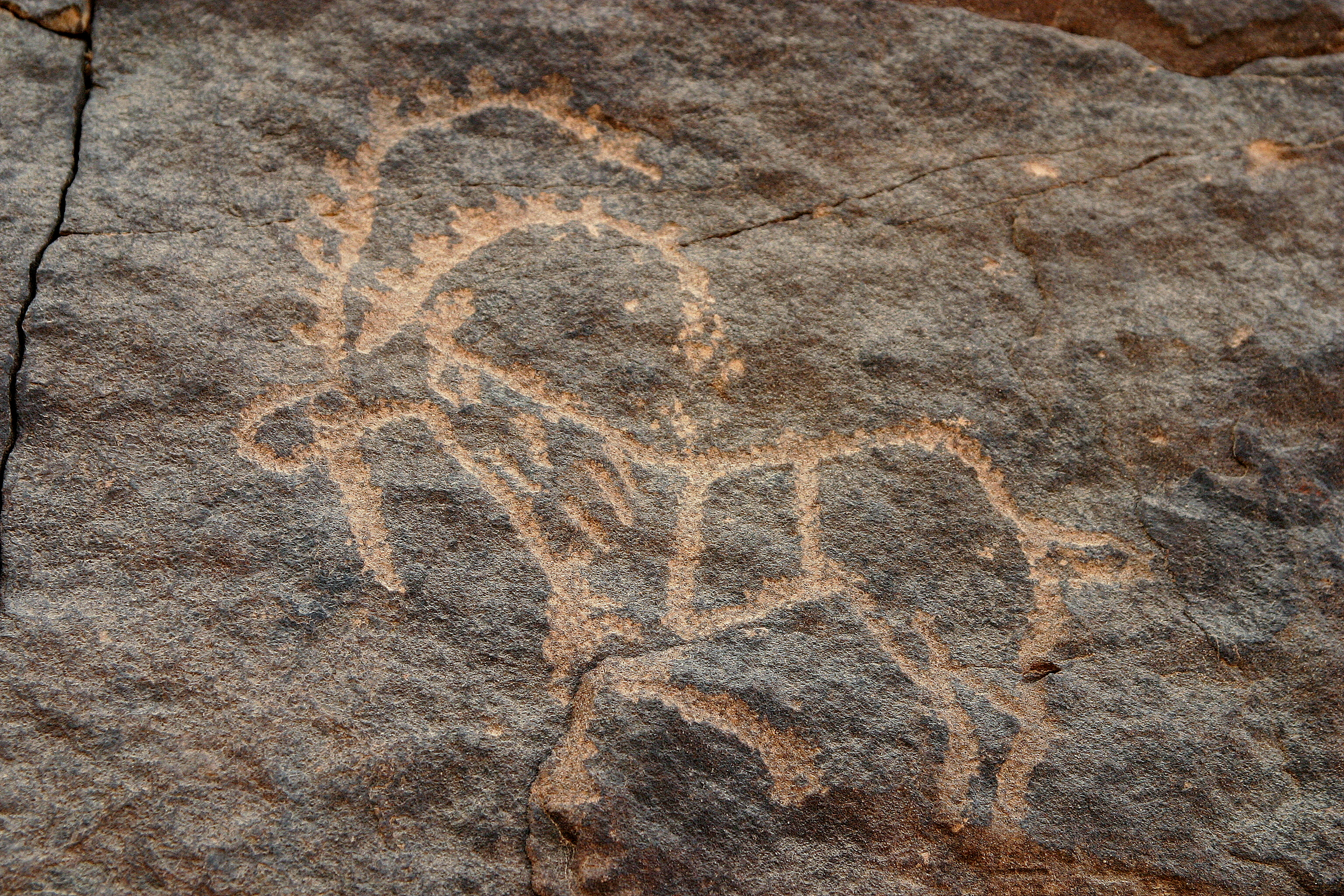
- Petroglyph at Bir Hima in Saudi Arabia

- Location within Saudi Arabia
- 18°14′55″N 44°27′06″E
- Location: Najran, Najran Province, Saudi Arabia

Site notes
- Owner: Department of Antiquities, Saudi Arabia

UNESCO World Heritage Site
- Official name: Ḥimā Cultural Area
- Type: Cultural
- Criteria: (iii)
- Designated: 2021 (44th session)
- Reference no.: 1619

Bir Hima (Arabic: بئر حما) is a rock art site in Najran province, in southwest Saudi Arabia, about 120 kilometres (75 mi) north of the city of Najran. An ancient site of Prehistoric Arabia, it was settled during the Paleolithic and Neolithic periods, with the Bir Hima Complex covering the time period of 7000–1000 BC. Bir Hima contains numerous troughs whose type is similar from North Arabia to Yemen.

It was designated as part of the Hima Cultural Area UNESCO World Heritage Site in July 2021. 'Uruq Bani Ma'arid, a protected area and UNESCO World Heritage Site, is 180 km northeast of Bir Hima.

== History ==
Ancient history of human occupation of this habitat is credited to its resources of wild life, water and the limestone terrain. Saudi Arabia's rock art, which has found appreciation in recent years, is considered among the richest in the world along with other examples found in Australia, India and South Africa. The area was explored by the Philby-Ryckmans-Lippen expedition of 1951 and published by E. Anati (1969–72). It was then noted that the images on the rocks were inscribed with inset into the sandstone formation, dated 300–200 BC. Its rich heritage of rock petroglyphs caught the attention of Saudi Arabia's Department of Antiquities only after 1976 when Jubba and other sites were investigated. One of the expedition members investigating this art form found a site west of the ancient wells of Bir Hima where he recorded 250 images.

== Findings ==
Bir Hima, which is an ancient Palaeolithic and Neolithic site, lies north of Najran, categorized as a Lower Palaeolithic or Oldowan site. Apart from petroglyphs, carving tools used for this art work (in the form of chopper or pebble tools) were also found here, made of such materials as quartzite, andesite and flint. The images appear to have been inscribed with Bronze. The petroglyphs noted, when initially found in the 1950s, consisted of daggers and swords, bows with arrows tipped with transverse arrowheads, sickle swords and throw-sticks. These depictions were interpreted as symbolic of spiritual animism.

Bir Hima, as part of Najran, is a treasure trove of petroglyphs, eclipsed only by those found in the Jubba region. Here, 100 sites have been identified. In the Najran area, as many as 6,400 human and animal illustrations, which include more than 1,800 camels and 1,300 human depictions, have been recorded. At this important rock art site, apart from depictions of humans, giraffes and other animals, the sixth century inscriptions of Dhu Nuwas, a Himyarite King who occupied Najran, are also recorded. A number of articulated camel fragments were excavated at site 217-44. While its engravings are probably much earlier than those of Hunters Palette, the Bir Hima warrior, armed with bow, is almost identical to the men on the Hunters Palette. Thousands of inscriptions have also been found, in various scripts including the al-musnad alphabet, Aramaic-Nabatean, Thamudic and other South Arabian, Greek, and Islamic. One of the most well-known inscriptions found from this site is Ja 1028, which informs the understanding of the massacre of the Christian community of Najran.

== Gallery ==
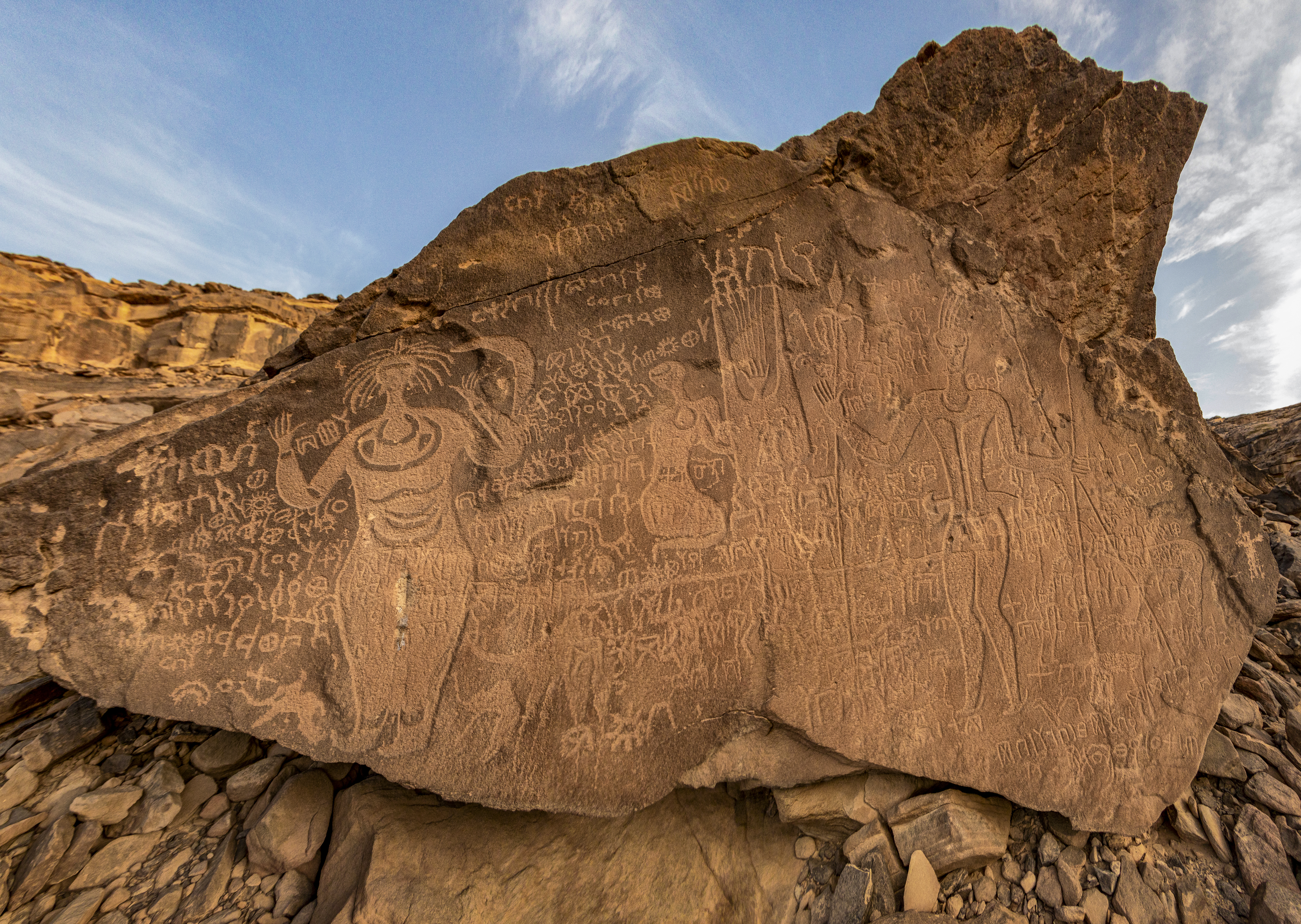
Inscription of The Dancers

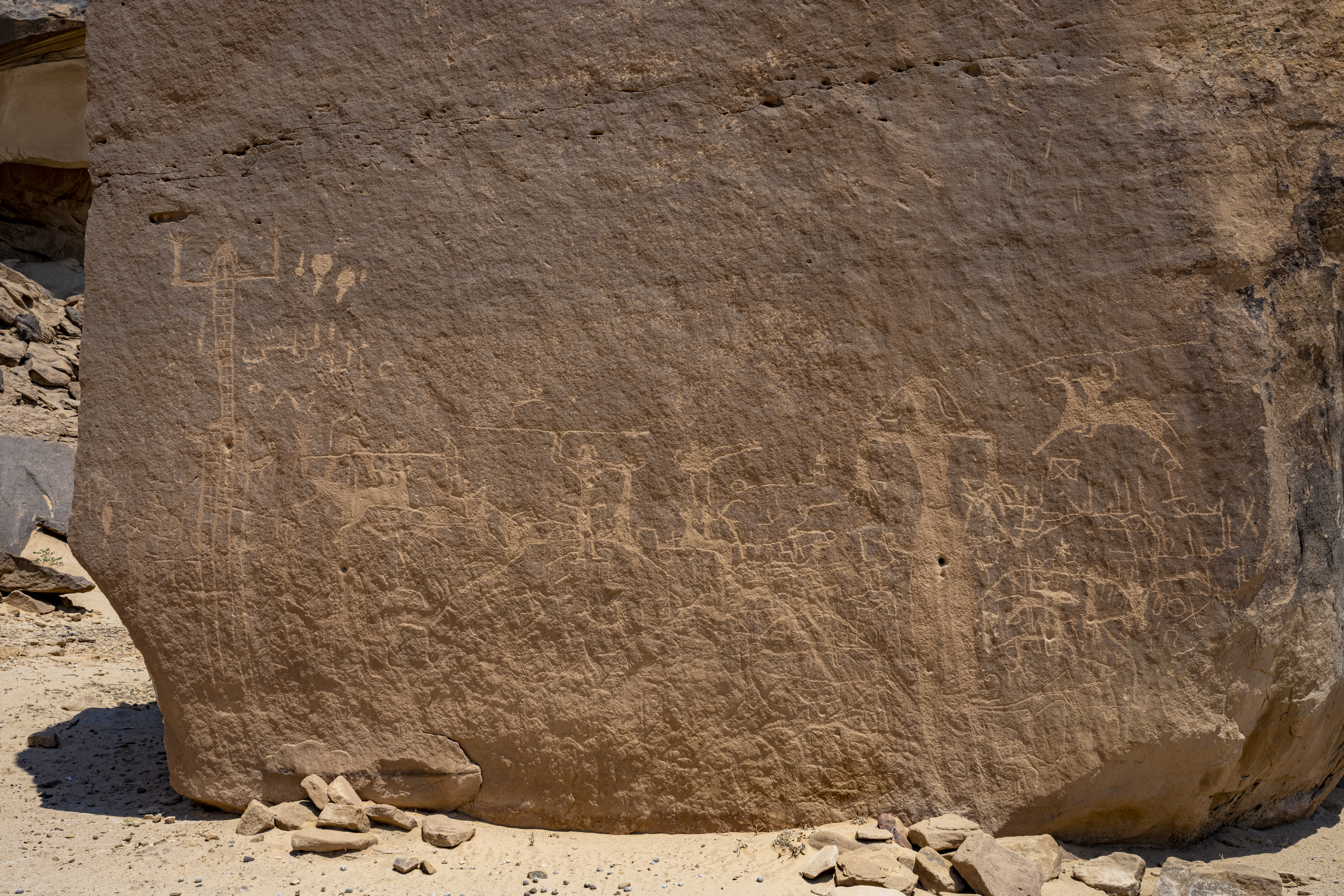
Hima Cultural Area Overview

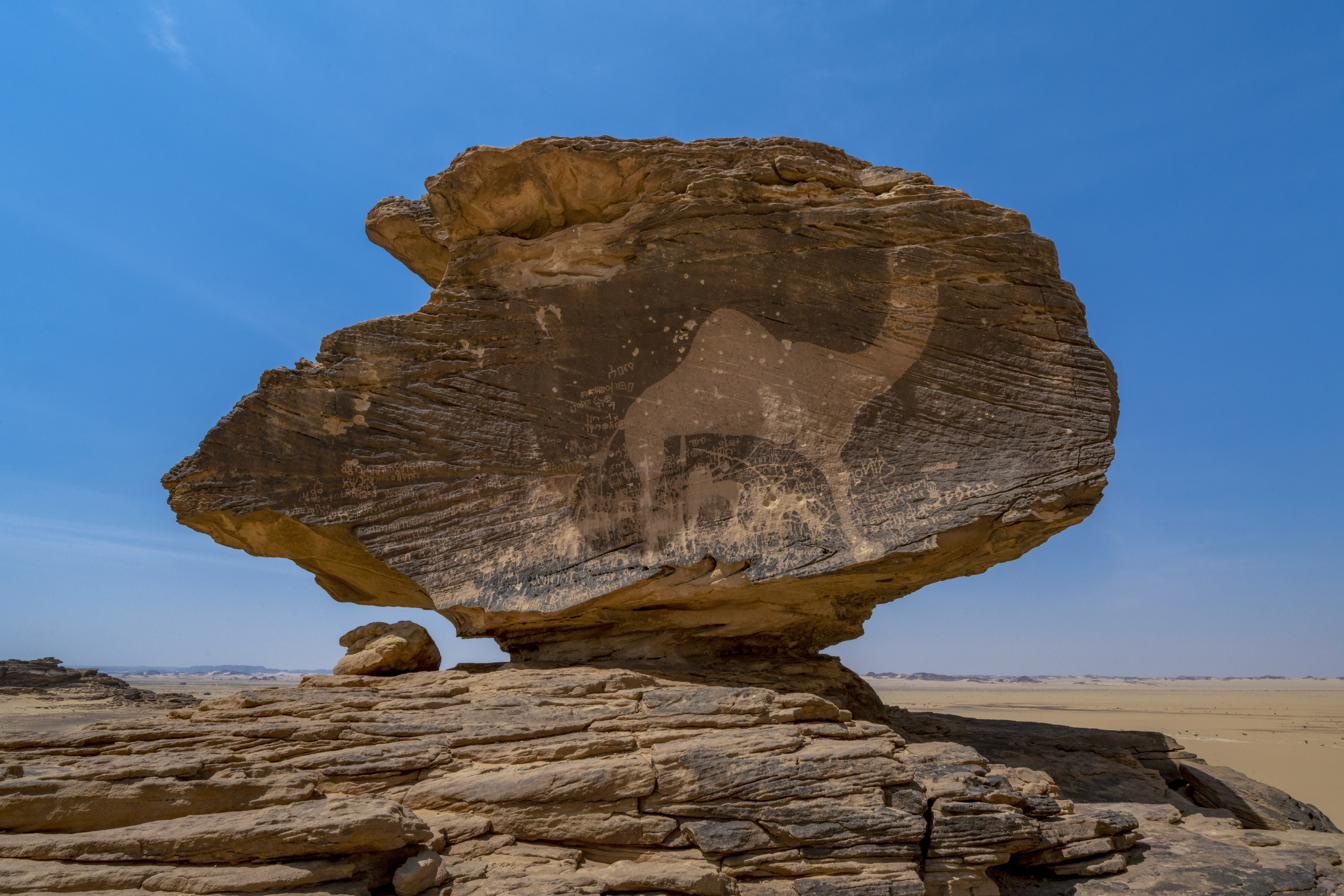
Inscriptions of Al-Mauaqea mountain

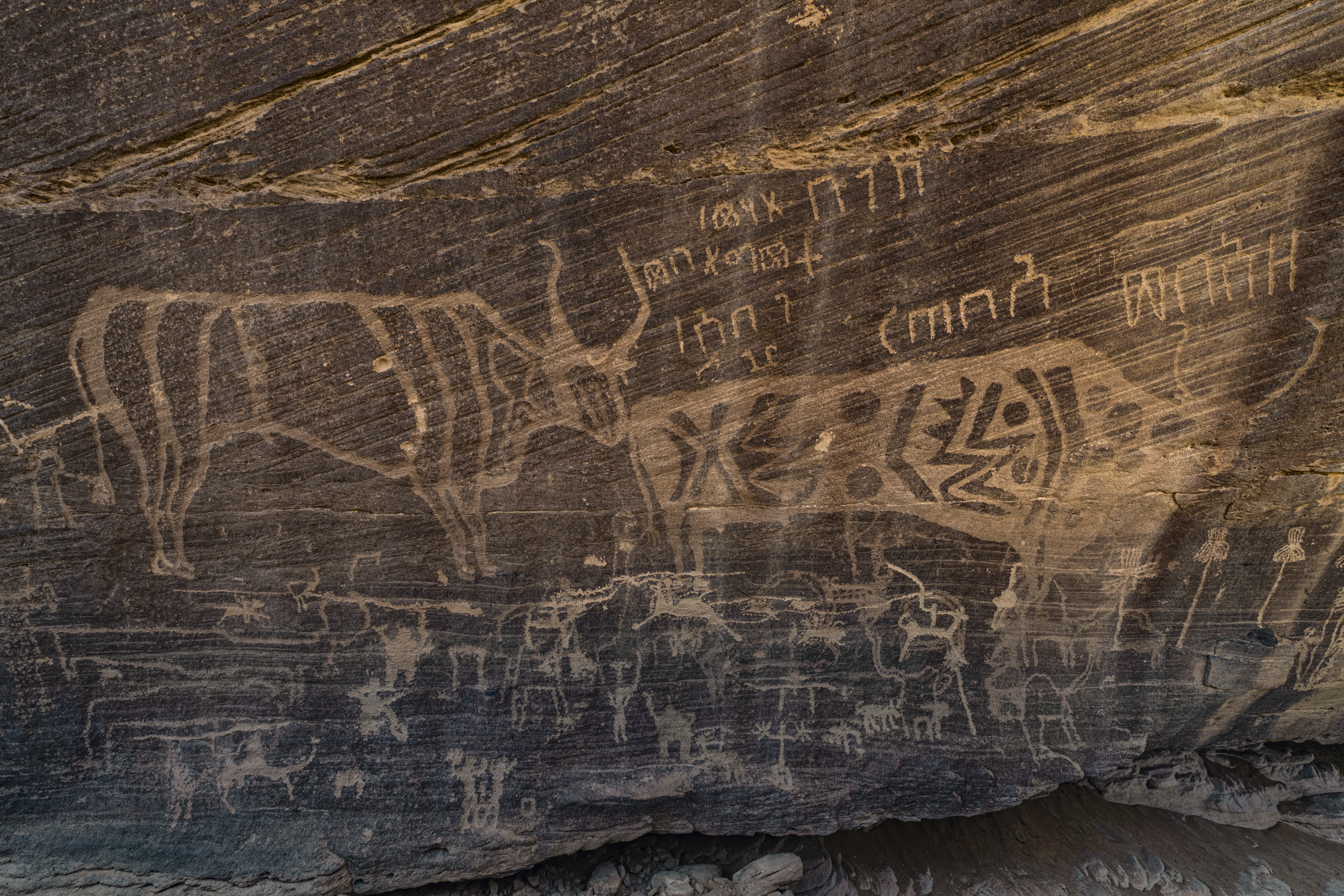
Inscriptions of Minshaf

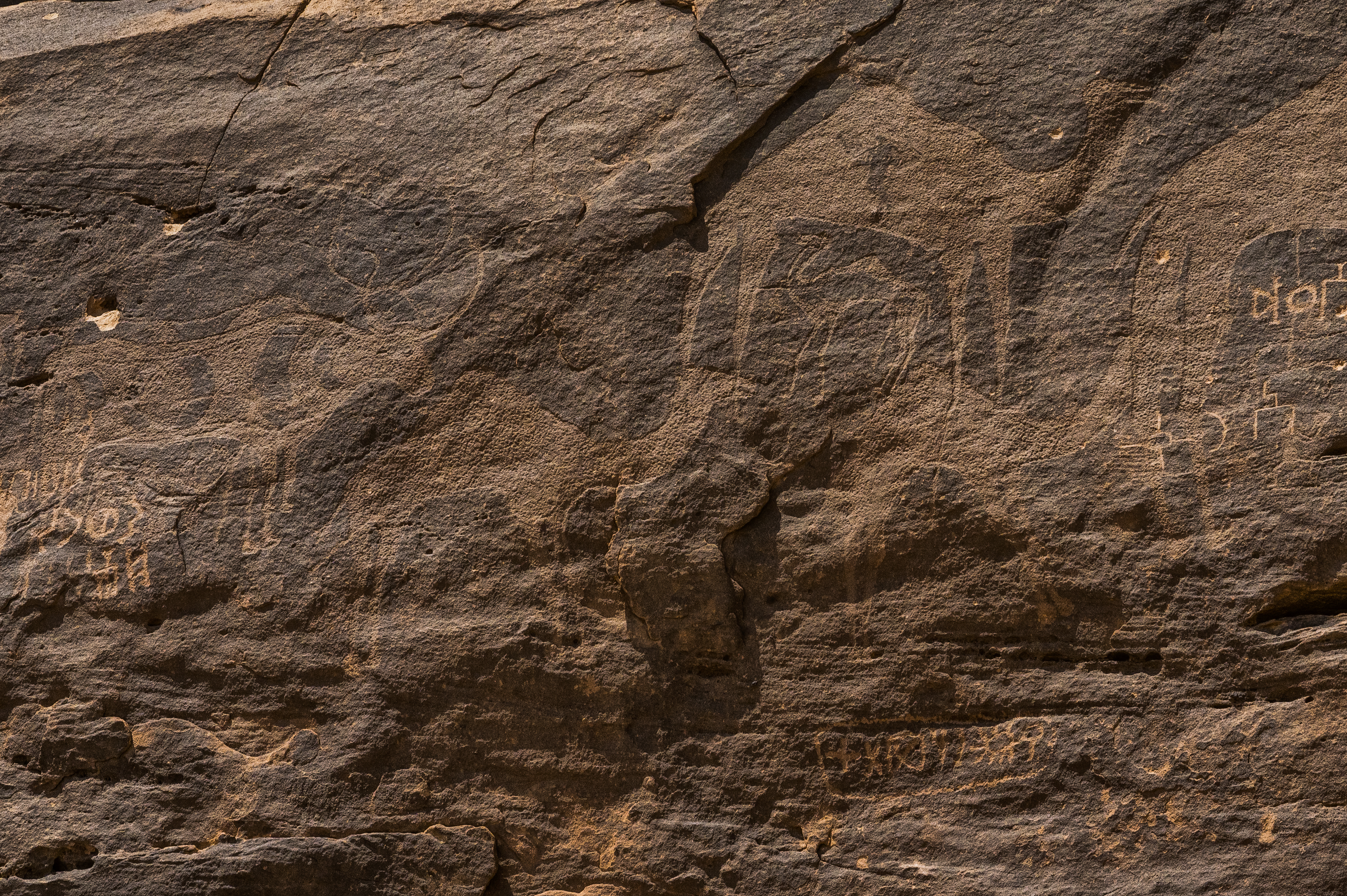
Inscription of Shasaa

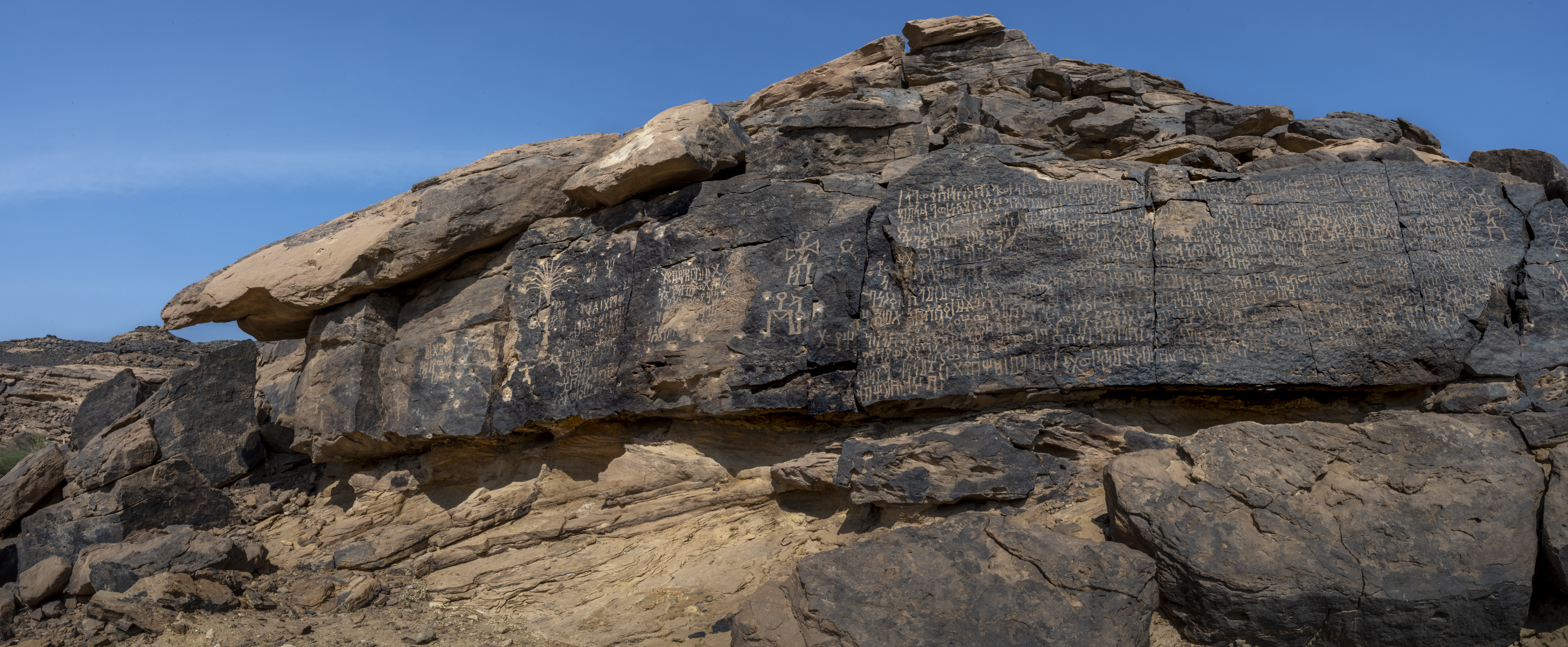
Inscriptions of Hima mountain
