= Abu Kharjah =

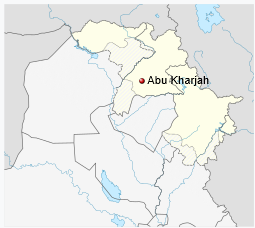
Map of Abu Kharjah in Northern Iraq (2016).

Abu Kharjah (أقاب خارجهائئ) is a place on the Tigris River east of Kirkuk and south of Erbil in northern Iraq, at latitude 35.5917 north and longitude 44.0439 east.

The etymology of the name means I stand outside.

The climate exhibits extremely hot summers and cool wet winters.
