= Al Kharjah, Iraq =

Al Kharjah is a town in Iraq, that is south of Samarra.

Al Kharjah is located at 33.9833°N 44.2167°E and is near Balad, Iraq.
