= Pre-Islamic Arabia =

Human history in the Arabian Peninsula before 610 CE

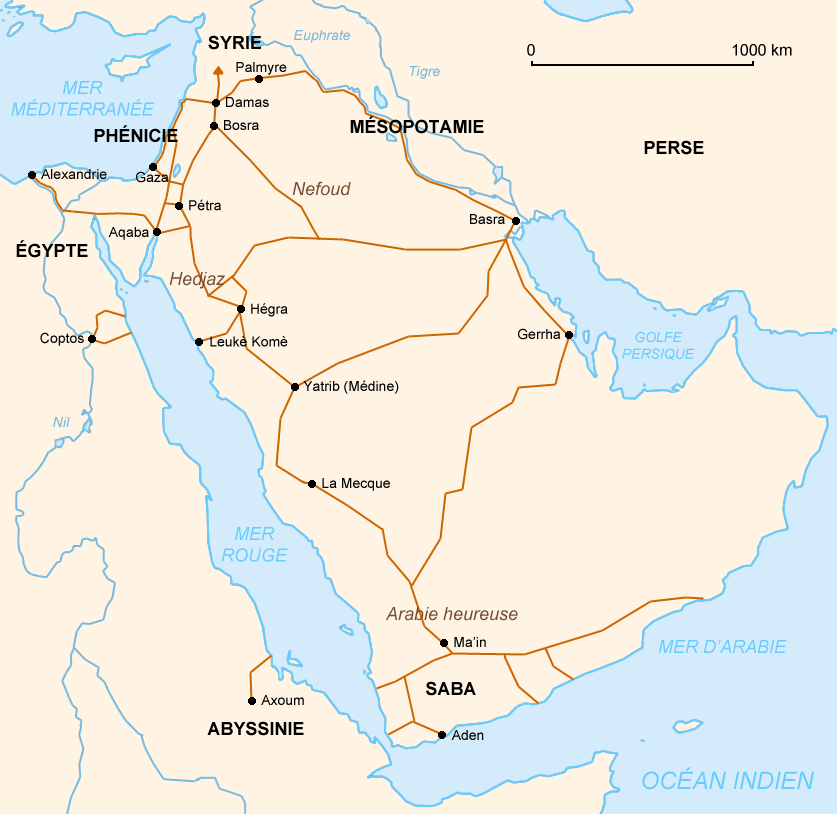
Trade routes of the Nabataeans throughout the Arabian Peninsula

Pre-Islamic Arabia is an era that encompasses human history in parts of the Arabian Peninsula and the Southern Levant before the spread of Islam beginning in 610 CE. During the prehistoric period, humans first migrated and settled into the peninsula. In the early first millennium BC, writing and recorded history are introduced into the Peninsula, along with the rise of the first kingdoms in the south. Arabia in late antiquity saw the growth of monotheistic religions, the rise and spread of the Arabic script, increased commercial integration into the wider Near Eastern and Mediterranean world, and the rise of imperial proxy warfare involving the Byzantine and Sasanian Empires.

In the early 7th century, the pre-Islamic period quickly came to a close, from the beginning of Muhammad's preachings of Islam, to his establishment of the first Islamic state in 622 in Medina, and the subsequent conquest and political unification of the peninsula shortly after Muhammad's death in 632. Some strands of Islamic tradition interpret the pre-Islamic period as a barbaric, morally unenlightened period known as the "Jahiliyyah" (Arabic: جَاهِلِيَّة), but historians have not adopted that convention.

Pre-Islamic Arabia's demographics included both nomadic and settled populations, the latter of which eventually developed into distinctive civilizations. Eastern Arabia was home to the region's earliest civilizations, such as Dilmun, which is attested as a prominent trade partner of Mesopotamia during the Bronze Age; and its later pre-Islamic history is marked by the reign of consecutive Iranian empires, including those of the Parthians and the Sasanians. From the early 1st millennium BCE onward, South Arabia became home to a number of kingdoms, such as Sheba and Ma'in; while part of North Arabia became home to the Nabataean Kingdom, which was conquered and annexed by the Roman Empire in 106 CE, which became the province of Roman Arabia and started a period of Roman influence.

Arabian tribes and the southern kingdoms structured much of pre-Islamic society, and memory of those societies is filtered today through Islamic literature and pre-Islamic poetry. Pre-Islamic tribes engaged in warfare and formed alliances, and for most of history, practiced Arabian religions. Religion in pre-Islamic Arabia was diverse. Polytheism was prevalent for most of the region's history, with beliefs and practices having a common origin in ancient Semitic religion. Christianity, Judaism and monotheism became common in the region in the 4th century, a trend driven by Christian proselytization from the Byzantine Empire and the Kingdom of Aksum, as well as the conversion to monotheism and Judaism by the elite of the Himyarite Kingdom.

== Territory ==
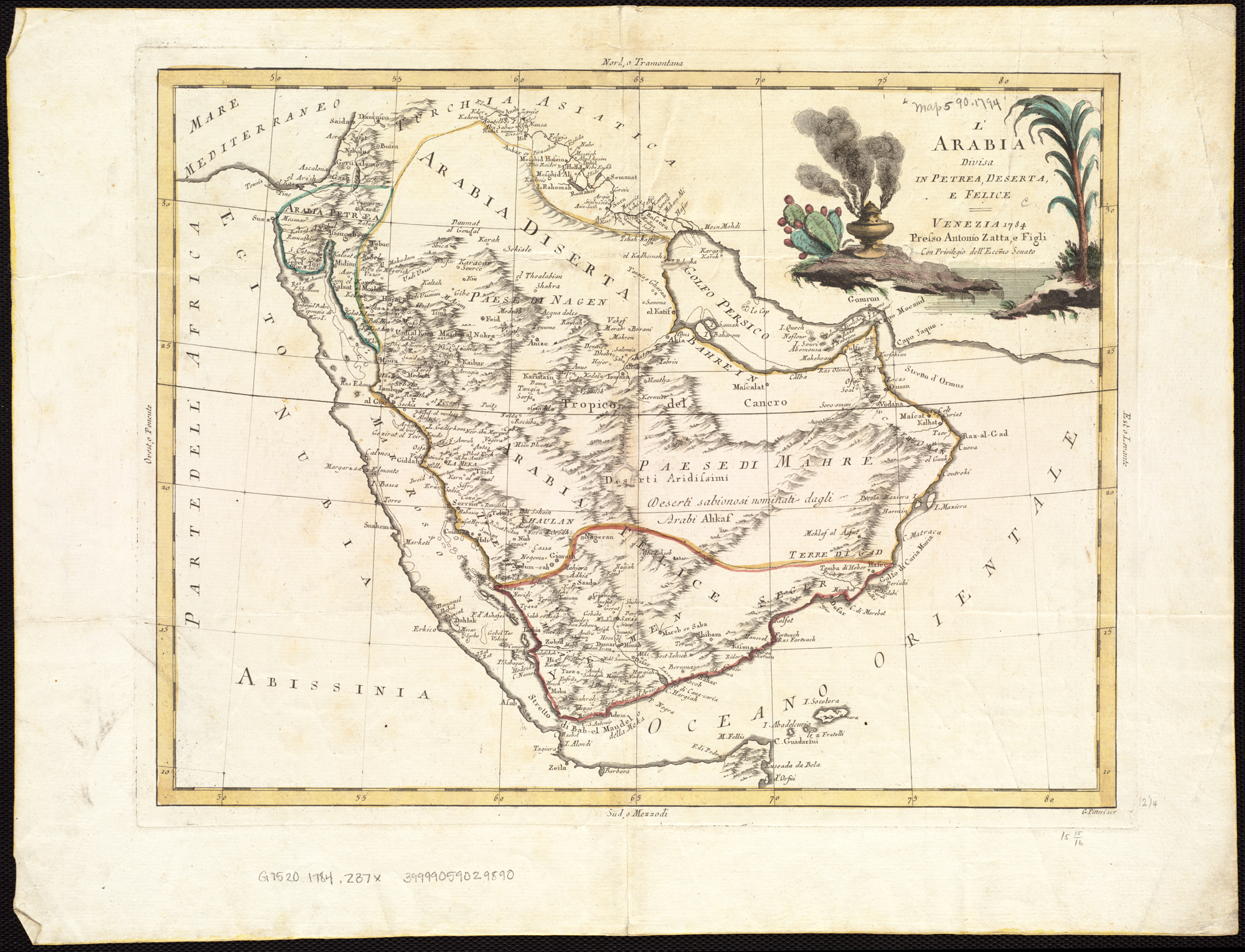
Territory of the three Roman provinces of Arabia, which were administered between the 2nd and 7th centuries CE: Arabia Petrea (in green), Arabia Deserta (in yellow), and Arabia Felix (in orange)

The Arabian Peninsula is a region of great ecological and environmental diversity and has given rise to distinct forms of human occupation throughout the region. It has an area of 2.5 million km^{2} and includes the modern-day regions of Saudi Arabia, Yemen, Oman, the United Arab Emirates, Qatar, Bahrain, Kuwait, and parts of Jordan. The Peninsula has 7,000 km of coastline, and most of the interior is covered by vast wastelands called dunes.

Before Islam, the territory implied by the word Arabia was different across many surviving sources, but it was not a synonym for the Arabian Peninsula. Instead, in the earliest sources, it encompassed both the peninsula, in addition to the steppe and desert wastes on the borders of Egypt and the Fertile Crescent. For Herodotus, an ancient Greek historian in the 5th century BC, "Arabia" refers to the areas as far out as eastern Egypt, the Sinai Peninsula, and the Negev. The Arabâya mentioned in Persian administrative sources includes the territory described by Herodotus, in addition to the areas of the Syrian desert. For Pliny the Elder, the Syrian desert (Arabia Deserta) itself was the territory of the "Arabia of the nomads".

== Prehistoric Arabia ==
Early human migration into Arabia took place during the Paleolithic period. Human occupation was not continuous, but punctuated, heavily influenced by changing patterns of rainfall and precipitation, resulting in expansions, contractions, and migrations of early Arabian populations of humans. Among the earliest human settlements that have been found date back to 240,000 to 190,000 years ago, and the oldest human fossils known from Arabia are over 80,000 years old. The earliest human populations likely migrated into Arabia from Africa, settling into the Eastern coastline. In the Neolithic period, Arabia witnessed a large demographic expansion, and humans began to widely settle the south and inland regions of Arabia. Eventually, by 6,000 years ago, the Arabian economy transitioned into one of nomadic pastoralism, but it continues to be debated whether the technology spread into Arabia through the migration of Levantine populations, where the practice was already established, or if it was an internal development that may have come about from trade with the Levant.

== Eastern Arabia ==
Eastern Arabia is a geographic region that generally refers to the territories covered by modern-day Kuwait, Bahrain, Qatar, the east coast of Saudi Arabia, the United Arab Emirates, and Oman. The main languages in the region among sedentary peoples wereAramaic, Arabic, and to some degree Persian. Syriac also came to be spoken as a liturgical language.

Many religions were practiced in the area. Practitioners included Arab Christians (including the tribe of Abd al-Qays), Aramean Christians, Persian-speaking Zoroastrians and Jewish agriculturalists. One hypothesis holds that the contemporary Baharna are descendants of Arameans, Jews, and Persians from the area. Zoroastrianism was also present in Eastern Arabia. The Zoroastrians of Eastern Arabia were known as "Majoos" in pre-Islamic times. The sedentary dialects of Eastern Arabia, including Bahrani Arabic, were influenced by Akkadian, Aramaic and other Syriac languages.

=== Bronze Age (3000 – 1300 BCE) ===
Dilmun and its neighbours in the second half of the third millennium BCE

During the Bronze Age, most of Eastern Arabia was part of the land of Dilmun, including modern-day Kuwait, Bahrain, Qatar and the adjacent coast of Saudi Arabia. Its capital was located in Bahrain. Dilmun, the earliest recorded civilization from Eastern Arabia, is mentioned in written records in the 3rd millennium BCE, with archaeological evidence indicating activity from the 4th to the 1st millennia BCE; its importance faltered after 1800. Dilmun is regarded as one of the oldest ancient civilizations in the Middle East in general.

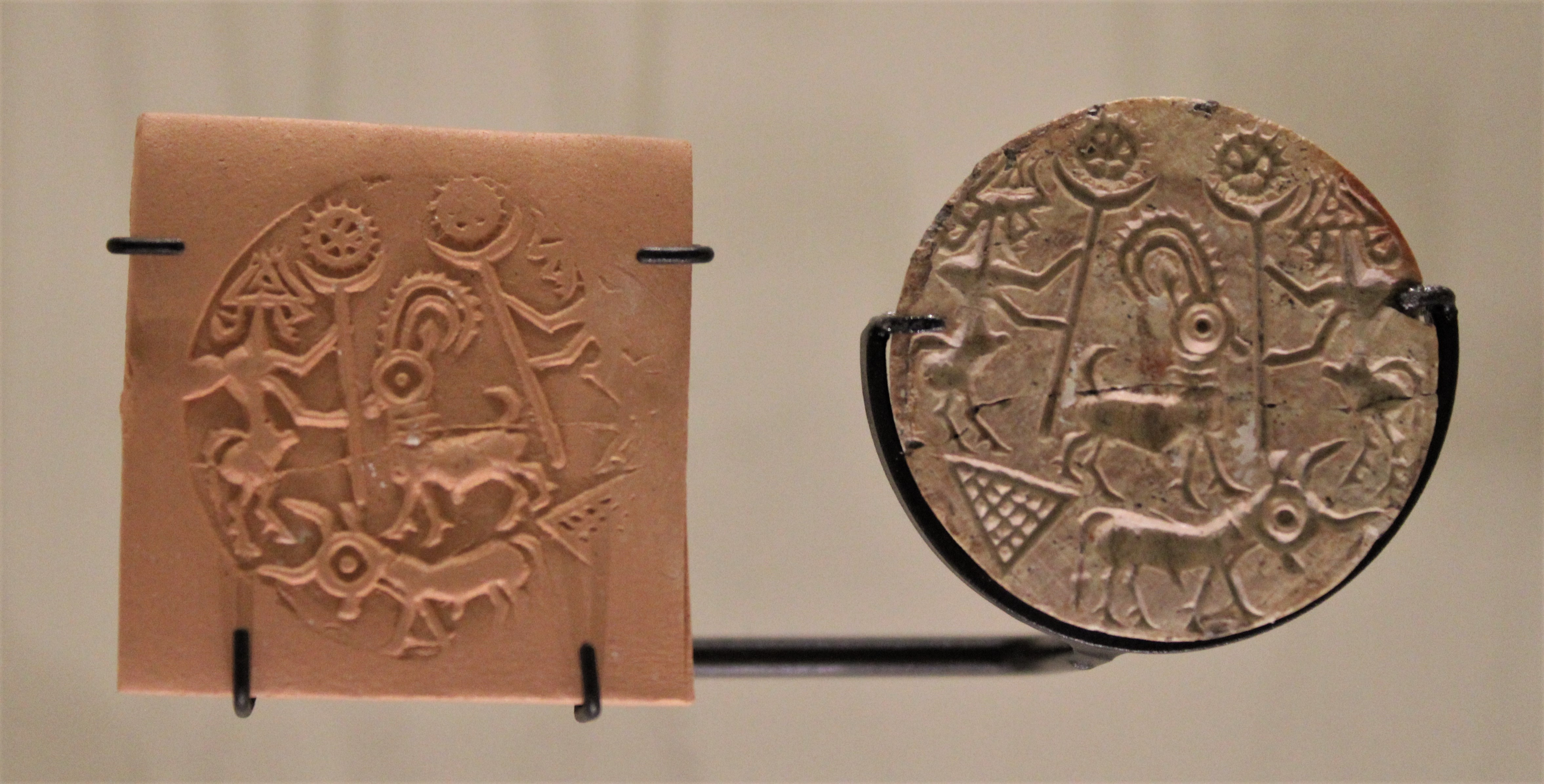
Chlorite seal found in Madinat Hamad belonging to the material culture of Dilmun dated between 2000 and 1800 BCE

The Dilmun civilization was an important trading center, which at the height of its power controlled the Persian Gulf trading routes. That was enabled by a number of natural advantages to the region, including its abundant underground water supplies and easy anchorages for ships. It became a center for long-distance trade and all types of commodities passed through it (trade extending to areas as far as the Indus Valley), including a variety of exotic goods. As a result, Dilmun became legendary in Mesopotamian literature. The Sumerians regarded Dilmun as a holy land. The Sumerians described Dilmun as a paradise garden in the Epic of Gilgamesh. The Sumerian tale of the garden paradise of Dilmun may have been an inspiration for the Garden of Eden story. Dilmun, sometimes described as "the place where the sun rises" and "the Land of the Living", is the scene of some versions of the Eridu Genesis, and the place where the deified Sumerian hero of the flood, Utnapishtim (Ziusudra), was taken by the gods to live forever. Thorkild Jacobsen's translation of the Eridu Genesis calls it "Mount Dilmun", which he locates as a "faraway, half-mythical place".

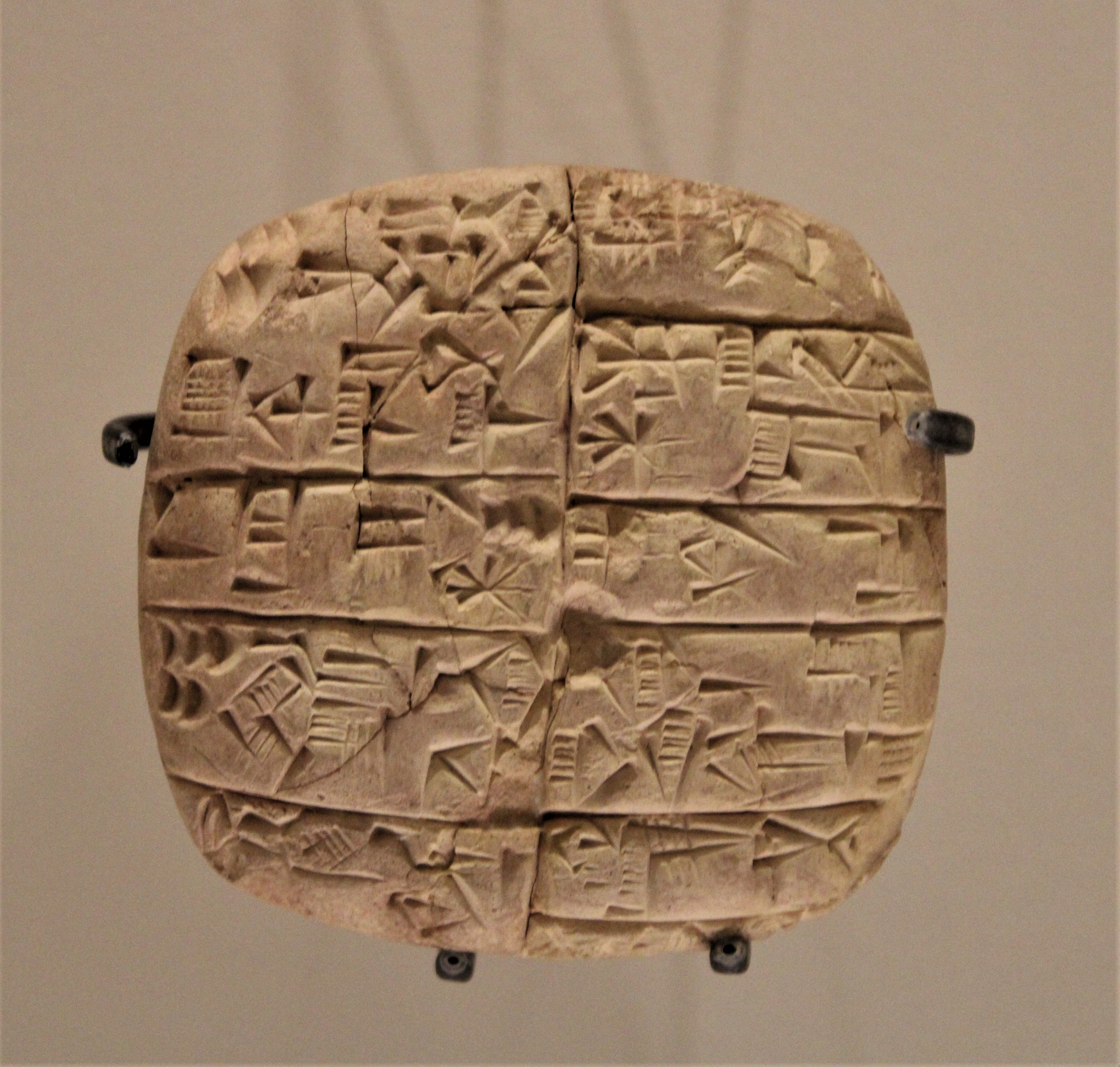
Sumerian cuneiform tablet recording shipments of wool and silver by Queen Lagash to Dilmun c. 2350 BCE found in a tel in Girsu

Dilmun was mentioned in two letters dated to the reign of Burna-Buriash II (c. 1370 BCE) recovered from Nippur, during the Kassite dynasty of Babylon. Those letters were from a provincial official, Ilī-ippašra, in Dilmun to his friend Enlil-kidinni in Mesopotamia. The names referred to are Akkadian. The letters and other documents hint at an administrative relationship between Dilmun and Babylon at that time. Following the collapse of the Kassite dynasty, Mesopotamian documents make no mention of Dilmun with the exception of Assyrian inscriptions dated to 1250 BCE, which proclaimed the Assyrian king to be king of Dilmun and Meluhha. Assyrian inscriptions recorded tribute from Dilmun. There are other Assyrian inscriptions during the first millennium BCE indicating Assyrian sovereignty over Dilmun. Dilmun was also later on controlled by the Kassite dynasty in Mesopotamia.

In the 19th and the early 20th centuries, some historians believed that the Phoenicians originated from Eastern Arabia, particularly Dilmun. However, that theory has since been abandoned.

=== Iron Age (1300 – 330 BCE) ===
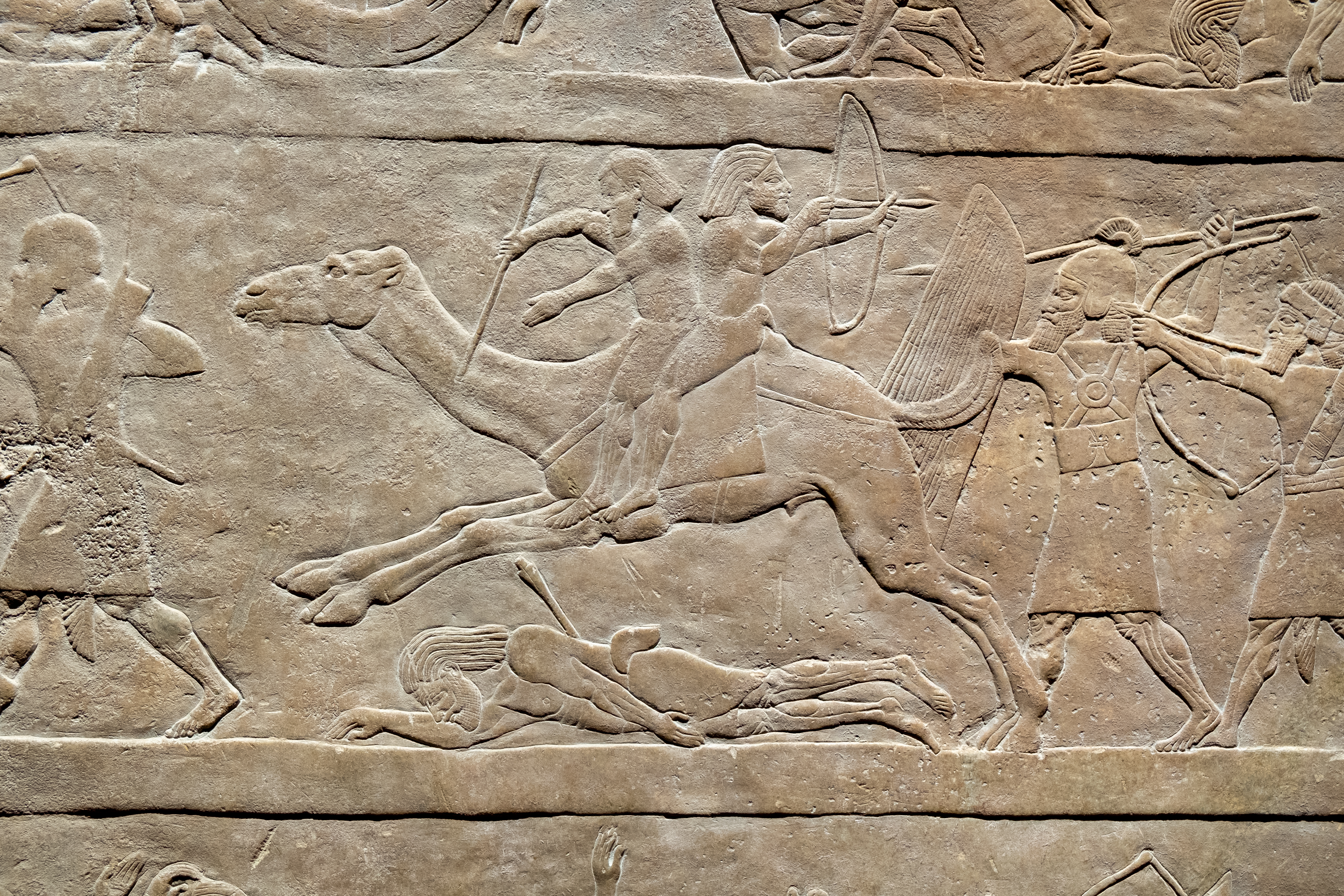
Relief from Ashurbanipal's palace showing Assyrians fighting and pursuing Arabs on camelback.

Upon the Late Bronze Age collapse, the major powers across the Near East lost much of their power, which allowed many smaller and far-flung states to become more independent and a number of minor states to emerge. In addition, new scripts and alphabets were developed, which were very useful to merchants to produce contracts and conduct other and related economic affairs. In turn, the Middle Assyrian Empire became much more prominent and undertook an aggressively expansionist policy. In the second half of the 13th century BCE, Tukulti-Ninurta I took on the title "king of Dilmun and Meluhha".

Dilmun disappeared from Assyrian sources until the reign of Sargon II, king of the Neo-Assyrian Empire. Then and across the next century, Dilmun appeared as a polity that was not directly ruled by Assyria although it sent tribute to the Assyrian rulers in exchange for peace and independence. When the Neo-Babylonian Empire overthrew the Assyrian Empire, its influence on Dilmun was also attested. Finally, Dilmun fell under the sway of the Persians after the rise of the Achaemenid Empire, which replaced the Babylonians.

=== Greco-Roman/Parthian period (330 BCE – 240 CE) ===
After Alexander the Great returned from his conquests that reached India, settling in Babylonia, it is said by the historian Arrian that he was turning his attention towards an invasion of the Arabian peninsula. Although he died too soon for the campaign to take place, Alexander dispatched three intelligence-gathering missions to gather knowledge about the peninsula. Those missions greatly enhanced information about the peninsula to the Hellenistic world. Alexander and his Seleucid successors, who controlled of the relevant region near Arabia after his death, took an interest in Arabia because trade happening there involved luxury products.

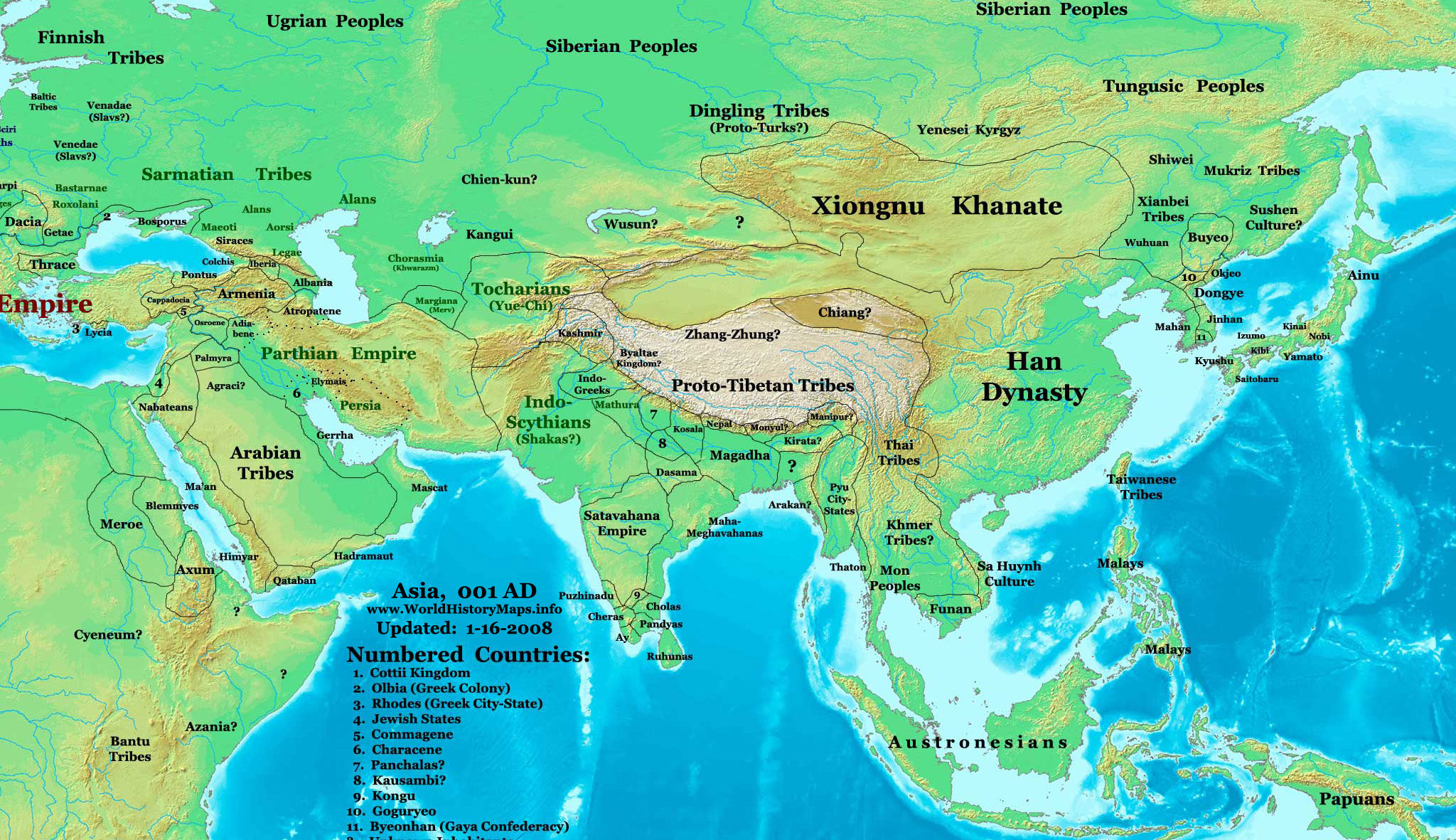
Gerrha and its neighbors in 1 CE.

In that context, Gerrha was an ancient city of great importance in Eastern Arabia. It was located on the west side of the Persian Gulf. Soon after the conquests of Alexander the Great, it became the most important center of trade for the Hellenistic world in the Gulf region, known for its transport of Arabian aromatics and goods from India further away. It retained its prominence until the first centuries of the common era. While there is no certainty as to which archaeological site the Gerrha of Greek sources can be identified with, the most prominent candidates have been Thaj and Hagar (modern-day Hofuf). The Greeks also described Bahrain in their writings, referring to it by their exonym, Tylos. Tylos was the center of pearl trading when Nearchus came to discover it serving under Alexander the Great.

From the 6th to the 3rd centuries BCE, Bahrain was part of the Achaemenid Empire, an Iranian dynasty. The Greek admiral Nearchus is believed to have been the first of Alexander's commanders to visit the islands, and he found a verdant land that was part of a wide trading network. he recorded, "That in the island of Tylos, situated in the Persian Gulf, are large plantations of cotton tree, from which are manufactured clothes called sindones, a very different degrees of value, some being costly, others less expensive. The use of them is not confined to India, but extends to Arabia". The Greek historian Theophrastus states that much of the islands were covered in those cotton trees and that Tylos was famous for exporting walking canes engraved with emblems that were customarily carried in Babylon.

It is not known whether Bahrain was part of the Seleucid Empire, although the archaeological site at Qalat Al Bahrain has been proposed as a Seleucid base in the Persian Gulf. Tylos was integrated well into the Hellenised world: the language of the upper classes was Greek (although Aramaic was in everyday use), while Zeus was worshipped in the form of the Arabian sun-god Shams. Tylos even became the site of Greek athletic contests.

Another important player during that time was the Parthian Empire, which emerged from northeastern Iran and relinquished a significant amount of territory from the eastern borders of the Seleucids. The Seleucids would be eventually vanquished by the Roman Empire over the course of the 1st century BCE, leading to the Romans and Parthians being the main power contenders in the region, separated by the Syrian desert. Parthian influence extended over the Persian Gulf and reached as far as Oman. Garrisons were established at the southern coast of the Gulf to help extend their power.

=== Byzantine/Sasanian period (240 CE – 630 CE) ===
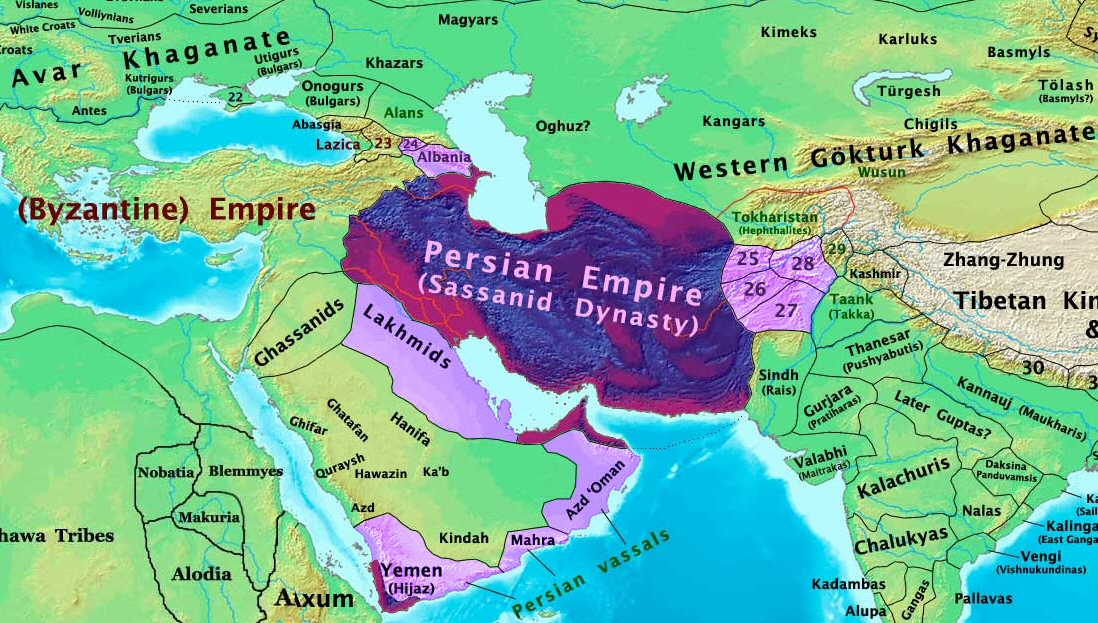
Asia in 600 CE, showing the Sasanian Empire before the Arab conquest.

A major shift in dynamics accompanied the replacement of the Parthian dynasty in Persian lands by the Sasanians, leading to the rise of the Sasanian Empire around 240 CE. Seizing the moment, Ardashir I, the first ruler of the dynasty marched down the Persian Gulf to Oman and Bahrain and defeated Sanatruq II (or Satiran), probably the Parthian governor of Eastern Arabia. He appointed his son Shapur I as governor of Eastern Arabia. Shapur constructed a new city there and named it Vahman Ardashir after his father. Eastern Arabia then incorporated the southern Sasanian province covering the Persian Gulf's southern shore plus the archipelago of Bahrain. The southern province of the Sasanians was subdivided into the three districts of Haggar (Hofuf, Saudi Arabia), Vahman Ardashir (al-Qatif province, Saudi Arabia), and Mishmahig (Muharraq, Bahrain; also referred to as Samahij), which included the Bahrain archipelago that was earlier called Aval.

Sasanian interests in the region largely lay in controlling traffic through the Persian Gulf, but land-incursions into the peninsula were occasionally undertaken, such as when the inhabitants of Eastern Arabia invaded southern Iran during the reign of Shapur II in the fourth century CE. During the political struggles of the sixth century, Khosrow I began to exert more direct rule over Eastern Arabia, including the direct appointment of regional governors. Another development of the Sasanian period is the rise of Christianity in Eastern Arabia.

==== Beth Qatraye ====
In antiquity, Syriac Christians referred to a region in northeast Arabia as "Beth Qatraye", or the "region of the Qataris". The vernacular language in the region was called Qatrayith. The region encompassed a territory that, today, includes Bahrain, Tarout Island, Al-Khatt, Al-Hasa, Qatar, and possibly the United Arab Emirates. The region was also sometimes called "the Isles".

By the 5th century, Beth Qatraye was a major center for Nestorian Christianity, which had come to dominate the southern shores of the Persian Gulf. As a sect, the Nestorians were often persecuted as heretics by the Byzantine Empire, but eastern Arabia was outside the empire's control and so offered some safety. Several notable Nestorian writers originated from Beth Qatraye, including Isaac of Nineveh, Dadisho Qatraya, Gabriel of Qatar and Ahob of Qatar. Christianity's significance was diminished by the arrival of Islam in Eastern Arabia by 628. In 676, the bishops of Beth Qatraye stopped attending synods; although the practice of Christianity persisted in the region until the late 9th century.

The dioceses of Beth Qatraye did not form an ecclesiastical province except for a short period during the mid-to-late 7th century. They were instead subject to the Metropolitan of Fars.

==== Beth Mazunaye ====
Oman and the United Arab Emirates comprised the ecclesiastical province known as Beth Mazunaye. The name was derived from 'Mazun', the Persian name for Oman and the United Arab Emirates. Compared to Beth Qatraye, Beth Mazunaye is much less well-known.

== South Arabia ==
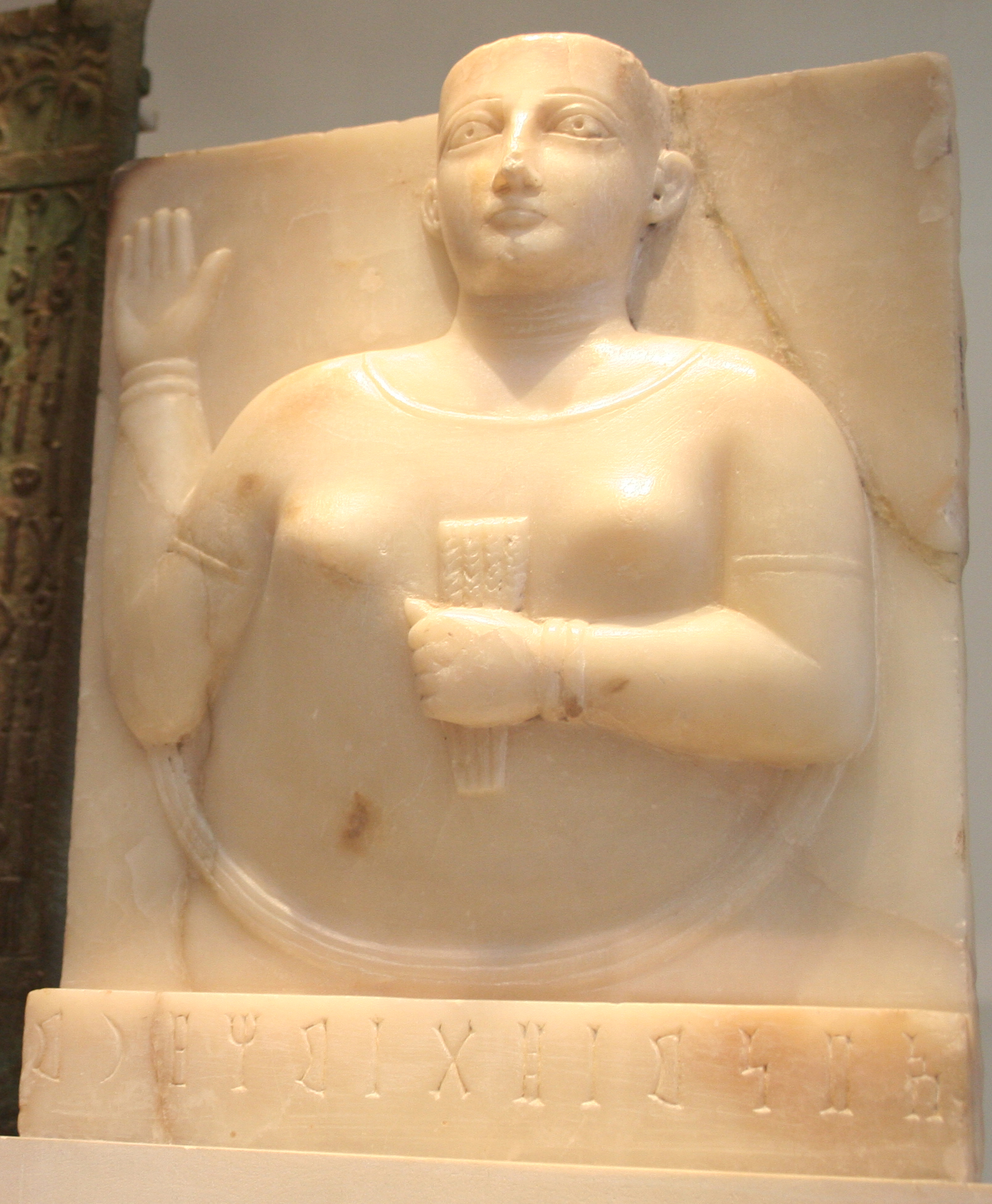
South Arabian gravestone of a young woman named Aban, portrayed frontally with a raised right hand and a sheaf of a wheat in her left hand, symbolizing fertility. British Museum, London

South Arabia roughly corresponds to modern-day Yemen, with Oman being designated as part of Eastern Arabia. In contrast to the rest of Arabia, South Arabia is a self-contained cultural area that retained the independence of its cultural, political, and linguistic dynamics from the rise of its first known kingdoms until the end of late antiquity. The rise of the South Arabian kingdoms owes itself to the construction of irrigation complexes that captured precipitation by the biannual monsoon rains, enabling agriculture, and the trade routes that carried incense and other spices, giving rise to tales of legendary wealth about the region among Greco-Roman observers.

The South Arabian kingdoms emerged in the early first millennium BCE, and they included the Kingdoms of Ma'in, Saba, Hadhramaut, Aswan, and Qataban. Until recently, very little was known about human activity in South Arabia prior to the first millennium BCE. However, recent decades of archaeological work have begun to rapidly change the situation. That has helped increase the prominence of the discipline though it has not yet became a mainstream topic in Near Eastern archaeology.

In the 3rd century CE, the Kingdom of Himyar emerged and conquered its neighbours to exert complete political domination over South Arabia. The situation persisted for several centuries, until the Himyarite polity unravelled over the course of the 6th century CE and experienced a societal collapse. The collapse had no single cause, instead, a number of coinciding events contributed to the situation. First, a rapid series of turbulent political events took place: the violent coup of Dhu Nuwas, the massacre of the Christian community of Najran, the Aksumite conquest of Himyar, and the rebellion of the Ethiopian soldiers in South Arabia against Aksum. Epidemic and climatological factors also contributed: one inscription (CIH 541) from the 550s indicates that the Plague of Justinian struck South Arabia. Severe droughts took place from 500 to 530 CE, and around the mid-6th century, there was the Late Antique Little Ice Age. Across the Arabian Peninsula, the effect of each of those factors was most severe in the South, especially in the Southwest.

By the 550s and 560s, the decline of Himyar was complete, as it faced military incursions from Central and Northwest Arabia and local insurrections. In 559 CE, the final Himyarite inscription was recorded. The collapse of the traditional order is indicated by the breakdown of the Marib Dam over the course of the 570s. A creeping in of influence from the Persian Sasanian Empire is evident towards the end of the 6th century.

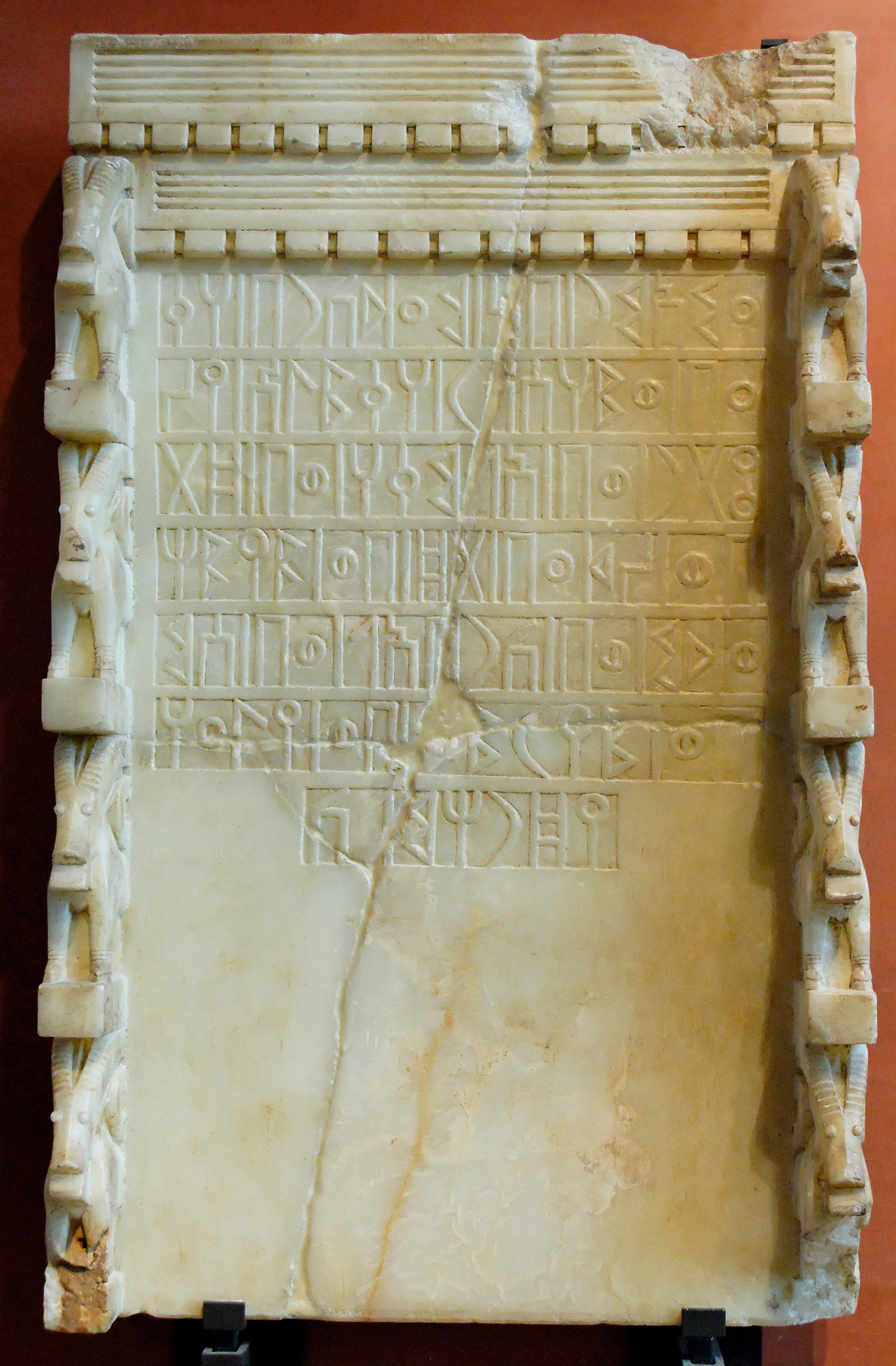
Sabaean inscription addressed to the moon-god Almaqah, mentioning five South Arabian gods, two reigning sovereigns and two governors, 7th century BCE

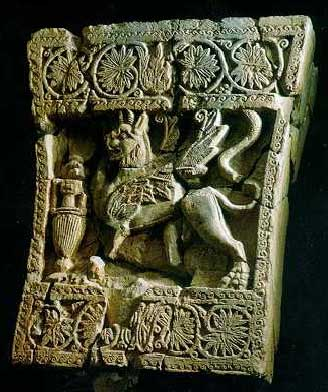
A Griffin from the royal palace at Shabwa, the capital city of the Kingdom of Hadhramaut

=== Kingdom of Saba (1000 BCE – 275 CE) ===
The Kingdom of Saba (or Sheba) was regarded by the South Arabian and earliest Ethiopian kingdoms as the locus for the birth of South Arabian civilization. The kingdom spoke Sabaic and constructed many impressive architectural complexes, such as the Marib Dam, which helped sequester the monsoon rains through an irrigation network that laid the foundation for the emergence of a civilization, and many temples, including the Temple of Awwam for their national god Almaqah where hundreds of inscriptions have been discovered. The Sabaeans had close contact with the cultures of the Horn of Africa. They went on to conquer both Eritrea and northern Ethiopia to establish the Kingdom of Dʿmt, where a hybrid Ethiosemitic script emerged. Under the leadership of Karib'il Watar, Saba dominated most of modern-day Yemen, a feat that would not be accomplished again in the region until the Himyarite Kingdom a thousand years later. Their legacy was remembered in both biblical and Islamic tradition, especially in the legendary story of the Queen of Sheba.

The Sabaean kingdom emerged some time around the turn of the 1st millennium BCE. By the time that the formative period of Sabaean history was complex, a fully developed alphabetic script was available, as well as the technological prowess to construct cities and other architectural complexes. There is some debate as to the degree to which the movement out of the formative phase was channeled by endogenous processes, or the transfer or technologies from other centers, perhaps via trade and immigration.

The first major phase of Sabaean civilization lasted from the 8th to the 1st centuries BCE. Rulers referred to themselves by the title Mukarrib ("federator") as a testimony to the hegemony they exerted over neighbouring polities. The period was dominated by a caravan economy that had market ties with the rest of the Near East. Its first major trading partners were at Khindanu and the Middle Euphrates. Later, it moved to Gaza during the Persian period, and finally, to Petra in Hellenistic times. The South Arabian deserts gave rise to important aromatics, which were exported in trade, especially frankincense and myrrh. It also acted as an intermediary for overland trade with neighbours in Africa and further off from India. Saba was a theocratic monarchy with a common cult surrounding their national god, Almaqah. Four other deities were also worshipped: Athtar, Haubas, Dhat-Himyam, and Dhat-Badan.

The first Sabaean period came to a close as the Roman Republic expanded to conquer Syria and Egypt in 63 and 30 BCE, respectively. They diverted the overland trade route through the Sabaean kingdom into a maritime trade route that went through the Hadhramaut port city of Qani. They even attempted to siege Marib, the Sabaean capital, but were unsuccessful. Greatly weakened, they were annexed by the neighbouring Himyarite Kingdom. Saba was able to regain their independence around 100 CE to onset a second period of their civilization. Notably, power dynamics had shifted from oasis cities like Marib and Sirwah to groups occupying the highlands. Ultimately, Himyar permanently re-annexed them, around 275 CE.

=== Kingdom of Awsan (8th century BCE – 7th century BCE) ===
Awsan was a South Arabian kingdom that lasted from the 8th to 7th centuries BCE, with a brief resurgence in the 2nd or 1st century BCE. Awsan is centered around a wadi called the Wadi Markha. The name of the capital of Awsan is unknown, but it is assumed to be the tell that is today known as Hagar Yahirr, the largest settlement in the wadi. The territory under its control was sizable enough that it was a powerful contender in local power politics. In the late 7th century BCE, under the reign of its ruler Murattaʿ, Awsan entered a military conflict with the Kingdom of Saba that brought about its demise. The Sabaean king, Karib'il Watar, defeated Awsan and proceeded to obliterate it. An inscription left behind claims that Karib'il killed over 16,000 people and took 40,000 more as prisoners. After that event, the wadi was left abandoned, and Awsan disappeared from the historical record for the time being. Saba had divided its territory between its then-allies, Qataban and Hadhramaut. Half a millennium later, when Qataban's control over the Wadi Markha was declining, Awsan was able to briefly re-emerge, in the 2nd or 1st centuries BCE. The final phase of the Awsanite kingdom is the only period in South Arabian history during which kings were deified.

=== Kingdom of Ma'in (8th century BCE – 1st century CE) ===
The Minaeans, or the inhabitants of the Kingdom of Ma'in, had their capital at Qarna (modern-day Sa'dah). Another important city was Yathill (now known as Baraqish). The Minaean Kingdom was centered in northwestern Yemen, with most of its cities lying along Wādī Madhab. Ma'in was responsible for managing an international frankincense trade and it set up a number of colonies across Arabia and the Mediterranean to manage it. For that reason, Minaic inscriptions have been found far afield of the Kingdom of Maīin, as far away as al-'Ula in northwestern Saudi Arabia and even on the island of Delos and Egypt.

=== Kingdom of Qataban (8th century BCE – 2nd century CE) ===
Qataban was one of the ancient Yemeni kingdoms that thrived in the Beihan valley. Like the other Southern Arabian kingdoms, it gained great wealth from the trade of frankincense and myrrh incense, which were burned at altars. The capital of Qataban was named Timna and was located on the trade route that passed through the other kingdoms of Hadramaut, Saba and Ma'in. The chief deity of the Qatabanians was Amm, or "Uncle" and the people called themselves the "children of Amm".

=== Kingdom of Hadhramaut (8th century BCE – 3rd century CE) ===
Hadhramaut is first mentioned in a 7th-century BCE inscription from the king of the Sabaean kingdom, Karib'il Watar, mentioned as an ally. For commercial reasons, Hadhramaut became one of the confederates of Ma'in when they took control of the caravan routes. After the fall of Ma'in, it experienced a period of independence. Hadhramaut had to repel attacks by Himyar in the 1st century BCE, and managed to annex Qataban in the 2nd century CE, when it reached its greatest size. Ultimately, the kingdom did fall to an invasion by the Himyarite king Shammar Yahri'sh in the 3rd century CE, making it the final one of the South Arabian kingdoms to fall to Himyar.

=== Kingdom of Himyar (110 BCE – 530 CE) ===
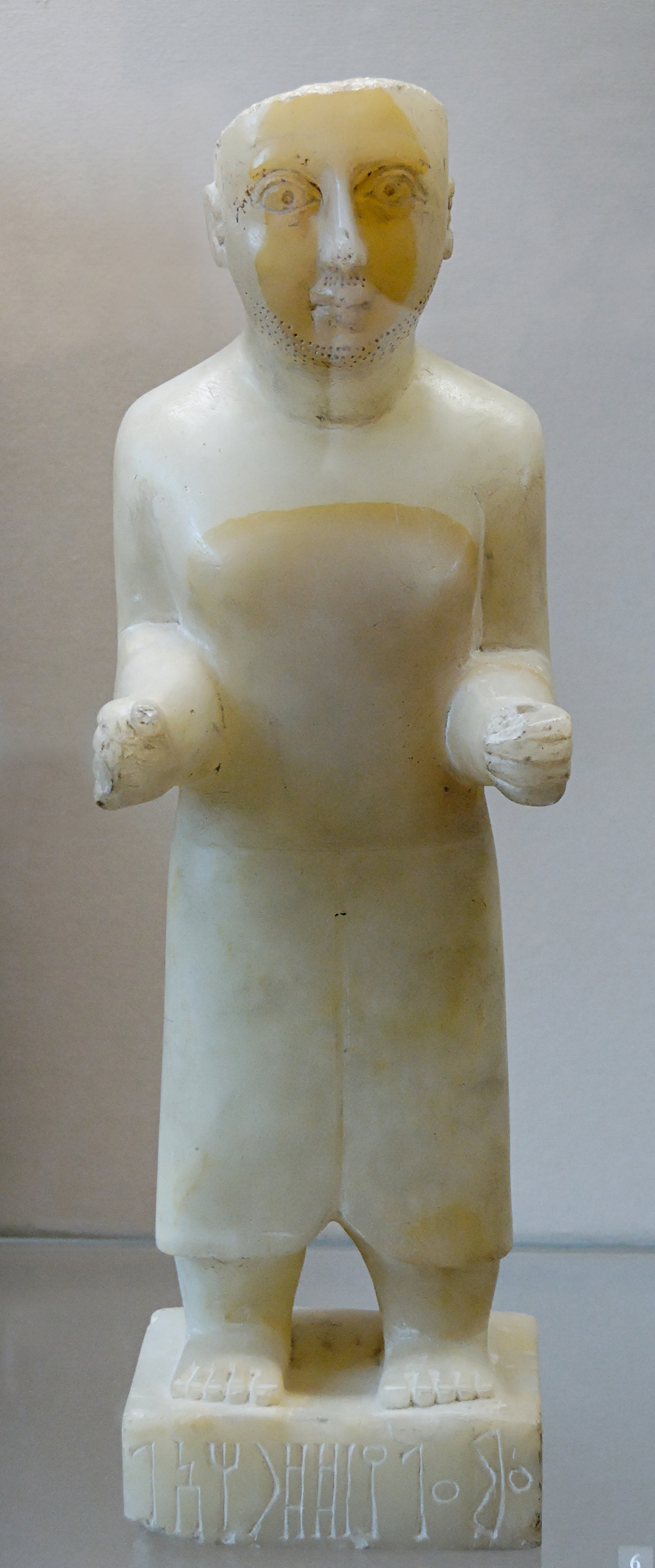
Statue of Ammaalay, 1st century BCE, Yemen

Himyar was a polity in the southern highlands of Yemen, as well as the name of the region that it claimed. Until 110 BCE, it was integrated into the Qatabanian kingdom, afterwards being recognized as an independent kingdom. According to classical sources, their capital was the ancient city of Zafar, relatively near the modern-day city of Sana'a. Himyarite power eventually shifted to Sana'a as the population increased in the fifth century. After the establishment of their kingdom, it was ruled by kings from dhū-Raydān tribe. The kingdom was named Raydān.

The kingdom conquered neighbouring Saba' in c. 25 BCE (for the first time), Qataban in c. 200 CE, and Haḍramaut c. 300 CE. Its political fortunes relative to Saba' changed frequently until it finally conquered the Sabaean Kingdom around 280. With successive invasion and Arabization, the kingdom collapsed in the early sixth century, as the Kingdom of Aksum conquered it in 530 CE.

The Himyarites originally worshiped most of the South-Arabian pantheon, including Wadd, ʿAthtar, 'Amm and Almaqah. Since at least the reign of Malkikarib Yuhamin (c. 375–400 CE), Judaism was adopted as the de facto state religion. The religion may have been adopted to some extent as much as two centuries earlier, but inscriptions to polytheistic deities ceased after that date. It was embraced initially by the upper classes and possibly a large proportion of the general population over time. Native Christian kings ruled Himyar in 500 CE until 521–522 CE as well, Christianity itself became the main religion after the Aksumite conquest in 530 CE.

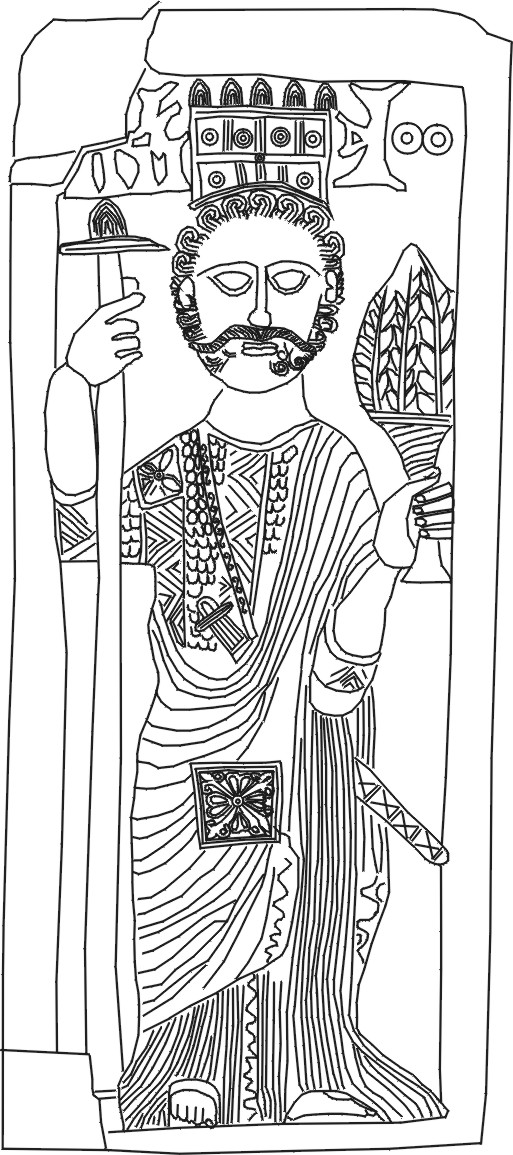
The 'Crowned Man' excavated from the Stone Building in Zafar.

=== Aksumite occupation of Yemen (525 – 570 CE) ===
In response to the massacre of the Christian community of Najran under the reign of the Jewish king Dhu Nuwas, the Christian king of the Kingdom of Aksum, Kaleb, responded by invading and annexing Himyar.

=== Sasanian period (570 – 630 CE) ===
In the second half of the sixth century, the Sasanian Empire conquered the Himyarite Kingdom and ended Aksumite occupation of South Arabia. The event is not mentioned in Sasanian sources and is noted only in passing in Byzantine sources.

The bulk of what has been written about the period comes from Arabic sources, most famously that of Al-Tabari in his History of the Prophets and Kings, relying on an earlier account by Ibn Ishaq. However, there are six major Arabic accounts describing the Sasanian conquest of South Arabia and they differ over a range of major and minor details, including who the key actors were and their relative roles, the religious identities of some of the authors, the sizes of the armies, and so forth. In Al-Tabari's reporting, the Persian king Khosrau I sent troops under the command of Vahriz (Persian: اسپهبد وهرز), who helped the semi-legendary Sayf ibn Dhi Yazan to drive the Aksumites out of Yemen. Southern Arabia became a Persian dominion under a Yemenite vassal and thus came within the sphere of influence of the Sasanian Empire.

After the demise of the Lakhmids, another army was sent to Yemen and made it a province of the Sasanian Empire under a Persian satrap. Following the death of Khosrau II in 628, the Persian governor in Southern Arabia, Badhan, converted to Islam, and Yemen followed the new religion.

== Western Arabia (Hejaz) ==
=== The rise of the oasis cities ===
The history of the Hejaz has often centred around its major oasis cities, especially Yathrib (Medina), Fadak, Khaybar, Taymah, and Al-Ula. Those cities benefited from regular access to water, and became major trading cities as early as the Bronze Age, especially with the domestication of the dromedary camel that allowed for long-distance trade, and the rise of the incense trade that demanded the movement of incense, spices and other luxury goods into the Eastern Mediterranean from South Arabia, passing through the Hejaz along the way.

Location of Dedan

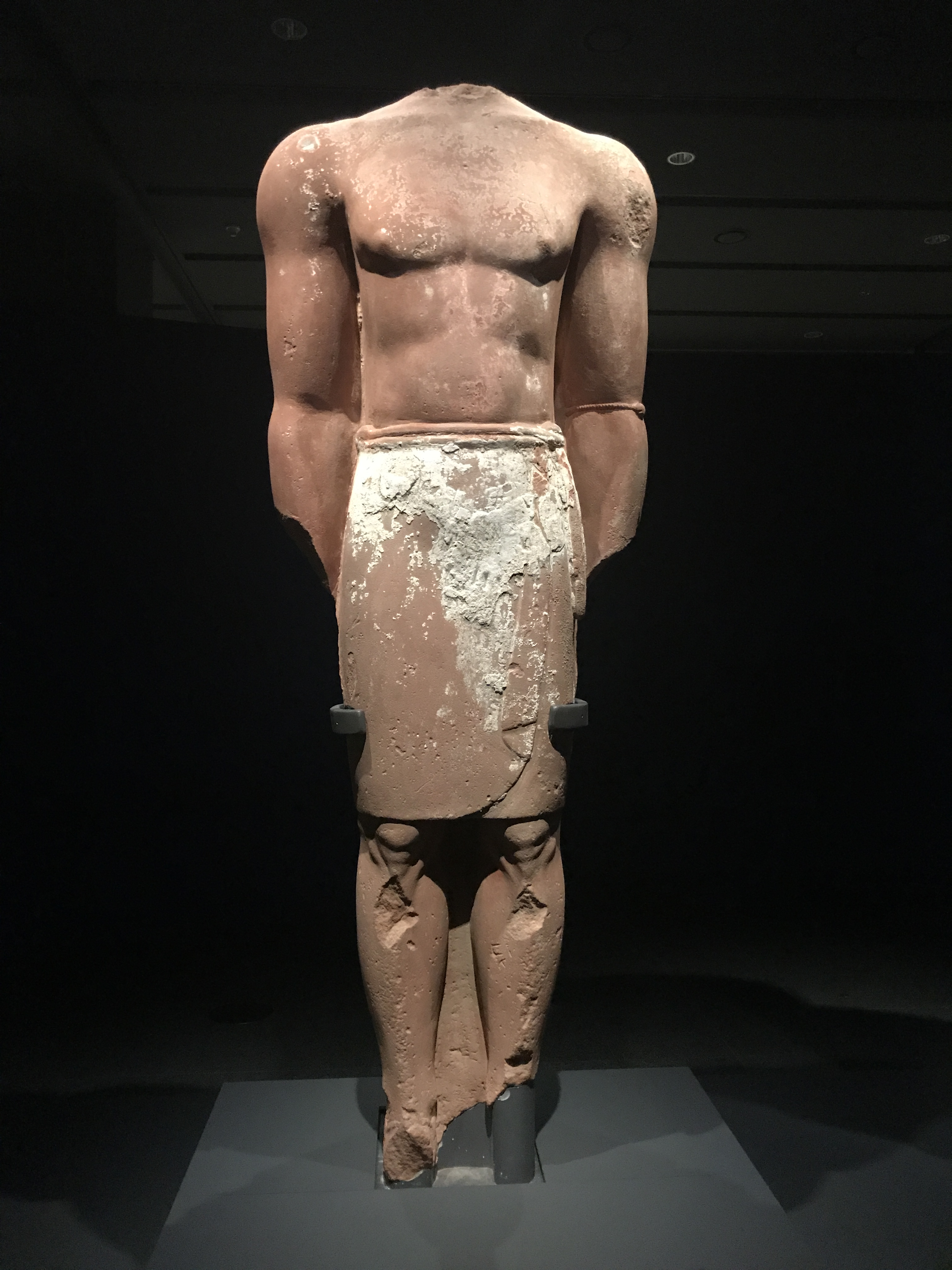
Colossal statue from al-Ula, it followed the standardized artistic sculpting of the Lihyanite kingdom, the original statue was painted with white

=== Lihyan/Dedan (5th century BCE — 1st century BCE) ===
The Kingdom of Lihyan ruled from the northwestern Hejaz, including its oasis cities like Tayma, down the western coast, up until a place somewhere in the region between Mecca and Medina. Their capital was at the city of Dedan, located in the Al-Ula oasis after which the Dadanitic script is named.

Lihyan ultimately fell, but it is not known whether that was because of direct conquest by the Nabataean Kingdom. Either way, the Nabataeans went on to occupy the northwestern Hejazi territory from the 1st century BCE until their own annexation by the Roman Empire underTrajan in 106 CE.

=== Thamud confederation (8th century BC — 5th century CE) ===
The Thamud are among the most notable of the Hejazi tribal confederations. They were based in the northwestern Hejaz with their center at Hegra. They are attested in texts from the eighth century BCE until the fifth century CE, in Mesopotamian, Classical, and Arabian sources. They are famously remembered in pre-Islamic poetry and the Quran. The Quran mentions them 26 times, as a polytheistic people destroyed by God for their rejection of the prophet Salih.

=== Ghassanid confederation (3rd century CE — 4th century CE) ===
Christian J. Robin's study of pre-Islamic epigraphy has suggested that between the third and fourth centuries CE, the Ghassanids were the main tribal confederation acting in the Hejaz, with a base that may have been stationed at Medina. The period of Ghassanid domination of the region ended when the Banu Ghassan migrated northwards, into the territory of Syria, which would remain their main base of operations until Islamic times.

=== Mudar confederation and the Jewish tribes of Arabia (5th century CE — 7th century CE) ===
After the Ghassanids migrated out of the Hejaz, the Mudar confederation became the main power actors in Western Arabia. They may have been subservient to the confederation of Ma'add (based in Central Arabia) and the Kingdom of Himyar (based in South Arabia). Their territory fell on the western coast of Arabia, from Himyar to the south, to the territory of the Ghassanids to the north who, on account of the Byzantines, had projected their power into the northwestern Hejaz in the sixth century, up to the territory of Palaestina Salutaris (formerly Arabia Petraea).

The most well-known tribe of Mudar, today, is the Quraysh, rulers of Mecca (after the Jurhum) and the care-takers of the Kaaba and its pilgrimage rites. Over the course of the sixth century, tradition describes Quraysh's aspirations for expanding their hegemony in Arabia, forming trade agreements with nearby superpowers while exerting their growing influence on nearby regions.

The 5th to the 7th centuries also saw the rise of the Jewish tribes of Arabia, whose locus of power was also positioned along the western coast. The tribes occupied a similar geographic space to Mudar, while remaining distinct ethno-religious entities. In Al-Ula, the transition to a Jewish settlement appears to have taken please in the 5th century, which remained until the rise of Islamic Arabia. Early in the time of the career of Muhammad in Medina, in 622 CE, Muhammad brokered a treaty between the local Arab and Jewish tribes, which is today called the Constitution of Medina.

== North Arabia ==
Territorial expanse of the Qedarite federation in the 5th BCE

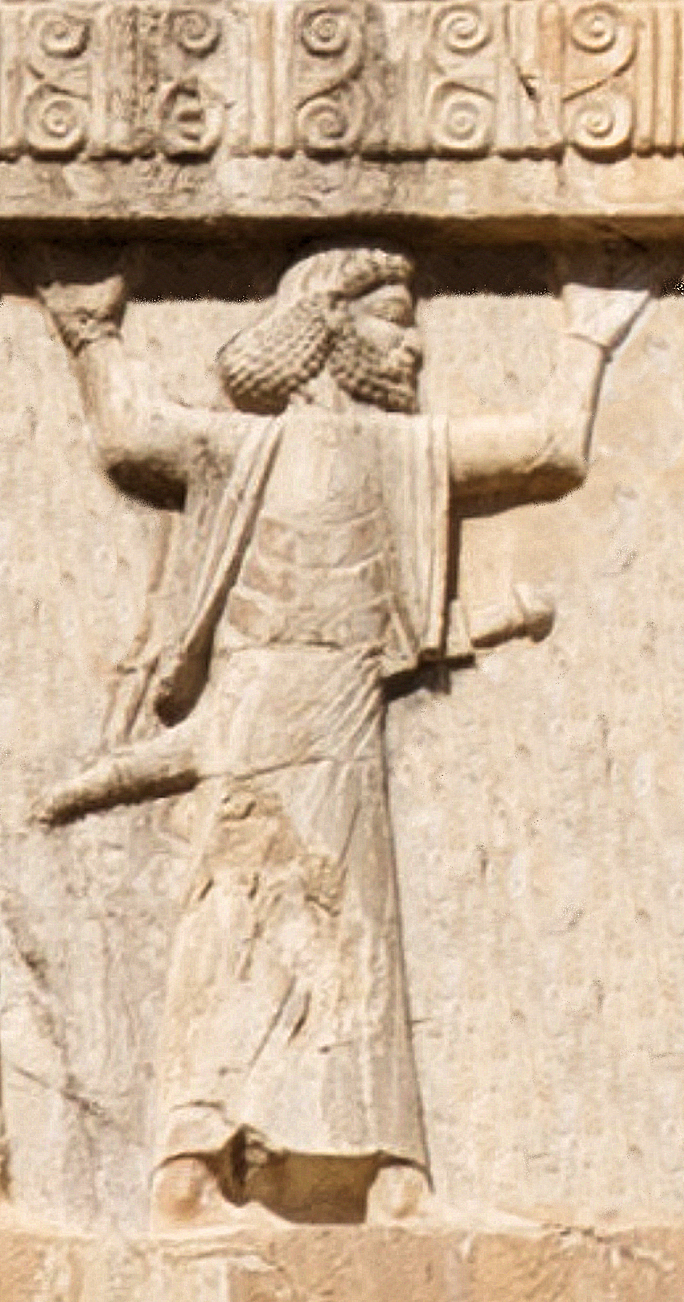
Arab soldier (Old Persian cuneiform: 𐎠𐎼𐎲𐎠𐎹, Arabāya) of the Achaemenid army, circa 480 BCE. Xerxes I tomb relief.

=== Kingdom of Qedar (8th century BCE – ?) ===
The most organized of the Northern Arabian tribes, at the height of their rule in the 6th century BCE, the Kingdom of Qedar spanned a large area between the Persian Gulf and the Sinai. An influential force between the 8th and 4th centuries BCE, Qedarite monarchs are first mentioned in inscriptions from the Assyrian Empire. Some early Qedarite rulers were vassals of that empire, with revolts against Assyria becoming more common in the 7th century BCE. It is thought that the Qedarites were eventually subsumed into the Nabataean state after their rise to prominence in the 2nd century CE.

=== The Achaemenids in Northern Arabia ===
Achaemenid Arabia corresponded to the lands between Nile Delta (Egypt) and Mesopotamia, later known to Romans as Arabia Petraea. According to Herodotus, Cambyses did not subdue the Arabs when he attacked Egypt in 525 BCE. His successor Darius the Great does not mention the Arabs in the Behistun inscription from the first years of his reign, but does mention them in later texts. That suggests that Darius might have conquered that part of Arabia or that it was originally part of another province, perhaps Achaemenid Babylonia, but later became its own province.

Arabs were not considered as subjects to the Achaemenids, as other peoples were, and were exempt from taxation. Instead, they simply provided 1,000 talents of frankincense a year. They participated in the Second Persian invasion of Greece (480-479 BCE) while also helping the Achaemenids invade Egypt by providing water skins to the troops crossing the desert.

=== Nabateans ===
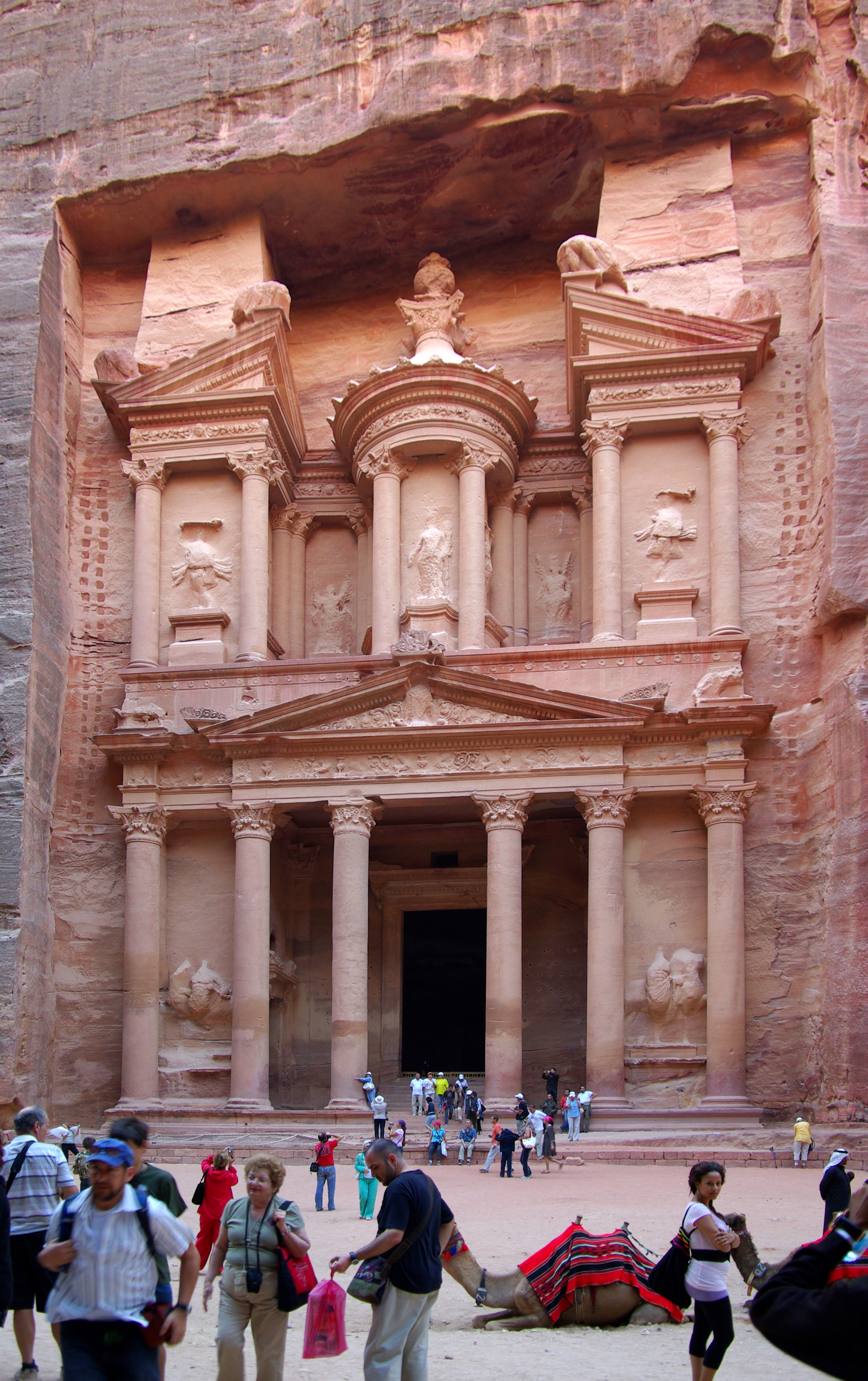
Al Khazneh in the ruins of Petra (Jordan)

The Nabataeans are first mentioned as inhabiting the area east of the Syro-African rift between the Dead Sea and the Red Sea, that is, in the land that had once been Edom. And although the first sure reference to them dates from 312 BCE, it is possible that they were present much earlier.

Josephus, writing in Jewish Antiquities 1.12.4) in the Roman era, described the descendants of Ishmael as Arabs, linking them with the Nabataeans, the tribe of Nebaioth:

twelve sons in all were born to Ishmael, Nabaioth(es), Kedar, Abdeêl, Massam, Masma, Idum(as), Masmes, Chodam, Thaiman, Jetur, Naphais, Kadmas. These occupied the whole country extending from the Euphrates to the Red Sea and called it Nabatene. And it is these who conferred their names on the Arabian nation (to tōn Arabōn ethnos) and its tribes.

The identification of the Arabs as Ishmaelites has also been expressed by Apollonius Molon and Origen, and was later adopted by Eusebius and Jerome. Classical Arab historians sometimes name Nebaioth as an ancestor of Muhammad. However the majority of traditions point to Kedar, another son of Ishmael, as his ancestor.

Petra (from the Greek petra, meaning 'of rock') lies in the Jordan Rift Valley, east of Wadi `Araba in Jordan about 80 km (50 mi) south of the Dead Sea. It came into prominence in the late 1st century BCE through the success of the spice trade. The city was the principal city of ancient Nabataea and was famous above all for two things: its trade and its hydraulic engineering systems. It was locally autonomous until the reign of Trajan, but it flourished under Roman rule. The town grew up around its Colonnaded Street in the 1st century and by the middle of the 1st century had witnessed rapid urbanization. The quarries were probably opened in this period, and there followed virtually continuous building through the 1st and 2nd centuries CE.

=== Kingdom of Hatra ===
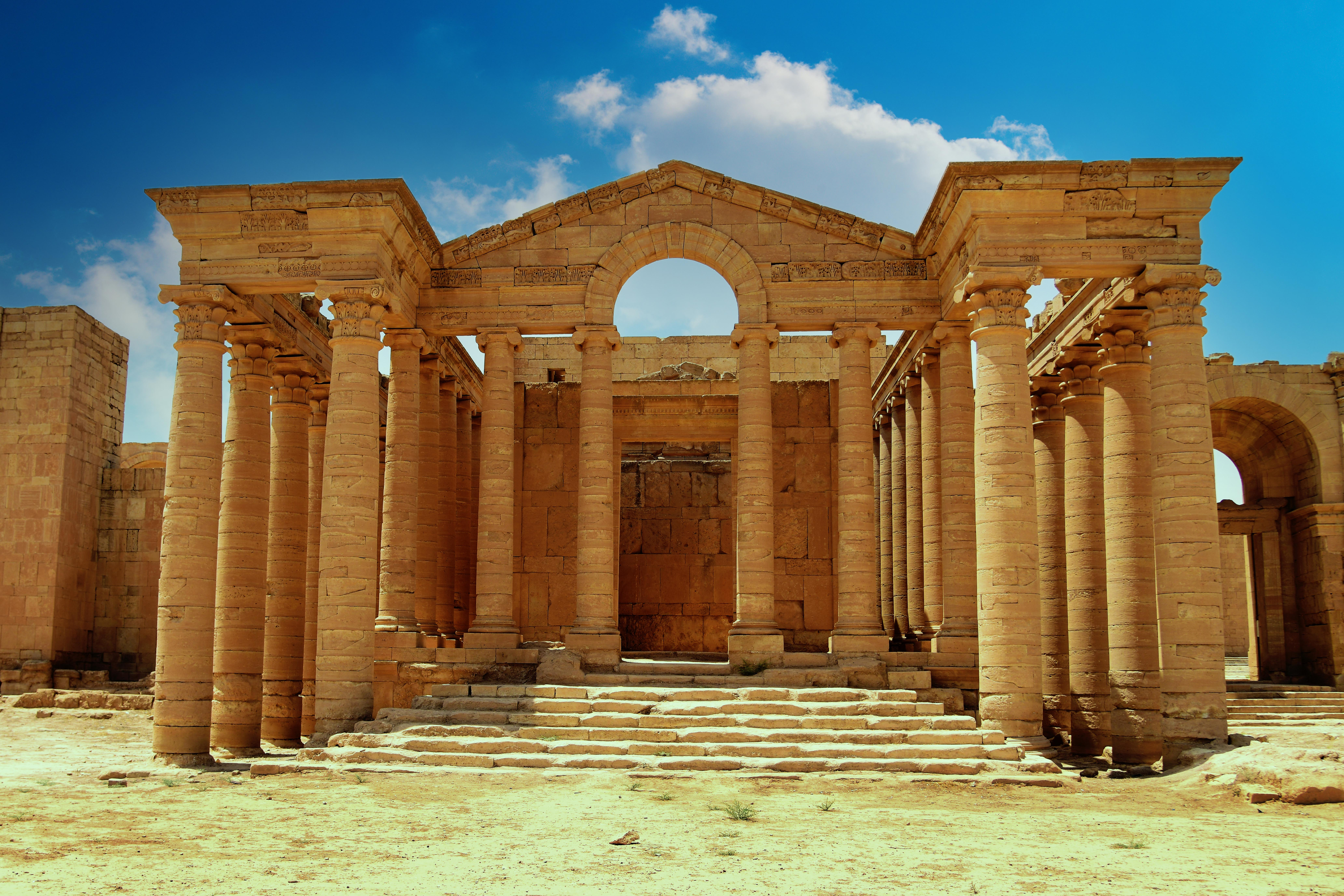
Temple of Maran, One of the temples in Hatra for Maran Shamash ("Lord of the Sun")

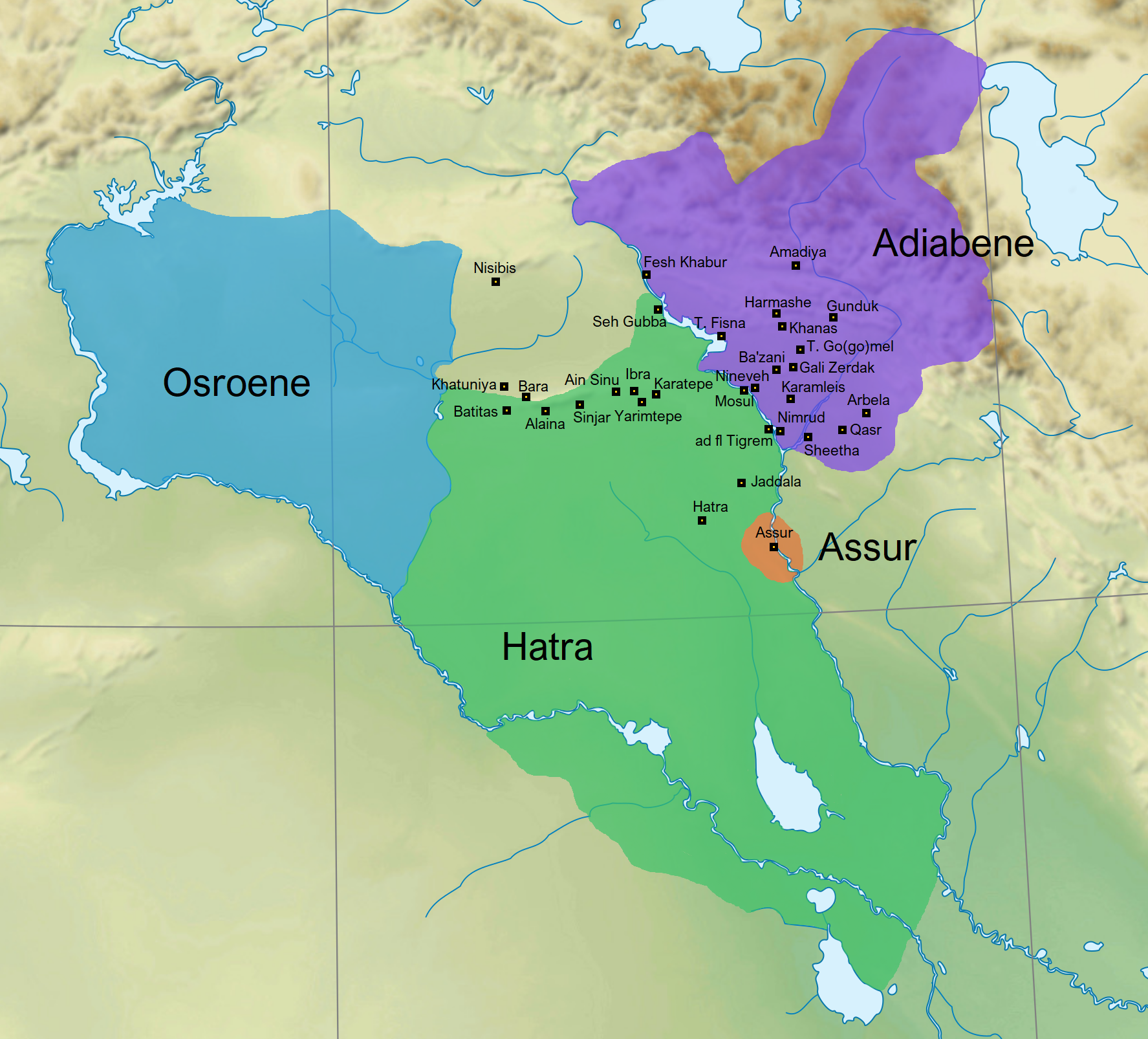
Vassal kingdoms of Hatra and Osroene under the rule of the Parthian Empire c. 200 AD

The Kingdom of Hatra (Arabic: مملكة الحضر, romanized: Mamlakat al-Ḥażr), also called Kingdom of Arabaya and Araba, was a 2nd-century Arab kingdom centered on the city of Hatra, located between the Roman and the Parthian empires, mostly under Parthian suzerainty, in modern-day northern Iraq.

In the first and second century, Hatra was ruled by a dynasty of Arab princes. It capital rose to prominence and became an important religious center as a result of its strategic position along caravan trade routes. Hatra is one of the first Arab states to be established outside of the Arabian Peninsula.

Hatra withstood repeated sieges - in the 2nd century by Roman emperors Trajan and Septimius Severus, and in the 220s by the Sasanian king Ardashir I. The kingdom was finally conquered after the 240/41 capture of its capital by the Sasanians under Shapur I, who destroyed the city.

=== Osroene and the Abgarid dynasty ===
Kingdom of Osroene (gray shade) and the surrounding regions during the 1st century AD

Osroene, or Edessa, was one of several states that acquired independence from the collapsing Seleucid Empire through the Abgarid dynasty, established by the Osrhoeni, a nomadic Nabataean tribe from Southern Canaan and North Arabia, beginning in 136 BC. Osroene's name derives from the name of that tribe or from Orhay (Urhay), the original Aramaic name of Edessa. Arab influence had been strong in the region. In his writings, Pliny the Elder refers to the natives of Osroene and Commagene as Arabs and the region as Arabia. Abgar II is called "an Arab phylarch" by Plutarch, while Abgar V is described as "king of the Arabs" by Tacitus.

The Edessene onomastic contains many Arabic names. The most common one in the ruling dynasty of Edessa being Abgar, a well-attested name among Arabic groups of antiquity. Some members of the dynasty bore Iranian names, while others had Arabic names. Judah Segal notes that the names ending in "-u" are "undoubtedly Nabatean". The Abgarid dynasts spoke "a form of Aramaic".

Abgar V is a legendary King who ruled Osroene at the time of Jesus, and is said to have been the first King to embrace Christianity. There is no doubt Christianity came early to Osroene and was widely embraced by the reign of Abgar VIII the Great (177 – 212), who was either Christian himself or not at all hostile to Christians. The Christian writer Sextus Julius Africanus (c. 160 – c. 240) stayed at Abgar the Great's court in 195, and a Christian inscription was produced in Edessa, which is from the same period or few decades later than the Inscription of Abercius from 216. It is estimated that Christianity was preached in Edessa since 160 – 170, and a flood in 201 destroyed "the temple of the church of the Christians", indicating a community large enough to have had a building of notable importance to the city at the time.

Osroene endured for four centuries, with twenty-eight rulers occasionally named "king" on their coins. Most of the kings of Osroene were called Abgar or Manu and settled in urban centers.

=== Lakhmid kingdom ===
The Lakhmid kingdom was founded in the late third century. Spanning Eastern Arabia and Southern Mesopotamia, it existed as a dependency of the Sasanian Empire, though the Lakhmids held al-Hira as their own capital city and governed from there independently. For the Sasanians, the Lakhmids served as a buffer state to protect themselves from nomadic Arab invasions, and to project their own power over Arab territories. The Lakhmids were also contenders for the Ghassanids, another major Arab tribal confederation that existed as a client state to the Byzantine Empire. The Lakhmids and the Ghassanids fought proxy wars on the part of the two empires, and assisted the empires when they entered more dire conflict.

Under the leadership of Al-Mundhir III, the power of the Lakhmids reached its height, and they reigned a devastating defeat on the Romans and the Ghassanids at the Battle of Callinicum, to the point that the Romans paid them tribute to avoid invasion. However, the apogee declined after the death of Al-Mundhir III. The Lakhmids became weak in the second half of the sixth century, leading to issues to them with the Persians. The final Lakhmid king, Al-Nu'man III, was converted to Christianity as the religion grew at Al-Hira. Years later, as the Sasanians sought to take direct control over their borders with Arab groups, Al-Nu'man III was deposed by the Sasanians themselves around 602 AD, bringing an end to the Lakhmid kingdom.

=== Ghassanid kingdom ===
The Ghassanid kingdom was a major Arab tribal confederation founded in the early third century. Early on, the Ghassanids converted to Christianity, and formed a cliental relationship with the Roman Empire, and later the Eastern Roman (Byzantine) Empire. They served as rivals for the Lakhmid kingdom, the vassals of the Persian Sasanian Empire. Like the Lakhmids, they acted as a buffer state, preventing Arab nomadic incursion (into Byzantine territory) and playing the role of projecting the power of the empire into Arabian lands. They were ultimately deoposd by the Byzantines in the late 6th century and ceased to be an entity during the early Muslim conquests.

== Central Arabia ==
=== Kingdom of Kinda ===
Kinda was an Arab kingdom by the Kinda tribe; the tribe's existence dates back to the second century BCE. The Kindites established a kingdom in Najd in Central Arabia unlike the organized states of Yemen; its kings exercised an influence over a number of associated tribes more by personal prestige than by coercive settled authority. Their first capital is called Qaryat al-Faw, then known as Qaryat Dhāt Kāhil. According to Islamic tradition, Kindite supremacy over Central Arabia collapsed after the First Battle of Kulab.

Ancient South Arabian inscriptions mention a tribe settling in Najd called kdt, who had a king called rbˁt (Rabi'ah) from ḏw ṯwr-m (the people of Thawr), who had sworn allegiance to the king of Saba' and Dhū Raydān. Since later Arab genealogists trace Kinda back to a person called Thawr ibn 'Uqayr, modern historians have concluded that this rbˁt ḏw ṯwrm (Rabī'ah of the People of Thawr) must have been a king of Kinda (kdt); the Musnad inscriptions mention that he was king both of kdt (Kinda) and qhtn (Qaḥṭān). They played a major role in the Himyarite-Ḥaḑramite war. Following the Himyarite victory, a branch of Kinda established themselves in the Marib region, while the majority of Kinda remained in their lands in central Arabia.

In the mid-sixth century, the Byzantine emperor Justinian wanted to spread his influence over the Arabian Peninsula, in competition with the growing role of the Sasanians in the region. Justinian sent the ambassador Nonnosus to meet with the leadership of Central Arabia, a king named Kaïsos (Greek: Καισος, Arabic: Qays), the nephew of Aretha (Greek: Άρεθα, Arabic: Ḥārith), who is said to rule over both the Khindynoi (Greek Χινδηνοι), or Kinda, and the Maadynoi (Greek: Μααδηνοι), or the Ma'add, the two most important tribes in the area in terms of territory and number. He calls the king of Kinda Kaïsos (Greek: Καισος, Arabic: Qays). Kinda's leadership met Justinian at the Byzantine royal court, and agreed to become his clients, receiving the title of phylarch, like that of the other rulers of Byzantium's Arab client-states, such as the Ghassanids.

=== Ma'add confederation ===
Ma'add was a group of nomadic and semi-nomadic groups occupying central Arabia, beyond the territorial domain of the major powers of its day: north of the direct territorial control of the Himyarite Kingdom, and south of that of the Lakhmids. The Ma'addites maintained independence from the empires and kingdoms to their north and south by living in remote areas and arranging militarized societies. In the 4th–6th centuries, their center was at a site called Ma'sal al‐Jumh in the Najd.

In Islamic times, Ma'add was transformed into a folkloric ancestor for all Arabs. As time passed on, Arab genealogy expanded, and Ma'add was reduced to being an ancestor of some of the "northern" Arabs.

== Economy and trade ==
The economy and trade of pre-Islamic Arabia refers to the land- and sea-trade networks used by the inhabitants of Pre-Islamic Arabia, both inter-regionally (between different regions of Arabia) and internationally. Famously, the Arabian Peninsula, situated between the Levant, Mesopotamia, Persia, Egypt, and the Horn of Africa, is known for its role in the ancient incense trade route, which saw the movement of spices across regions as distant as India to Europe. The documentation of trade in the region goes back to the 3rd millennium BC, where Dilmun, a civilization covering most of Eastern Arabia, was known in Mesopotamian traders as a legendary source of wealth and goods in the Bronze Age.

== Interactions with foreign civilizations ==
=== Romans ===
Shortly after the Roman annexation of Egypt in the aftermath of the Battle of Alexandria (30 BC), the Roman emperor Augustus (27 BCE – 14 CE) set his eyes on the Arabian Peninsula, and ordered the Prefect of Egypt, Aelius Gallus, on an expedition. Gallus invaded the south and captured major cities including Najran and Baraqish, but during his siege of Marib, he ultimately had to return because of a growing number of problems besetting the expedition, especially a water shortage.

In 106, the Romans conquered the Nabataean Kingdom, whose territory spanned parts of Syria, Jordan, and the northwest of the Peninsula. with its capital at Petra. The conquest led to the creation of the new province of Arabia Petraea, sometimes known as Roman Arabia. The desert frontier of Arabia Petraea, representing the borders between Roman and Arabian territory, was called by the Romans the Limes Arabicus. At the height of the Roman encroachment into the peninsula, regions of the northern Hejaz, particularly the city of Hegra (Mada'in Saleh), came under Roman occupation in the second, third, and early fourth centuries CE, attested by the Ruwafa inscriptions and archaeological finds. In the fourth century onwards, the Romans pulled back to Arabia Petraea, preferring indirect rule through proxy Arab tribal confederations, like the Ghassanids.

In the sixth century, guided by the expansionist policies of the Byzantine emperor Justinian and to counter Sasanian influence over Eastern Arabia and the Persian Gulf, the Romans began to more directly re-assert themselves in the Arabian Peninsula. The Tiran Island, part of modern-day Saudi Arabia, and located between the Arabian and Sinai peninsulas, came under direct Roman rule. Within a few years, Justinian established a client network across the coast of Western Arabia, Central Arabia, and attempted to bring Himyar (the South Arabian kingdom) and Aksum (the Ethiopian kingdom) under his sway. Justinian sent an ambassador and diplomat, Nonnosus, to Kaisos, the joint ruler over the Kingdom of Kinda and Ma'add (a major tribal confederation), which were the main powers in Central Arabia. Nonnosus convinced Kaisos to come to the Byzantine capital, and there, Justinian negotiated Kaisos to agreeing to become a phylarch of over Palestinian territories, with his brothers becoming Justinian's client rulers over Central Arabia. Justinian is also said to have been given rule over the "Palm Grove" (either Hegra or Tayma) by its leader Abu Karib, who Justinian in turn made phylarch over the region. Another emperor, whose identity is not clear, had (according to Islamic tradition) the tribal confederation of Mudar, which ruled over the Hejaz, as one of its clients and participated with it in joint military ventures. Mudar helped the Byzantines fight the Sasanians, while the Byzantines helped Mudar capture Mecca.

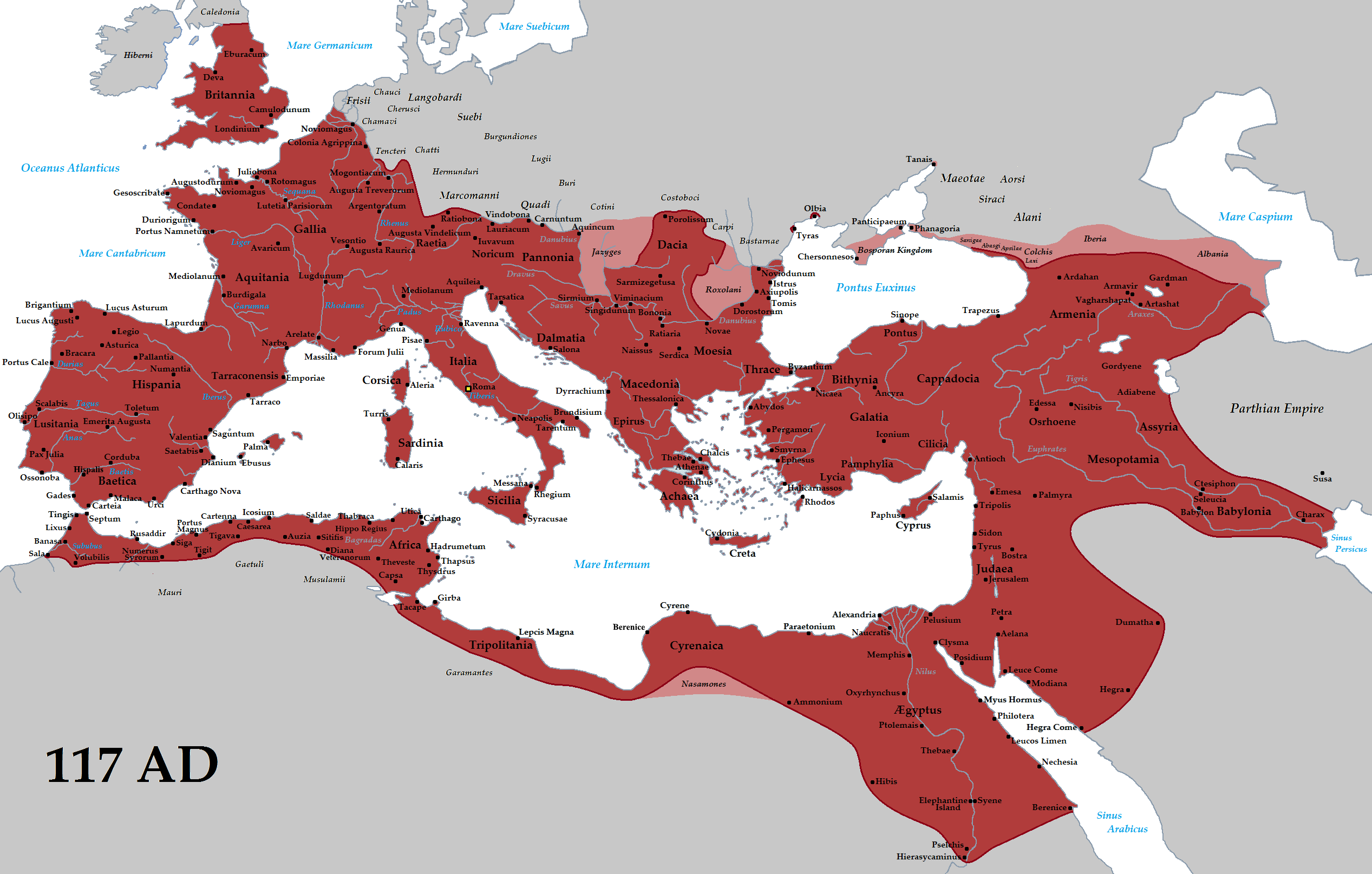
Map showing Roman emperor Trajan control of northwestern Arabia until Hegra (actual Mada'in Saleh)

=== Persians ===
The Persian empires, during both its Parthian and Sasanian phases, had a long history and presence in the Arabian Peninsula, especially Eastern Arabia, located immediately across of Iran after crossing the Persian Gulf, and Oman. In the 3rd century, the Lakhmid kingdom emerged and became the main Arab client-state of the Sasanians for extending their hegemony into those areas of the peninsula. That allowed the Persians to exert their power without a direct presence, although sometimes, they also directly operated in the peninsula; in 2019, a late antique Sasanian fort was discovered in the Batinah Plain of Oman at Fulayj. In the late 6th century, the Sasanian strategy changed as Himyar, the long-dominant power over South Arabia, began to crumble: through the Aksumite–Persian wars, the Sasanian Empire also ruled over South Arabia. In Arabic memory, the Battle of Dhu Qar in the early years of the seventh century is usually seen as the turning point and when Arab tribes were no longer militarily subordinate to the Sasanians.

The Hejaz, without being annexed into Sasanian territory, was often the subject of the soft power of the Sasanians through economic and political means, ever since its establishment in the third century, through the Lakhmids. The Šahrestānīhā ī Ērānšahr, a Middle Persian document, places the region with both Mecca and Medina in the domain of the Iranian empire during the third century. Medina may have been directly controlled, at one point, by Khosrow I, who is said to have appointed the Lakhmid king Al-Mundhir III (r. 569–581) over all Arabs living between, on the one side, Oman, Bahrain, and Al-Yamama, and to the other side, Al-Ta'if and the rest of the Hejaz. A Sasanian governor, whose main seat was on the coast of the Persian Gulf, is said to have indirectly ruled Medina and Tihama, and where he was represented by an official called an ʿamīl. Banu Qurayza and Banu Nadir, two Jewish tribes, were said to have exacted tribute from two other tribes, Banu Aws and Banu Khazraj, on account of the Sasanians. Some sources also suggest a Sasanian presence in the Najd and Yemen to extract mineral resources, which would have involved Sasanian servicemen and laborers in the region with local involvement to operate. Evidence is from the Crowns from the Accounts of the Yemen and the Genealogies of Himyar by Al-Hamdani, which transmits family names from those regions, some of which are Middle Persian. Earlier, Kavad I is said to have attempted promoting Mazdakism in the same area.

In the second half of the sixth century, it is said that the Lakhmid ruler Al-Nu'man III (r. 582–602) appointed a king, ʿAmr b. al-Itnaba from the Khazraj, over Medina. Later, the Sasanians conquered South Arabia and replaced rule by the Kingdom of Aksum. The Sasanian Emperor Khosrow II may have considered Mecca to be part of his domain, as he is said to have sent a governor to Mecca from Yamama over collecting taxes.

=== Ethiopia and the Horn of Africa ===
Ethiopia, and the Horn of Africa at large, is found south-west of the Arabian Peninsula, separated only by the Red Sea. Contact, trade, and even warfare between Arabian and civilizations in the Horn (including parts of modern-day Ethiopia, Eritrea and Somalia) dates at least to the early 1st millennium BC, when the Sabaean Kingdom may have established a state in parts of modern-day Eritrea and Ethiopia, called Da'amat, although the precise nature of the Sabaean cultural presence in the area is debated.

After the collapse of Da'amat, contact between South Arabia and Ethiopia declined. It was revitalized after the establishment of the Kingdom of Aksum, a new and powerful Ethiopian kingdom centred on Eritrea and Ethiopia emerging in the 1st century CE. Contact, and occasional battle, continued between the two, for centuries. Ethiopia maintained a policy of irredentism since it believed that the southern territories of the peninsula rightfully belonged to its own rule. The Kingdom of Aksum conquered South Arabia in the early 6th century, and Ethiopian rule over South Arabia reached its height during the reign of Abraha, which conquered most of the peninsula. Control was finally lost to the Sasanian Empire during the Aksumite–Persian wars.

== Genealogical tradition ==
A map published by the British academic Harold Dixon during World War I, showing the presence of the Arab tribes in West Asia, 1914

Arab traditions relating to the origins and classification of the Arabian tribes is based on biblical genealogy. The general consensus among 14th-century Arab genealogists was that Arabs were three kinds:

1. "Perishing Arabs", the ancients of whose history little is known. They include ʿĀd, Thamud, Tasm, Jadis, Imlaq and others. Jadis and Tasm perished because of genocide. ʿĀd and Thamud perished because of their decadence. Some people in the past doubted their existence, but Imlaq is the singular form of 'Amaleeq and is probably synonymous to the biblical Amalek.
2. "Pure Arabs" (Qahtanite), traditionally considered to have originated from the progeny of Ya'rub bin Yashjub bin Qahtan, they were thus also called Qahtanite Arabs.
3. "Arabized Arabs" (Adnanite), traditionally seen as having descended from Adnan.

Modern historians believe that the distinctions were created during the Umayyad period to support the causes of different political factions.

== Religion ==
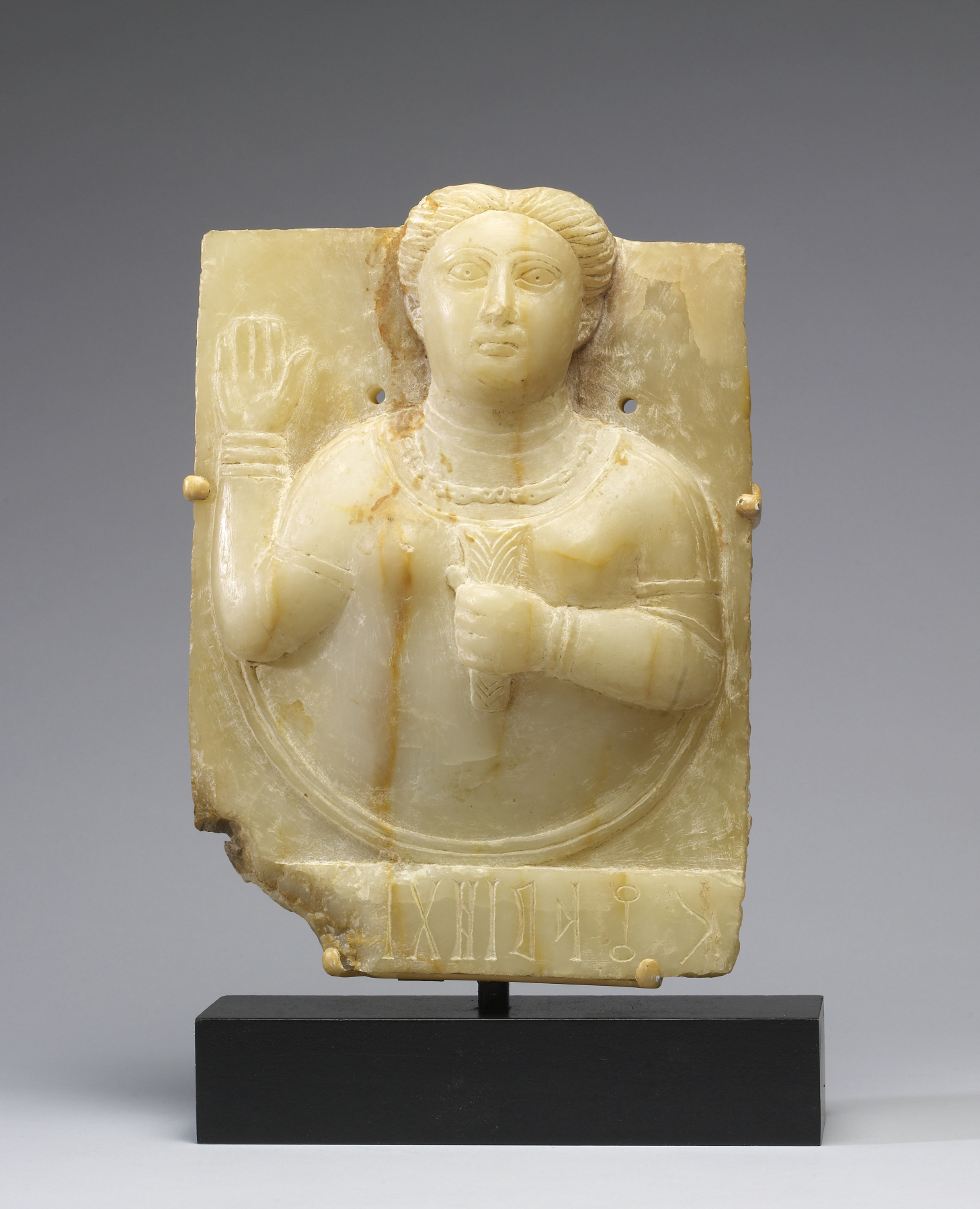
Rising from a roundel, the sculpture represents a priestess who intercedes with the sun goddess on behalf of the donor, Rathadum

Religion in pre-Islamic Arabia included pre-Islamic Arabian polytheism, ancient Semitic religions, and Abrahamic religions such as Judaism and Christianity. Other religions that may have existed in pre-Islamic Arabia are Samaritanism, Mandaeism, and Iranian religions like Zoroastrianism and Manichaeism. Arabian polytheism was, according to Islamic tradition, the dominant form of religion in pre-Islamic Arabia, based on veneration of deities and spirits. Worship was directed to various gods and goddesses, including Hubal and the goddesses al-Lāt, Al-'Uzzá and Manāt, at local shrines and temples, maybe such as the Kaaba in Mecca. Deities were venerated and invoked through a variety of rituals, including pilgrimages and divination, as well as ritual sacrifice. Different theories have been proposed regarding the role of Allah in Meccan religion. Many of the physical descriptions of the pre-Islamic gods are traced to idols, especially near the Kaaba, which is said to have contained up to 360 of them in Islamic tradition.

Other religions were represented to varying, lesser degrees. The influence of the adjacent Roman and Aksumite resulted in Christian communities in the northwest, northeast and south of Arabia. Christianity in pre-Islamic Arabia made a lesser impact, but secured some conversions, in the remainder of the peninsula. With the exception of Nestorianism in the northeast and the Persian Gulf, the dominant form of Christianity was Miaphysitism. The peninsula had been a destination for Jewish migration since pre-Roman times, which had resulted in a diaspora community supplemented by local converts. Additionally, the influence of the Sasanian Empire resulted in Iranian religions being present in the peninsula. While Zoroastrianism existed in the eastern and southern Arabia, there was no existence of Manichaeism in Mecca. From the fourth-century onwards, monotheism became increasingly prevalent in pre-Islamic Arabia, as is attested in texts like the inscriptions from Jabal Dabub, Ri al-Zallalah, and the Abd Shams inscription.

== Culture ==
=== Literacy ===
Michael C.A. MacDonald classifies societies as literate or non-literate based on the role played by writing in that society. Writing may be widespread, but if it is not involved in the administration of a society (contracts, treaties, letters and diplomacy, monumental inscriptions etc.), it is considered non-literate. By contrast, a literate society relies on writing for its administration. Contrary to myth, the ability to read and write was common in pre-Islamic Arabia, and pre-Islamic Arabia at large represented a literate society.

Writing was used to different extents in different regions of the Peninsula. South Arabia was a literate society to the most extensive degree. Thousands of graffiti are known, which suggests that commoners knew how to write at a basic level. Also, thousands of public inscriptions show that writing was used also to run South Arabian societies, across all ranges of purposes (legal, commemorative, and dedicatory) as well as to issue public decrees and document history and legal affairs. The major oases towns in North and West Arabia were also literate societies. The northern nomadic Arabs were non-literate societies, but the tens of thousands of pre-Islamic Arabian inscriptions found even among those societies suggest that the ability to write was common and that it was used mainly for entertainment and passing time.

=== Literature ===
No native literature survives from pre-Islamic Arabia, however, over 65,000 pre-Islamic inscriptions have been found on stone, metal, pottery, wood, and other surfaces, and published. The inscriptions suggest a copious literature once existed in the area, but it has not survived, likely because it was written on perishable materials.

Most of the inscriptions are from North Arabia, where 50,000 inscriptions are known. The remaining 15,000 are from South Arabia. The Arabian corpus of inscriptions is more extensive than that of Ugarit or Phoenicia in Punic, Aramaic, and Hebrew. It is second in size only to Akkadian but remains behind in the field of Semitic studies because of a lack of accessible tools.

While not written down in the pre-Islamic period, the period may have had a vibrant poetic culture.

=== Greek and Roman cultural influence ===
Parts of pre-Islamic Arabia was influenced by Greeks, a process that refers to when local cultures mix with the Greco-Roman culture spread by Alexander the Great's conquests. After Alexander's fall, and before reaching the Arabian Peninsula, Hellenistic and Roman rule were imposed for centuries on Arabic-speaking populations in Syria, the Jordan, and Palestine.

Hellenization first reaches the peninsula in the 3rd century BC, in Eastern Arabia, shown by the amphorae in that region that came from Rhodes and Chios. In South Arabia, Hellenization begins in the 2nd or 1st centuries BCE, around the time of the last of the kings of Qataban. In the resurgent period of the South Arabian Kingdom of Awsan, during the 2nd or 1st centuries BCE, an evolution of the iconography of the kings is seen: they are transformed from wearing traditional South Arabian clothing to being shown dressed as a Roman citizen would, with curly hair and wearing a toga. At the Kingdom of Saba, the traditional Near Eastern norms of religious iconography gave way to Roman and Hellenistic anthropomorphic styles around the turn of the Christian era. In Central Arabia, statues of Greek deities like Artemis, Heracles, and Harpocrates have been discovered have been found at Qaryat al-Faw, the former capital of the Kingdom of Kinda. Roman military presence, coins, and Greek and Latin inscriptions have been documented in many sites in Saudi Arabia, including invocations of Roman gods in the northwestern Hejaz. Many Arabic inscriptions mention the emperor (as Caesar) and Rome or Romans, citing them with the words rm, ʾl rm, or hrm. One Arabic inscription accompanies a rock drawing of a Roman soldier in a plumed helmet and lamellar armor on horseback.

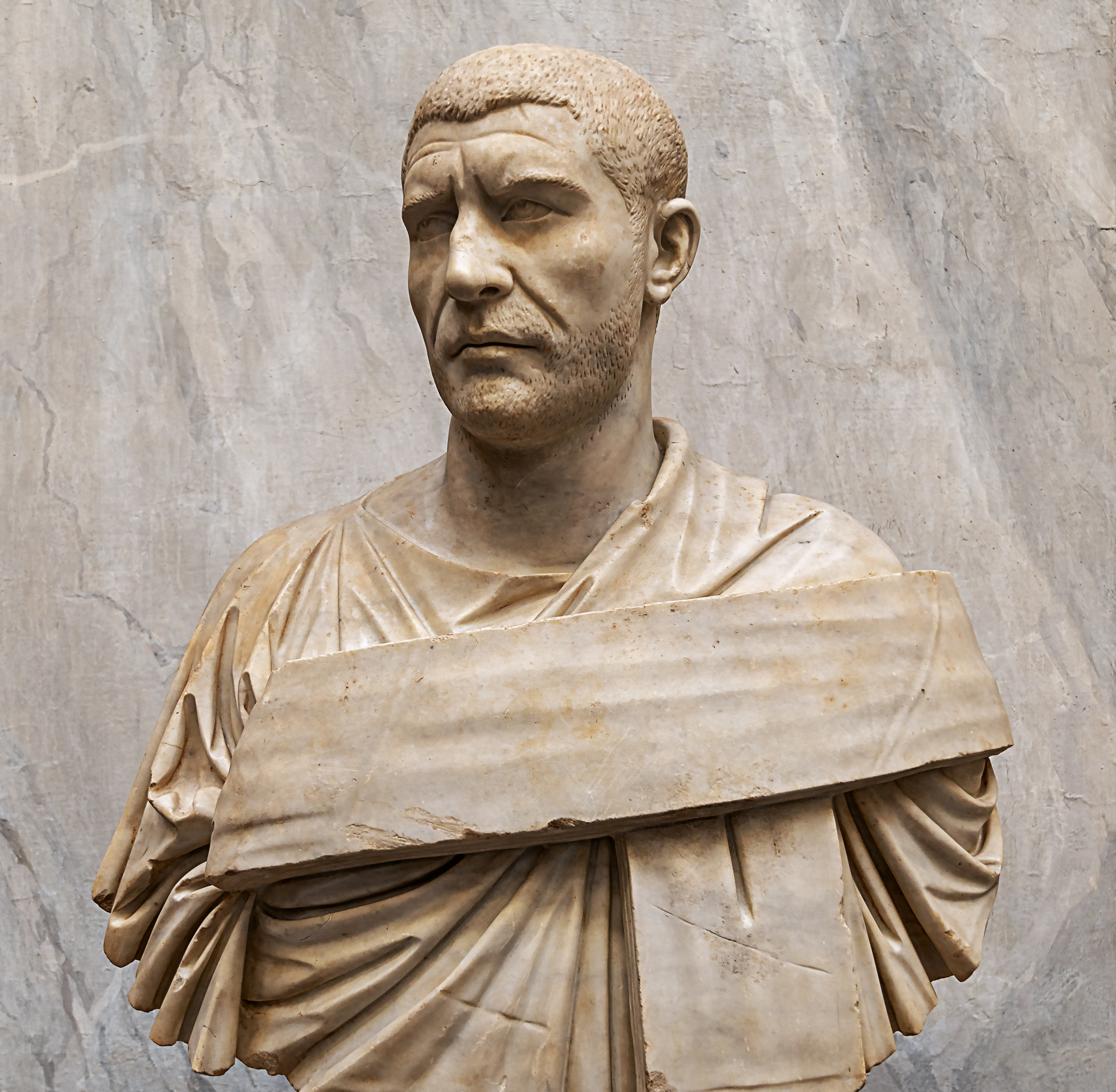
Bust of the Roman emperor Philip the Arab

In 106 CE, the Roman Empire conquered the Nabataean Kingdom and they set up a province called Arabia Petraea (Roman Arabia) encompassing both northern Arabia and the northwest Hejaz. Roman military encampments were set up at Hegra (Mada'in Salih) in the Medina Province, at Ruwafa, and as far south as the Farasan Islands. The Limes Arabicus was the desert frontier that separated the Roman Empire from the rest of the Arabian Peninsula.

Christianity expanded into pre-Islamic Arabia. The Letter of the Archimandrites dating to 569/570, composed in Greek but preserved in Syriac, demonstrates a dense network of churches and monasteries in Roman Arabia. Arabic-speaking tribes were gradually converting to Christianity or becoming foederati of the emperor, resulting in increasing integration into the Roman world over time. In the mid-sixth century, for example, Justinian I was closely allied with the Ghassanids, a Hellenized Christian Arab kingdom.

=== Art ===
The art is similar to that of neighbouring cultures. Pre-Islamic Yemen produced stylized alabaster (the most common material for sculpture) heads of great aesthetic and historic charm.

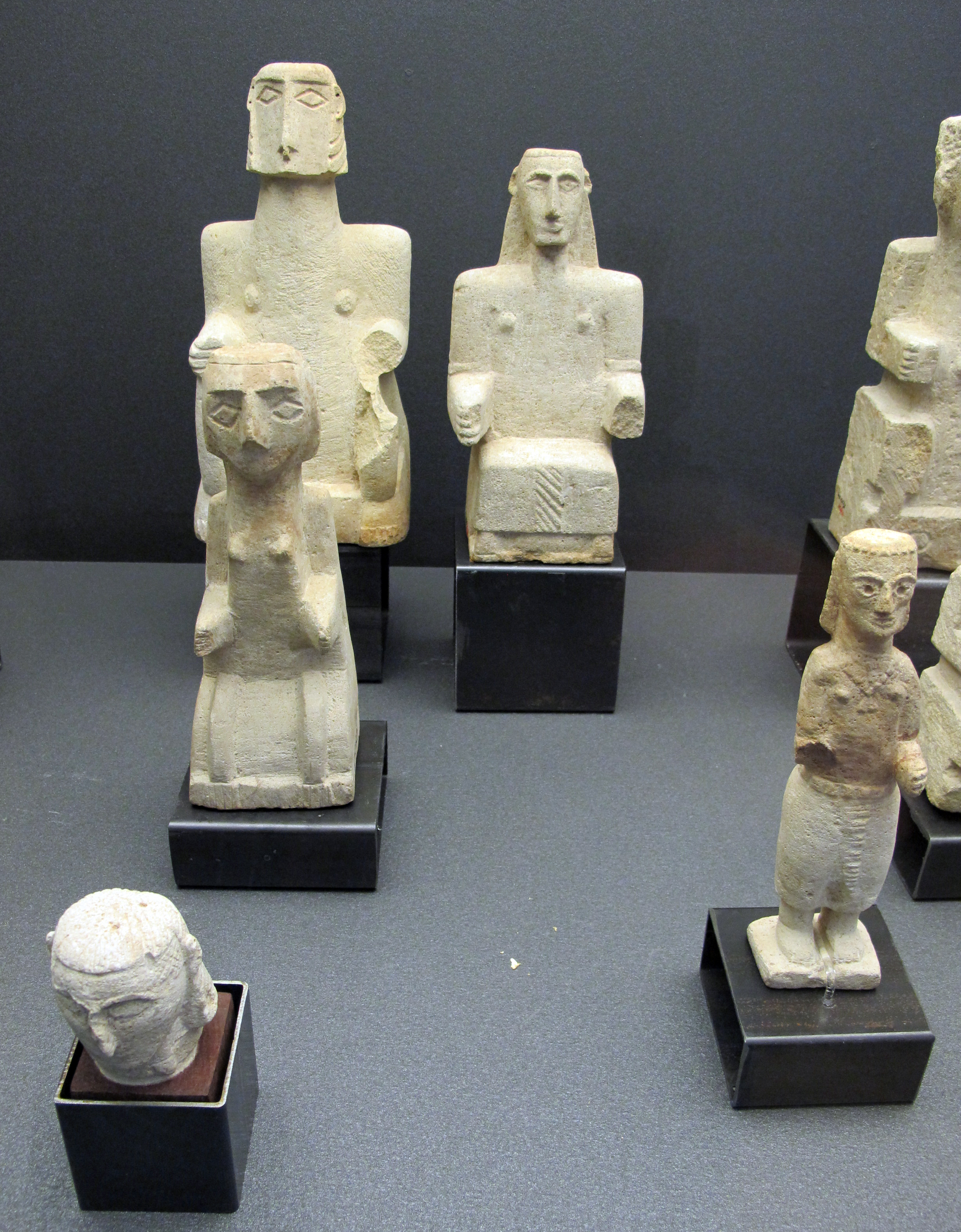
Votive alabaster figurines from Yemen that represent seated women and female heads; 3rd-1st century BC; National Museum of Oriental Art (Rome, Italy)

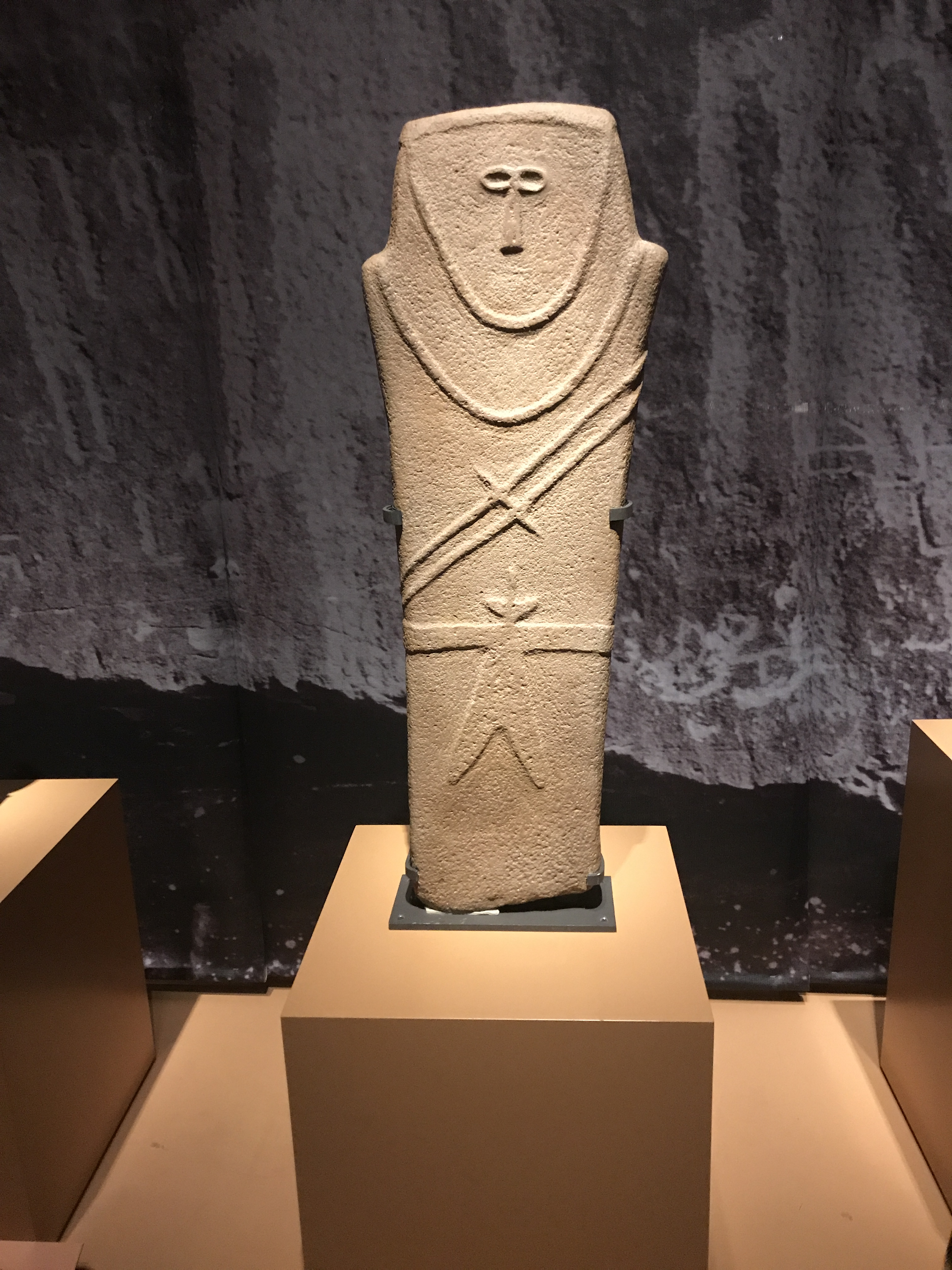
Stele, male wearing a baldric – an iconic artwork for pre-Islamic Arabia; 4th millennium BCE, Al-'Ula (Saudi Arabia); exhibition at the National Museum of Korea (Seoul)

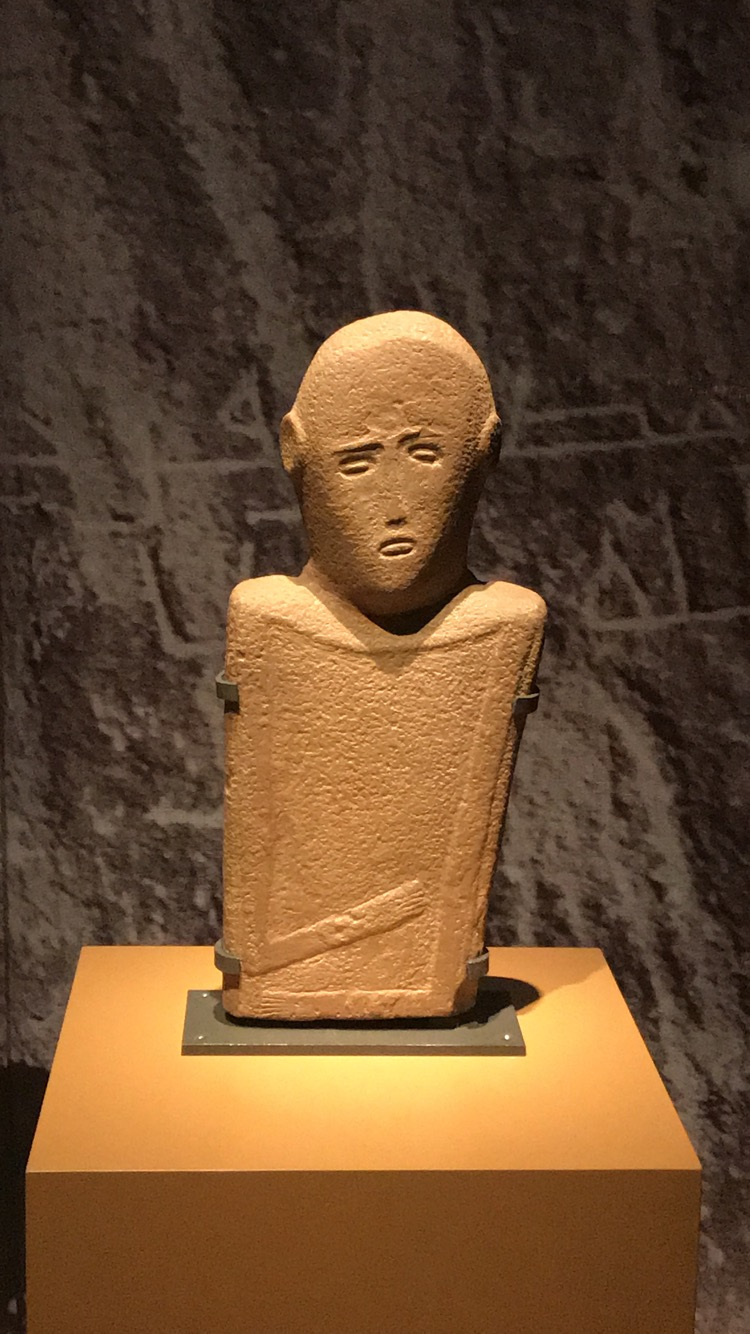
Another anthropomorphic stele from pre-Islamic Saudi Arabia

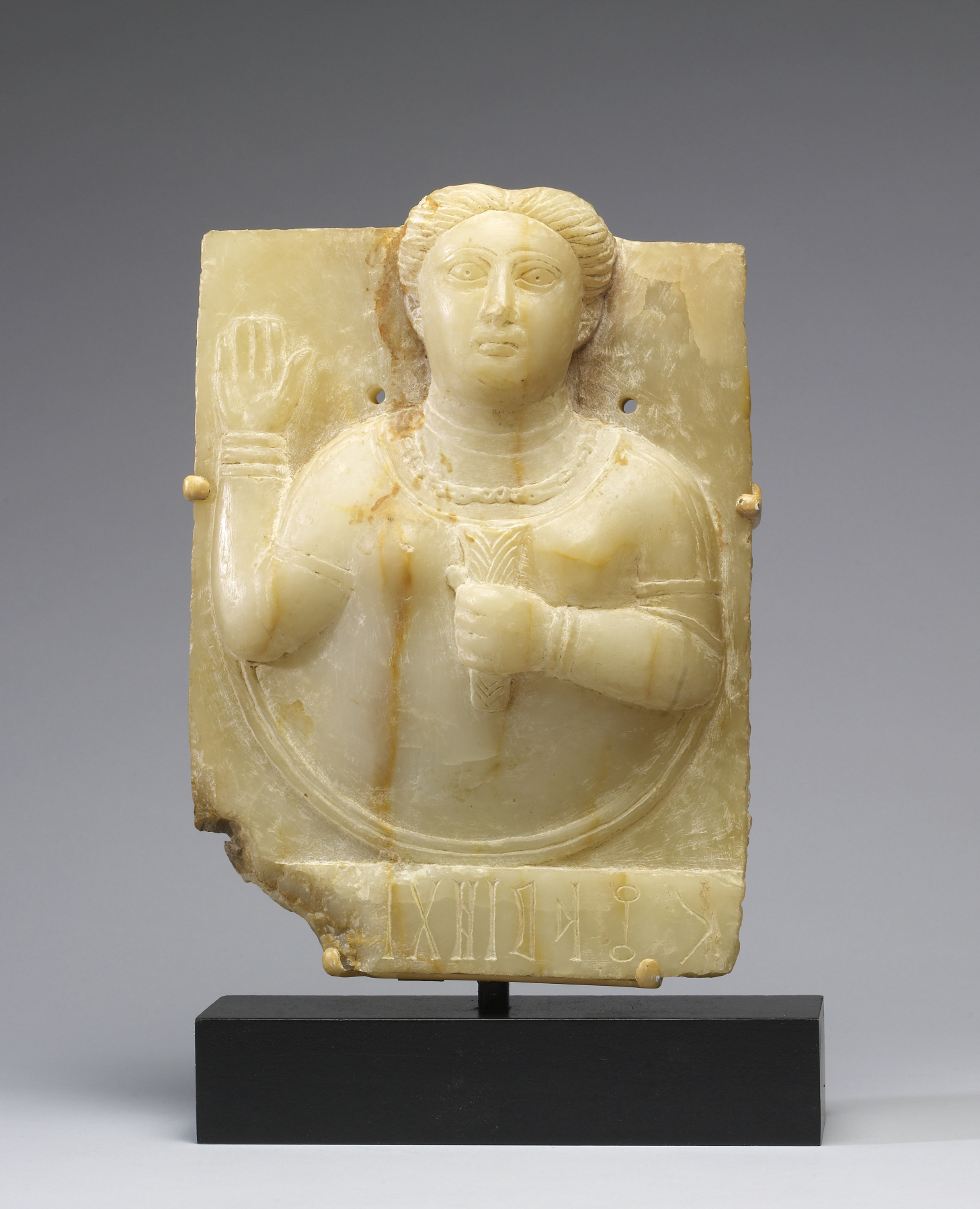
South Arabian stele, bust of female raising her hand, with the donor's name, Rathadum, written below; 1st century BC-1st century AD; calcite-alabaster; 32.1 cm (12.6 in) x 23.3 cm (9.1 in) x 3.5 cm (1.3 in); Walters Art Museum (Baltimore).

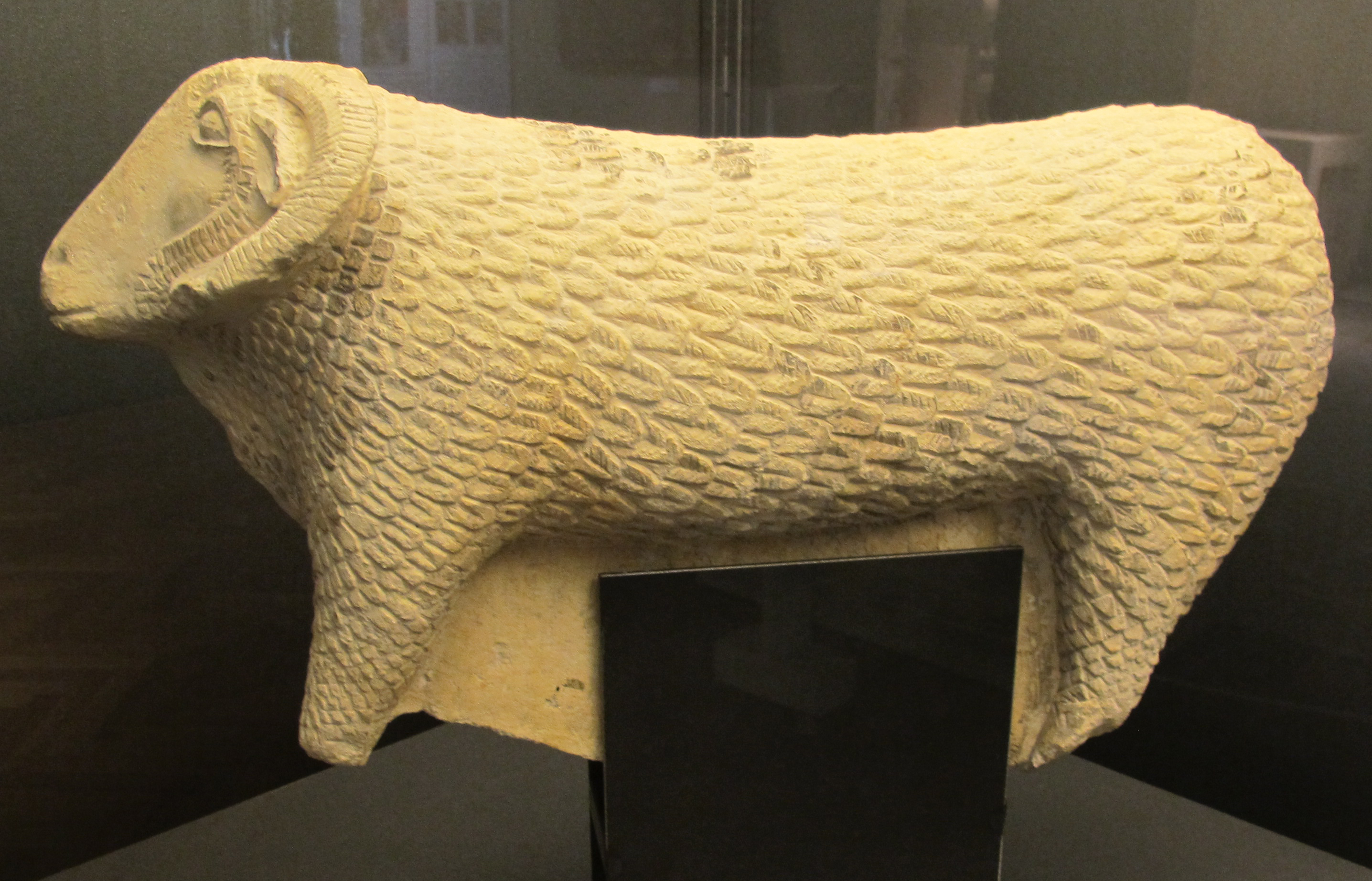
Limestone sculpture from pre-Islamic Yemen that represents a ram

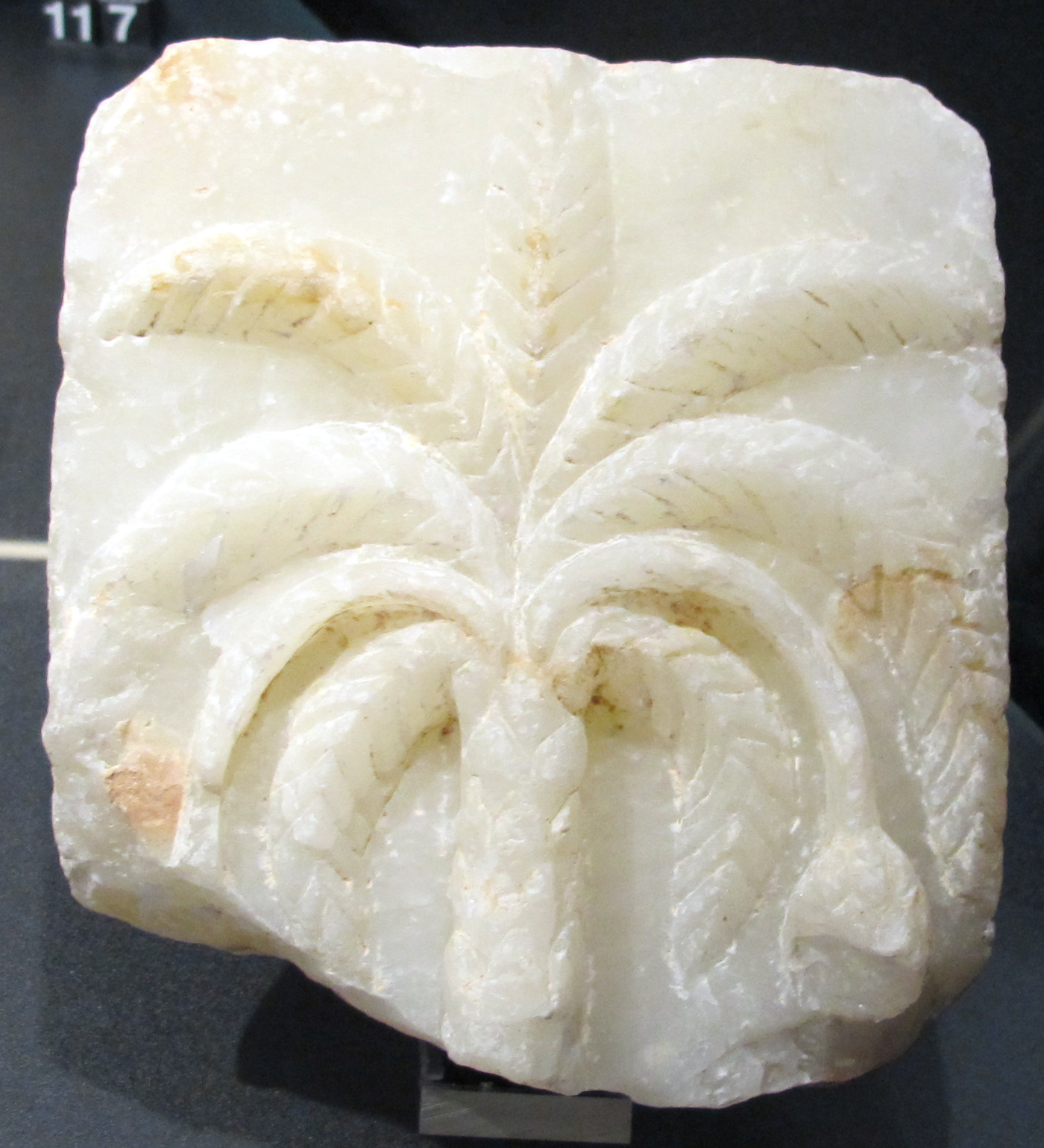
Bas-relief with a palm tree; Sana'a, ancient Yemen, alabaster.

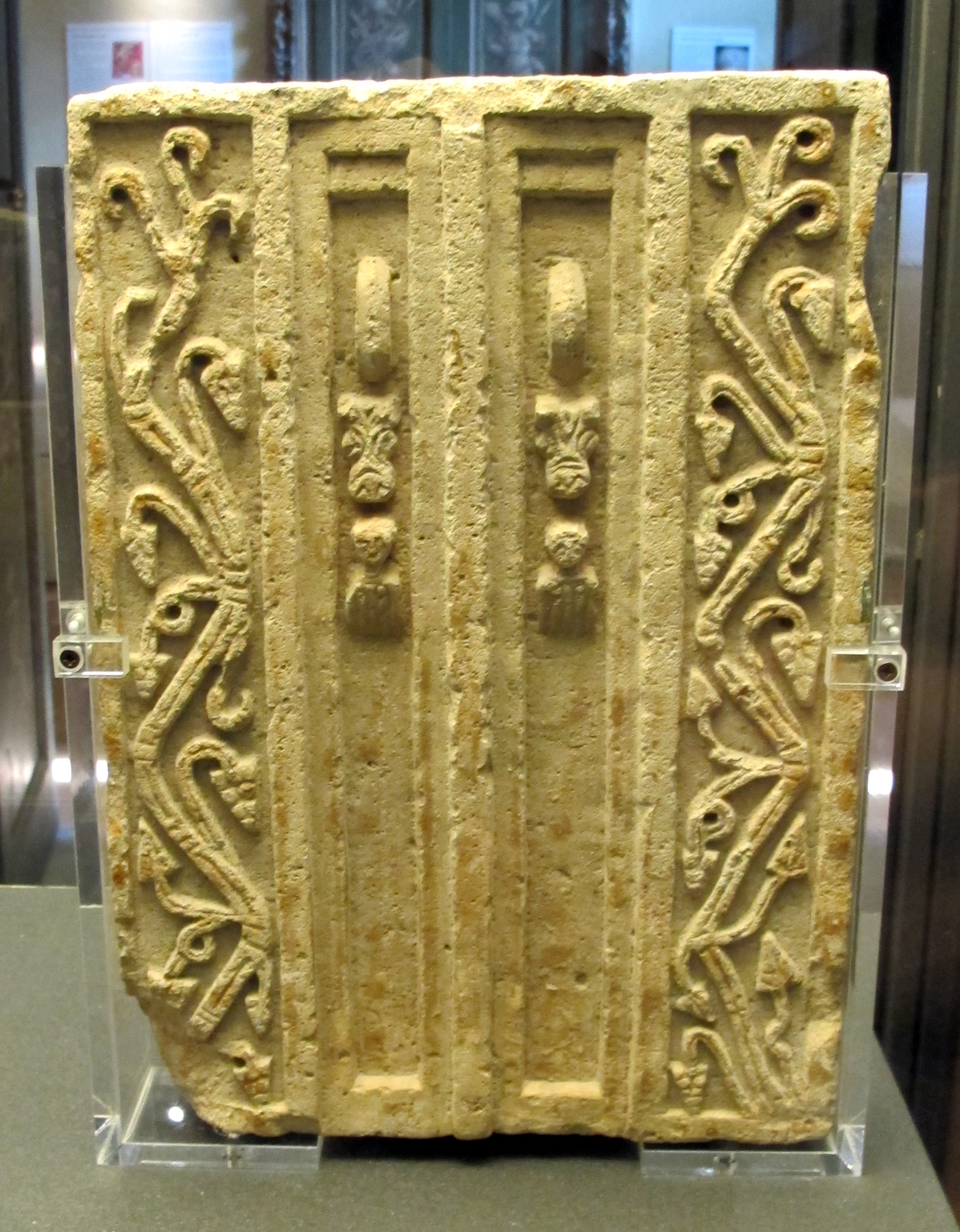
Miniature gate; Zafar, Yemen, 2nd-3rd century AD.

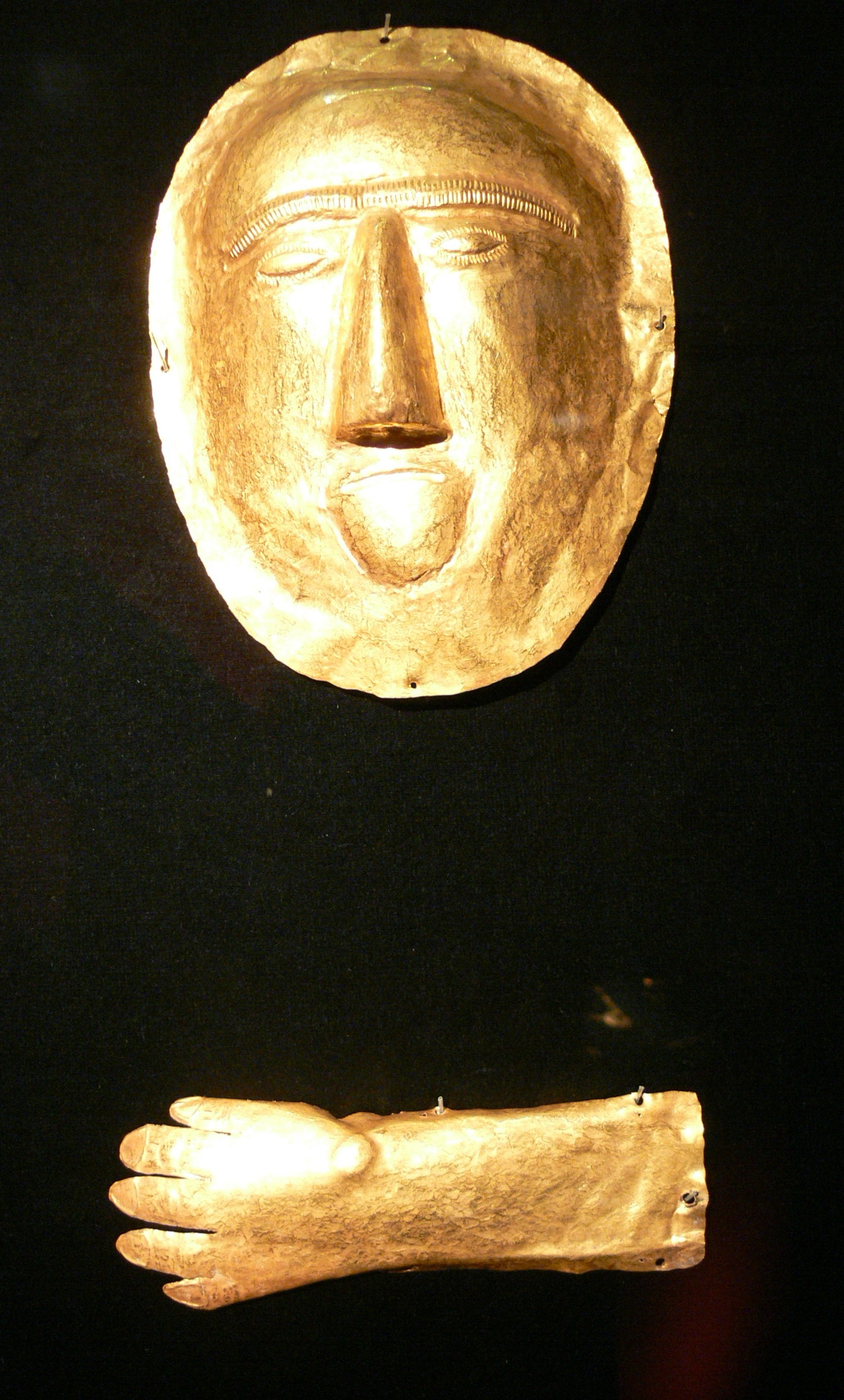
Pergamon Museum (Berlin). Exhibition "Roads of Arabia": Funeral mask and glove (1st century AD), gold, from Thaj, Tell Al-Zayer (National Museum, Riyadh)

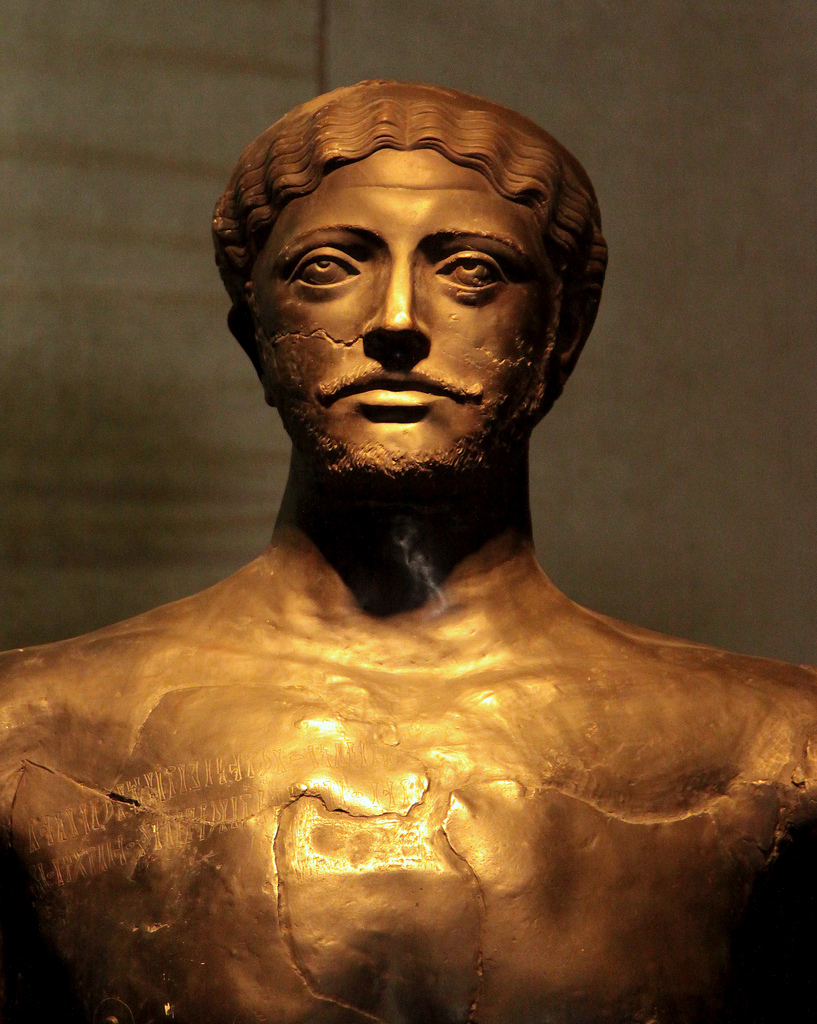
Dhamar Ali Yahbur II, King of Himyarite

== Late antiquity ==
In late antiquity, Arabia was increasingly drawn into the political, religious, commercial, and literary worlds of the wider Near East. The period saw the spread of Christianity, Judaism, and new forms of monotheistic and henotheistic piety; the wider use of Arabic and the development and spread of the Arabic script; the rise of Arab political leadership along the Byzantine and Sasanian frontiers through the Ghassanids and the Lakhmids; and the growth of prophetic and monotheist movements in the generations and contemporary to the rise of Islam.

=== Religious change ===
Modern historians have found that religious life in late antique Arabia cannot be reduced to a simple contrast between polytheism and Islam. In South Arabia, the rulers of Himyar adopted a monotheistic royal ideology from the late fourth century onward. Around that time, royal inscriptions rapidly abandon any references to the older South Arabian pantheon, and new ones begin to invoke the "Lord of Heaven", the "God of Israel", and other monotheistic (and traditionally Jewish) formulae. Scholars differ on whether Himyarite royal religion should be described as Judaism, a Judaism-inspired monotheism or a broader form of South Arabian monotheism.

Christianity was also present in several parts of Arabia, including Najran, the Jafnid/Ghassanid and Nasrid/Lakhmid frontier worlds, Al-Hira (the Lakhmid capital), northwestern Arabia, and the Gulf (particularly in the historical regions of Beth Qatraye and Beth Mazunaye). The conflict between the Jewish-aligned Himyarite ruler Yūsuf Asʾar Yathʾar, known in later Arabic tradition as Dhu Nuwas, and the Christians of Najran became one of the best-known religious crises of late antique Arabia and helped draw the Ethiopian Kingdom of Aksum into South Arabian affairs, ultimately leading to the Aksumite invasion of Himyar and the creation of a Christian state of South Arabia. In the mid-sixth century, the Christian Ethiopian general Abraha dominated Himyar and projected his power into much of the remaining Arabian Peninsula.

In northwestern Arabian inscriptions, older divine names such as Al-Lat, Al-Uzza, Manat, and Dushara appear in earlier material, but later inscriptions abandon them and increasingly invoke Allah (or al-Ilāh) for all religious purposes, including forgiveness and asking for blessings, and later invole only it. Ahmad Al-Jallad and Hythem Sidky interpret that as evidence for a transformation of Arabian religion under the pressure of the late antique monotheistic environment but not as an outright and complete conversion to Christianity.

=== Arabic and writing ===
The late antique period also saw important changes in language and writing. Earlier Arabian inscriptions used several scripts and languages, including Ancient South Arabian, Ancient North Arabian, Nabataean Aramaic, Greek, and Syriac. In northwestern Arabia, Nabataean Aramaic writing gradually developed into Nabataean Arabic and then into the early Arabic script. The developed Arabic script in pre-Islamic times has been termed Paleo-Arabic by modern scholars.

The spread of Arabic writing did not mean the disappearance of other written cultures. Late antique Arabia remained multilingual, especially in South Arabia, where the Sabaic script continues to be used while the northern and Hejazi regions adopted Paleo-Arabic (with the exception of some sites north of Najran, especially Hima, where the Paleo-Arabic script has also been found). The linguistic landscape forms part of the background to the earliest Quranic manuscripts and to the later rise of written Arabic as the dominant script of the Islamic empires, formalized during the reign of Abd al-Malik ibn Marwan.

=== Arab political leadership ===
Arab political leadership expanded in importance during late antiquity. Along the Roman and Sasanian frontiers, Arab leaders mediated between imperial authorities, settled communities, mobile groups, and religious networks. The Jafnids, often called Ghassanids in older scholarship, were allied with the Romans and became important Christian Arab elites in Syria and Arabia. The Nasrids or Lakhmids of Al-Hira played a comparable role on the Sasanian side of the frontier.

While tradition and older scholarship looked at those groups as passive clients of the greate empires of late antiquity, that image has been revised in recent work. Greg Fisher has argued that the authority of Arab leaders such as the Jafnids and Nasrids grew greatly and peaked in the 6th century and that the leaders of the confederations came to wield enormous power and influence in their relations with the Byzantines and Sasanians. For example, the Ghassanid rulers came to be known as "super-phylarchs" and exercised great autonomy in their zones of influence; both Byzantines and Sasanians also became increasingly dependent on them for managing their frontiers with more militarily dynamic Arab tribal and nomadic groups.

South Arabia also projected power into central and western Arabia. By the fifth and early sixth centuries, Himyar interacted with or claimed authority over major groups in Central and Western Arabia such as Kinda, Ma'add, and Mudar. The connections linked Yemen, central Arabia, and the northern frontier worlds, and helped make Arabia a space of competition between the interests of the surrounding kingdoms and empires.

=== Prophetic and monotheist movements ===
The rise of Islam occurred within a wider Arabian environment where prophetic and monotheist movements had become increasingly prevalent. Later Islamic sources remember several Arabian prophet-claimants around the time of Muhammad, including Khalid ibn Sinan, Musaylima, Al-Aswad al-Ansi, Tulayha and Sajah bint al-Harith. While historians approach those sources with caution given their date and fantastical elements, some have also taken the traditions as suggesting that prophetic authority, rhymed revelation, claims to divine communication, and regional political-religious leadership were not exclusively associated with the career of Muhammad. Some historians have raised the rise of figures such as Muhammad and Musaylima to the religious changes and the political crises of the sixth and early seventh centuries. Musaylima, in particular, was a rival military, political, and religious/prophetic figure to Muhammad, based in Al-Yamama.

=== Fall of the Empires ===
Before the Byzantine–Sasanian War of 602–628, the Plague of Justinian had erupted (541–542), spreading through Persia and into Byzantine territory. The Byzantine historian Procopius, who witnessed the plague, documented that citizens died at a rate of 10,000 per day in Constantinople. The exact number; however, is often disputed by contemporary historians. Both empires were permanently weakened by the pandemic as their citizens struggled to deal with death as well as heavy taxation, which increased as each empire campaigned for more territory.

Map of the region from the time of Justinian up to the end of Sasanian rule in 642, outlining Ghassanid and Lakhimid territories

Despite almost succumbing to the plague, Byzantine emperor Justinian I (reigned 527–565) attempted to resurrect the might of the Roman Empire by expanding into Arabia. The Arabian Peninsula had a long coastline for merchant ships and an area of lush vegetation known as the Fertile Crescent, which could help fund his expansion into Europe and North Africa. The drive into Persian territory would also put an end to tribute payments to the Sasanians, which resulted in an agreement to give 11,000 lb (5,000 kg) of tribute to the Persians annually in exchange for a ceasefire.

However, Justinian could not afford further losses in Arabia. The Byzantines and the Sasanians sponsored powerful nomadic mercenaries from the desert with enough power to trump the possibility of aggression in Arabia. Justinian viewed his mercenaries as so valued for preventing conflict that he awarded their chief with the titles of patrician, phylarch and king, the highest honours that he could bestow on anyone. By the late 6th century, an uneasy peace remained until disagreements erupted between the mercenaries and their patron empires.

The Byzantines' allies were a Christian Arabic tribe from the frontiers of the desert that was known as the Ghassanids. The Sasanians' allies, the Lakhmids, were also Christian Arabs but from what is now Iraq. However, denominational disagreements about God forced a schism in the alliances. The Byzantines' official religion was Orthodox Christianity, which believes that Jesus Christ and God are two natures within one entity. The Ghassanids, as Monophysite Christians from Iraq, believed that God and Jesus Christ are only one nature. The disagreement proved irreconcilable and resulted in a permanent break in the alliance.

Meanwhile, the Sasanian Empire broke its alliance with the Lakhmids because of false accusations that the Lakhmids' leader had committed treason. The Sasanians annexed the Lakhmid kingdom in 602. The fertile lands and important trade routes of Iraq were now open ground for upheaval.

=== Early Muslim conquests ===
Expansion of the caliphate, 622–750 CE. Prophet Muhammad, 622–632 Rashidun Caliphate, 632–661 Umayyad Caliphate, 661–750

When the military stalemate was finally broken and it seemed that Byzantium had finally gained the upper hand in battle, nomadic Arabs invaded from the desert frontiers, bringing with them a new social order that emphasized religious devotion over tribal membership.

The political apparatus created by Muhammad (d. 632) was able to conquer Arabia within a few years of his death. Afterwards, this group invaded the Near East into both Sasanian and Byzantine territory. Within a few decades, the Sasanian empire had fallen entirely, with Byzantine territories in the Levant, the Caucasus, Egypt, Syria and North Africa also taken. By the end of the seventh century, an empire stretching from the Pyrenees Mountains in Europe to the Indus River valley in South Asia had been established.

== Sources of information ==
Detailed narrative literature that records or summarizes the historical past is absent from pre-Islamic Arabia. "There is no Arabian Tacitus or Josephus to furnish us with a grand narrative." Information from the time period (contemporary information) could come from the archaeology of the Arabian Peninsula, pre-Islamic Arabian inscriptions, and literary accounts from observers outside of the peninsula (including Assyrians, Babylonians, Israelites, Greeks, Romans, and Persians). Texts specifically related to Arabia in the pre-Islamic period include the Periplus of the Erythraean Sea, parts of the 16th book of Strabo's Geography, the Book of the Himyarites, Jacob of Serugh's Letter to the Himyarites, the Letter of the Archimandrites of Arabia, the Martyrdom of Arethas, and the Martyrdom of Azqir. Furthermore, many writings survive from Syriac Christian authors originating in the Beth Qatraye of eastern Arabia, such as Ahob of Qatar and Isaac of Qatar, but those writings come from after they had moved to the Near East.

At the turn of the Islamic era, the Quran and the Constitution of Medina can act as helpful literary sources for learning about pre-Islamic Arabia. During the Islamic era, many scholars collected or wrote about pre-Islamic times. For example, many efforts were made beginning in the eighth century to compile pre-Islamic Arabic poetry, some of which is considered authentic by historians. One narrative genre, the Days of the Arabs, were attempts in later periods to document the notable moments of warfare in pre-Islamic Arabia. Another literary genre focused on the genealogies of peoples, tribes, and kingdoms in pre-Islamic Arabia. A number of Muslim scholars wrote what would become, in Islamic memory, major sources for understanding the pre-Islamic Arabian past, although they are permeated by large amounts of legendary material. Some of them include the Book of Idols by Ibn al-Kalbi, History of the Prophets and Kings by Al-Tabari, Crowns by al-Hamdani, The Book of Crowns on the Kings of Himyar by Ibn Hisham, the History of al-Ya'qubi by Al-Ya'qubi, the Life of the Prophet by Ibn Ishaq, the Kitab al-Ma'arif of Ibn Qutaybah, and the Book of the Conquests of Egypt of ʿAbd al-Ḥakam. A few Persian sources for pre-Islamic Arabia, which were also written down during the Islamic period, also exist, like the Bundahišn, the Shahnameh by Ferdowsi, and the Šahrestānīhā ī Ērānšahr.

Systematic archaeology in the region is ongoing, but recent. For that reason, no firm chronology has yet been established for Arabian material culture. Numismatics, the study of coins, has also helped learn about legend, iconography, and the history of rulership. Of any one region, the archaeology of Eastern Arabia is the most advanced so far, which is also the region with the earliest documented literary history from Mesopotamian sources as far back as 2500 BCE. Documentation of North and South Arabia begins around 900 BCE.

No one source of information is perfect: sources can be late, incomplete, or biased.

== See also ==
- Ancient Near East
- Arab (etymology)
- Arabian mythology
- History of Saudi Arabia
- History of Bahrain
- History of the Arabic alphabet
- History of the United Arab Emirates
- Incense Route
- List of wars and battles in pre-Islamic Arabia
- Pre-Islamic Arab trade
- Pre-Islamic calendar
- Rahmanism
- Soviet Orientalist studies in Islam
- Women in pre-Islamic Arabia

== Bibliography ==
- Al-Jallad, Ahmad (2020). "The Linguistic Landscape of pre-Islamic Arabia: Context for the Qur'an". In Shah, Mustafa; Haleem, M.A.S. Abdel (eds.). The Oxford Handbook of Qur'anic Studies. Oxford University Press. pp. 111–127.
- Al-Jallad, Ahmad (2022). The Religion and Rituals of the Nomads of Pre-Islamic Arabia: A Reconstruction Based on the Safaitic Inscriptions. Brill.
- Al-Jallad, Ahmad; Sidky, Hythem (2026). "Late Antique Allāh: Ancestral Arabian Religion and the Monotheistic Zeitgeist". Arabian Archaeology and Epigraphy: 1–10. doi:10.1111/aae.70019.
- Al-Said, Said F. (2010). "Dedan (Al-Ula)". In Al-Ghabban, Ali Ibrahim; Andre-Salvini, Beatrice; Demange, Francoise; Juvin, Carine; Cotty, Marianne (eds.). Roads of Arabia: Archaeology and History of the Kingdom of Saudi Arabia. Somogy Art Publishing. pp. 263–269.
- Avanzini, Alessandra (2016). By land and by sea: a history of South Arabia before Islam recounted from inscriptions. L'Erma Di Bretschneider.
- Borrut, Antoine (2025). "An Islamic Late Antiquity? Problems and Perspectives". Journal of Late Antique, Islamic and Byzantine Studies. 4 (1): 1–27. doi:10.3366/jlaibs.2024.0036.
- Bowersock, G. W. (2013). The Throne of Adulis: Red Sea Wars on the Eve of Islam. Oxford University Press.
- Bowersock, G. W. (2017). The Crucible of Islam. Harvard University Press.
- Cole, Juan (2020). "Muhammad and Justinian: Roman Legal Traditions and the Qurʾān". Journal of Near Eastern Studies. 79 (2): 183–196. doi:10.1086/710188.
- Daum, Werner (2024). "Ancient South Arabian Legal Texts with Semitic Parallels and Their Anthropological Background". Journal of the American Oriental Society. 144 (3): 671–675. doi:10.7817/jaos.144.3.2024.ra005.
- Debie, Muriel (2024). "The Arabs and Northern Languages and Scripts before Islam". In Vacca, Alison; Borrut, Antoine; Ceballos, Manuela (eds.). Navigating Language in the Early Islamic World: Multilingualism and Language Change in the First Centuries of Islam. Brepols. pp. 195–257.
- Dugast, Fabienne; Gajda, Iwona (2017). "Contacts between Ethiopia and South Arabia in the first millenium AD: an overview" (PDF). In Arbach, Mounir; Jérémie, Schiettecatte (eds.). Pre-Islamic South Arabia and its Neighbours: New Developments of Research. Archaeopress. pp. 79–94.
- Fiema, Zbigniew (2025). "Freedmen in Roman Hegra". In Repper, Rebecca; Bewley, Robert; Bishop, Mike (eds.). Reframing the "Desert Frontier": Studies in the Ancient Near East and Northern Arabia in Honour of David Kennedy. Sydney University Press. pp. 27–62.
- Firestone, Reuven (2006), "Thamūd", in McAuliffe, Jane Dammen (ed.), Encyclopaedia of the Qurʼān, Volume Five, Brill, pp. 252–254, ISBN 978-9004123564.
- Fisher, Greg (2011). Between Empires: Arabs, Romans, and Sasanians in Late Antiquity. Oxford University Press.
- Fisher, Greg (2019). Rome, Persia, and Arabia: Shaping the Middle East from Pompey to Muhammad. Routledge.
- Fisher, Greg (2021). The Roman World from Romulus to Muhammad: A New History. Routledge.
- Grasso, Valentina A. (2023). Pre-Islamic Arabia: Societies, Politics, Cults and Identities during Late Antiquity. Cambridge University Press. doi:10.1017/9781009252997.
- Grasso, Valentina; Davitashvili, Ana; Abuhussein, Nadja (2023). "Introduction. Epigraphy, the Qurʾān, and the Religious Landscape of Arabia". Millennium. 20 (1): 1–14. doi:10.1515/mill-2023-0002.
- Hausleiter, Arnulf (2010). "The Oasis of Tayma". In Al-Ghabban, Ali Ibrahim; Andre-Salvini, Beatrice; Demange, Francoise; Juvin, Carine; Cotty, Marianne (eds.). Roads of Arabia: Archaeology and History of the Kingdom of Saudi Arabia. Somogy Art Publishing. pp. 219–261.
- Hoyland, Robert G. (2002), Arabia and the Arabs: From the Bronze Age to the Coming of Islam, Routledge, ISBN 978-1-134-64634-0
- Kaizer, Ted (2008), The Variety of Local Religious Life in the Near East: In the Hellenistic and Roman Periods, Brill, ISBN 978-90-04-16735-3
- Klasova, Pamela (2023). "Arabic Poetry in Late Antiquity: The Rāʾiyya of Imruʾ al-Qays". In Fakhreddine, Huda; Stetkevych, Suzanne Pinckney (eds.). The Routledge Handbook of Arabic Poetry. Routledge. pp. 1–26. doi:10.4324/9781003096955-1.
- Kozah, Mario; Abu-Husayn, Abdulrahim (2014), The Syriac Writers of Qatar in the Seventh Century, Gorgias Press, LLC, ISBN 978-1-4632-0355-9
- Landau-Tasseron, Ella (1995). "Ḏū Qār". In Yarshater, Ehsan (ed.). Encyclopædia Iranica. Vol. VII/6: Drugs–Ebn al-Aṯir. London and New York: Routledge & Kegan Paul. pp. 574–575. ISBN 978-1-56859-024-0.
- Lindstedt, Ilkka (2023). Muhammad and His Followers in Context: The Religious Map of Late Antique Arabia. Brill.
- MacDonald, Michael C.A. (2015). "On the Uses of Writing in Ancient Arabia and the Role of Palaeography in Studying Them". Arabian Epigraphic Notes. 1: 1–50.
- MacDonald, Michael (2015b). "Arabs and Empires before the Sixth Century". In Fisher, Greg (ed.). Arabs and Empires before Islam. Oxford University Press. pp. 11–89.
- Mackintosh-Smith, Tim (2019). Arabs: A 3,000-Year History of Peoples, Tribes and Empires. Yale University Press. ISBN 978-0-300-18028-2.
- Magee, Peter (2014). The Archaeology of Prehistoric Arabia: Adaptation and Social Formation from the Neolithic to the Iron Age. Cambridge University Press.
- Mahoney, Daniel (2021). "The Formation of South Arabian Identity in al-Iklīl of al-Hamdānī". In Pohl, Walter; Mahoney, Daniel (eds.). Historiography and Identity IV: Writing History across Medieval Eurasia. Brepols. pp. 137–156.
- Maraqten, Mohammed (2021). "Historiography of Pre-Islamic Arabia: Arab Scholars and Their Contributions to the Writing of the History of Ancient Yemen". In Baadj, Amar (ed.). A Handbook of Modern Arabic Historical Scholarship on the Ancient and Medieval Periods. Brill. pp. 100–137.
- Millar, Fergus (2009). "Christian Monasticism in Roman Arabia at the Birth of Mahomet". Semitica et Classica. 2: 97–115. doi:10.1484/J.SEC.1.100512.
- Miller, Nathaniel (2024). The Emergence of Arabic Poetry: From Regional Identities to Islamic Canonization. University of Pennsylvania Press. ISBN 978-1-5128-2531-2.
- Munt, Harry (2014). The Holy City of Medina: Sacred Space in Early Islamic Arabia. Cambridge University Press.
- Munt, Harry (2015). "Arabic and Persian Sources for Pre-Islamic Arabia". In Fisher, Greg (ed.). Arabs and Empires before Islam. Oxford University Press. pp. 437–500.
- Munt, Harry (2015b). ""No two religions": Non-Muslims in the early Islamic Ḥijāz". Bulletin of the School of Oriental and African Studies. 78 (2): 253–254. doi:10.1017/S0041977X14001049. ISSN 0041-977X.
- Nebes, Norbert (2023). "Early Saba and its Neighbors". In Radner, Karen; Moeller, Nadine; Potts, Daniel (eds.). The Oxford History of the Ancient Near East: Volume V: the Age of Persia. Oxford University Press. pp. 299–375. ISBN 978-0-19-068766-3.
- Nehmé, Laïla (2021). "The religious landscape of North-west Arabia as reflected in the Nabataean, Nabataeo-Arabic, and pre-Islamic Arabic inscriptions". Semitica et Classica. 13: 127–154.
- Petraglia, Michael; Rose, Jeffrey, eds. (2009). The Evolution of Human Populations in Arabia: Paleoenvironments, Prehistory and Genetics. Springer.
- Robin, Christian Julien (2002). "Saba' and the Sabaeans". In Simpson, John (ed.). Queen of Sheba, Treasures from Ancient Yemen. The British Museum Press. pp. 51–58.
- Robin, Christian J. (2014). "The peoples beyond the Arabian frontier in late antiquity: recent epigraphic discoveries and latest advances" (PDF). Inside and Out. Interactions between Rome and the Peoples on the Arabian and Egyptian Frontiers in Late Antiquity. Peeters. pp. 33–79.
- Robin, Christian J. (2015). "Ghassān en Arabie". In Genequand, Denis; Robin, Christian J. (eds.). Les Jafnides, rois arabes au service de Byzance (VIe siècle de l'ère chrétienne). De Boccard. pp. 79–120.
- Robin, Christian Julien (2015b). "Ḥimyar, Aksūm, and Arabia Deserta in Late Antiquity: The Epigraphic Evidence". In Fisher, Greg (ed.). Arabs and empires before Islam. Oxford, United Kingdom: Oxford University Press. pp. 127–171. ISBN 978-0-19-965452-9.
- Rohmer, Jérôme; Charloux, Guillaume (2015). "From Liḥyān to the Nabataeans: Dating the End of the Iron Age in Northwestern Arabia". Proceedings of the Seminar for Arabian Studies. 45: 297–320.
- Schulz, Regine (2024). "South Arabia and Its Relations with Ethiopia: A Reciprocal History". In Sciacca, Christine (ed.). Ethiopia at the Crossroads. Yale University Press. pp. 127–133. ISBN 978-0-300-27279-6.
- Shahid, Irfan (1995). Byzantium and the Arabs in the Sixth Century, Volume 1, Part 2: Ecclesiastical History. Dumbarton Oaks.
- Shoshan, Boaz (2021). "The Sasanian Conquest of Ḥimyar Reconsidered: In Search of a Local Hero". In Mortensen, Mette Bjerregaard; Dye, Guillaume; Oliver, Isaac W.; Tesei, Tommaso (eds.). The Study of Islamic Origins: New Perspectives and Contexts. De Gruyter. pp. 259–274. doi:10.1515/9783110675498-011. ISBN 978-3-11-067549-8.
- Stein, Peter (2009). "Literacy In Pre-Islamic Arabia: An Analysis of The Epigraphic Evidence". In Marx, Michael; Neuwirth, Angelika; Sinai, Nicolai (eds.). The Qurʾān in Context: Historical and Literary Investigations into the Qurʾānic Milieu. Texts and Studies on the Qurʾān. Vol. 6. Leiden and Boston: Brill Publishers. pp. 255–280. doi:10.1163/ej.9789004176881.i-864.58. ISBN 978-90-04-17688-1. ISSN 1567-2808. S2CID 68889318.
- Stein, Peter (2024). "South Arabian documentation on wooden sticks: A résumé fifty years after discovery". Proceedings of the Seminar for Arabian Studies. 53: 278–291.
- Sykes, Egerton (2014), Who's Who in Non-Classical Mythology, Routledge, ISBN 978-1-136-41437-4
- Toral-Niehoff, Isabel (2013). "Late Antique Iran and the Arabs: The Case of al-Hira*". Journal of Persianate Studies. 6 (1–2). Brill: 115–126. doi:10.1163/18747167-12341252.
- Van Bladel, Kevin (2018). "Languages of Arabia". In McGill, Scott; Watts, Edward (eds.). A Companion to Late Antique Literature. Wiley-Blackwell. pp. 123–140.
- Van Putten, Marijn (2023). "The Development of the Hijazi Orthography". Millennium. 20 (1): 107–128. doi:10.1515/mill-2023-0007. hdl:1887/3715910.
- Villeneuve, François (2004). "Une inscription latine sur l'archipel Farasân, Arabie Séoudite, sud de la mer Rouge". Année. 148 (1): 419–429.
- Waardenburg, Jean Jacques (2003), "The Earliest Relations of Islam with Other Religions: The Meccan Polytheists", Muslims and Others: Relations in Context, Religion and Reason, vol. 41, Berlin: De Gruyter, pp. 89–91, doi:10.1515/9783110200959, ISBN 978-3-11-017627-8
- Webb, Peter (2016). Imagining the Arabs: Arab Identity and the Rise of Islam. Edinburgh University Press.
- Webb, Peter (2020). "Ethnicity, Power and Umayyad Society: The Rise and Fall of the People of Ma'add". In Marsham, Andrew (ed.). The Umayyad World. Routledge. pp. 65–102.
- Wilkinson, Tony (2009). "Environment and Long-Term Population Trends in Southwest Arabia". In Rose, Jeffrey; Petraglia, Michael (eds.). The Evolution of Human Populations in Arabia: Paleoenvironments, Prehistory and Genetics. Springer Netherlands. pp. 51–66. ISBN 978-90-481-2719-1.
