= Christianity in Eastern Arabia =

Christians reached the shores of the Persian Gulf by the beginning of the fourth century. According to the Chronicle of Seert, Bishop David of Perat d'Maishan was present at the Council of Seleucia-Ctesiphon, around 325, and sailed as far as India. Gregory Bar Hebraeus, Chron. Eccles, 2.10 (v. 3, col. 28) indicates that David had earlier ordained one of the other bishops present at the Council. The monk Jonah is said to have established a monastery in the Persian Gulf "on the shores of the black island" in the middle of the fourth century. A Church of the East bishopric was established at Reishahr, nearly opposite Kharg Island in the northern Persian Gulf, before the Council of Dadisho in AD 424.

Eastern Arabia was divided into two main ecclesiastical regions: Beth Qatraye (northeastern Arabia) and Beth Mazunaye (southeastern Arabia). Christianity in Eastern Arabia was blunted by the arrival of Islam by 628. Despite this, the practice of Christianity persisted in the region until the late ninth century.

From the fifth century onward, the Persian Gulf fell under the jurisdiction of the Church of the East. Christian sites have been discovered dating from that time until after the advent of Islam in the region at Failaka Island, Kharg Island, Jubail, and the nearby settlements of Thaj, al-Hinnah and Jabal Berri, and Sir Bani Yas. While archaeological evidence dominates the coverage of what is known about the monastic scene of Eastern Arabia, one hagiography, the History of Mar Yawnan, is set in the Persian Gulf and Eastern Arabia region.

== History ==
After the region fell under the reign of the Sasanian Empire in the early third century, many of the inhabitants in Eastern Arabia were introduced to Eastern Christianity following the eastward dispersal of the religion by Mesopotamian Christians. However, it was not until the fourth century that Christianity gained popularity in the region. This was, in large part, due to the arrival of Christians who faced persecution in Iraq and Iran under the reign of Shapur II starting in 339. Another factor in the growing influence of Christianity was the migration of Christian traders to the region who were looking to capitalize on the well-established pearl trade.

A sizable Christian presence in Eastern Arabia soon emerged thereafter. The monk Jonah alludes to the presence of a monastery on the Black Islands, in the southern portion of Beth Qatraye, built between 343 and 346 by a monk named Mar Zadoe. Furthermore, the Chronicle of Seert mentions a monk named 'Abdisho who Christianized the locals of Ramath, an island located between Kuwait and Qatar, and built a monastery there sometime between 363 and 371. Church of the East records attest to a consistent Christian presence in the region between the fifth and seventh centuries, as evidenced by the regular attendance of synods by local bishops.

The Christian population consisted mainly of Syriac and Middle Persian speakers, while the remainder consisted primarily of Arabic-speakers deriving from the Abd al-Qays tribe. Communities often competed over the construction of churches and parishes. In addition to facilitating the celebration of festive occasions, monasteries were also famous for their vineyards and were often visited for wine tasting. Churches also typically provided basic services such as schooling and healthcare.

According to Muslim tradition, Muhammad sent a Muslim envoy named Al-Ala'a Al-Hadrami to Munzir ibn Sawa Al-Tamimi, a ruler in Eastern Arabia, in 628, requesting that he and his people accept Islam. Most of the Pagan practitioners converted to Islam shortly thereafter. However, the monotheistic population, who consisted of Jews and Zoroastrians in addition to Christians, did not instantaneously convert. Instead, many chose to pay the jizya, a tax for non-Muslims.

Christianity abated in the region sometime around the ninth century.

== Historical regions ==
=== Beth Qatraye ===
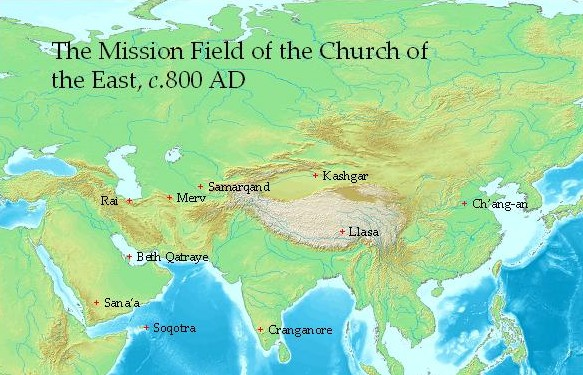
The mission field of the Church of the East, indicating Beth Qatraye, c. 800

The Christian name used for the region encompassing northeastern Arabia was Beth Qatraye, sometimes also called "the Isles". The name translates to "region of the Qataris" in Syriac. It included the present-day areas of Bahrain, Tarout Island, al-Khatt, Al-Hasa, and Qatar. Some parts of the United Arab Emirates may also have been included. The region contained monasteries from the fourth to ninth centuries. From the sixth to seventh centuries, bishops were known to be stationed in the districts of Mashmahig (Samaheej), Dayrin (Tarout Island), Mazun, Hagar, and Ḥaṭṭa. The bishops of Beth Qatraye stopped attending synods in 676 although Christianity persisted in the region until the late ninth century.

By the fifth century, Beth Qatraye was a major centre for the Church of the East, which had come to dominate the southern shores of the Persian Gulf. As a sect, Eastern Christians were often persecuted as heretics by the Byzantine Empire, but eastern Arabia was outside the Empire's control, offering some safety.

The dioceses of Beth Qatraye did not form an ecclesiastical province, except for a short period during the mid-to-late seventh century. They were instead subject to the Metropolitan of Fars. In the late seventh century, Beth Qatraye rebelled against the authority of Fars. In an effort to reconcile the bishops of Qatraye, Giwargis I held a synod at Dayrin (Tarout Island) in 676.

In the seventh and eighth centuries, an important literary culture emerged in Beth Qatraye. Several notable Nestorian writers originating from Beth Qatraye are ascribed to this period, including Isaac of Nineveh, Dadisho Qatraya, Gabriel of Qatar, Gabriel Arya and Ahob of Qatar. A number of archaeological sites are also dated to this time-frame.

There is some ambiguity about the language used in Beth Qatraye, Qatrayith. Written text contained both Persian and Semitic words. While some of the latter are Arabic, the general morphology and phonetics bear more resemblance to Aramaic. German orientalist Anton Schall categorized the language "Southeastern Aramaic". Because of this unique fusion of linguistic elements, the monks of Beth Qatraye were active in translating texts between Persian, Syriac and Arabic. It is said that a Christian from Beth Qatraye even served as the official Persian translator for King al-Nu'man III ibn al-Mundhir who was a native Arabic speaker.

=== Beth Mazunaye ===
Oman and the United Arab Emirates composed the diocese known as Beth Mazunaye. The name was derived from 'Mazun', the Persian name for Oman and the United Arab Emirates. Sohar was the central city of the diocese.

== Archaeology ==
=== Akkaz ===
In 1993 a joint Kuwaiti-French expedition found a church in Akkaz (in present Kuwait) dating to the early Abbasid era. The church was in the eastern church style and is symmetrical to that of Failaka.

=== Failaka ===
Remnants of a church, dating to perhaps as early as the 5th or 6th century as determined by the crosses that form part of the stucco decoration, were found at Al-Qusur on the Kuwaiti island of Failaka. Pottery at the site can be dated from as early as the first half of the 7th century through the 9th century.

=== Kharg ===
Several tombs have been found decorated with distinctive Nestorian crosses on Kharg Island. A monastery with a church and nearby homes for married priests have also been excavated. The floral designs in the plaster decoration of the church suggested to the excavator a date in the fifth or sixth centuries AD. Later studies would seem to date the decorations to the end of the sixth century AD.

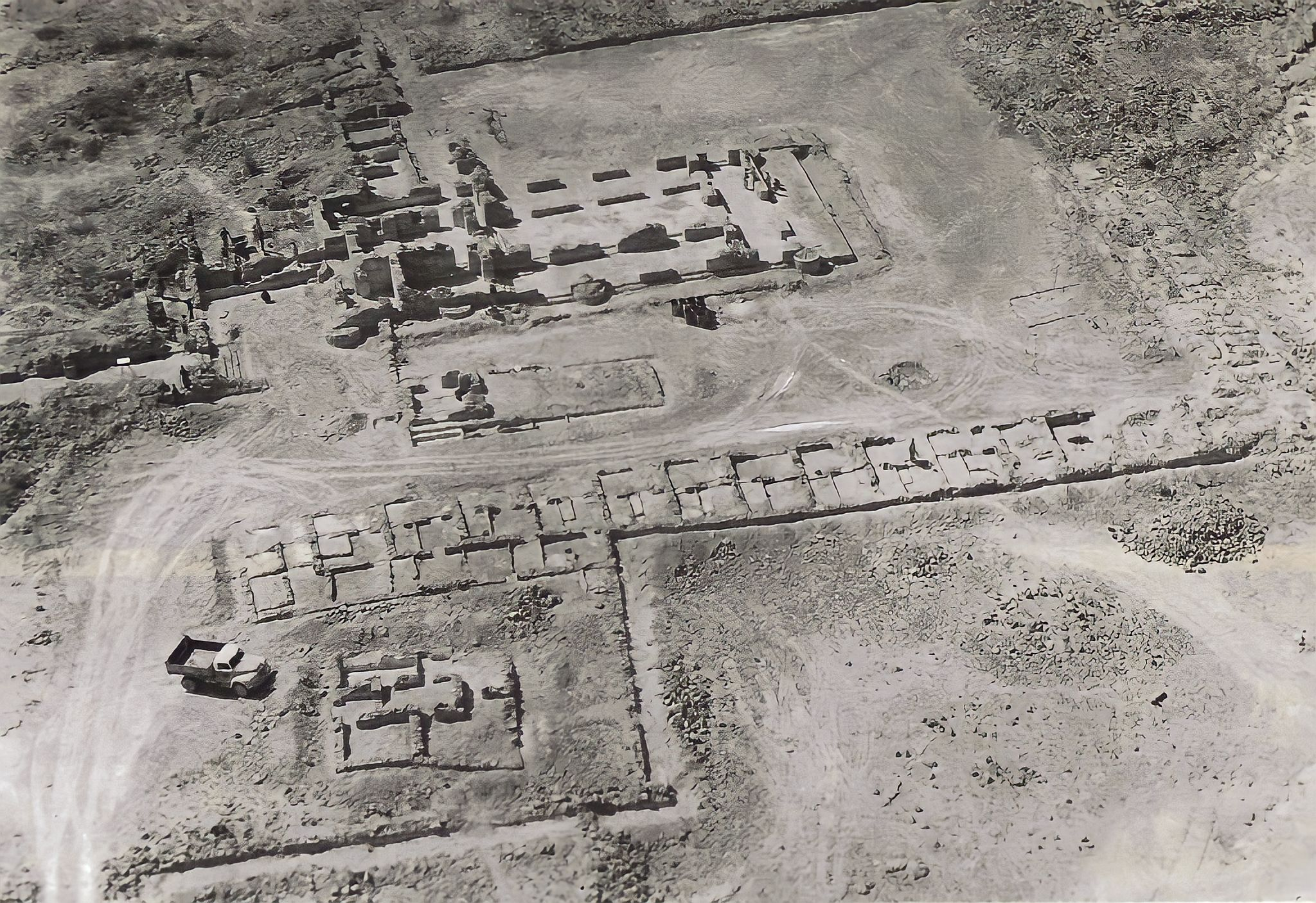
Remains of the Assyrian Church of the East monastery (fa) in Kharg Island.

=== Jubail and nearby areas ===
A church consisting of a walled courtyard and three rooms on the east side was found in 1986 in Jubail. Cross designs were seen to have been impressed into the plaster flanking the doors of the structure. The reporter of the site did not indicate a clear date for it, but suggested that it must have been in existence for two centuries before the advent of Islam. Christian gravestones were also found at the site. At Thaj, 90 km to the west, what appears to be a smaller church or chapel, built of reused stones and perhaps dating to the fifth or sixth century, has been discovered. 10 km NE of Thaj, at al-Hinnah, there is evidence of a Christian cemetery of ancient but unknown date. A church was identified in the island of Abu 'Ali near Jubail.

=== Jabal Berri ===
Not far to the South of Jubail, at Jabal Berri, three bronze crosses have been found dating possibly to the period when Sassanian Persia had influence over the region. Ruins of a nearby settlement suggests that a Christian community may have resided in the area.

=== Muharraq ===
Old foundations of a Nestorian monastery were discovered in Samaheej, a village in Muharraq, Bahrain. Another village in Muharraq, known as Al Dair, may have facilitated a monastery, as its name translates 'cloister' or 'monastery' in Aramaic.

=== Qasr Al Malehat ===
A site on the south-east coast of Qatar, near Al Wakrah, revealed the remnants of a structure purported to be a church. It was built directly on limestone bedrock and a hearth was found inside the ruins. Radiocarbon dating indicates the site was occupied in the early 7th century, and potsherds recovered from the surrounding area evidences continued occupation until the mid to late 8th century. The ceramics are consistent with those found in other Nestorian sites in the Eastern Arabia and the structure bears resemblance to the excavated church in Jubail.

=== Umm Al Maradim ===
An excavation carried out in 2013 uncovered a Nestorian cross in Umm Al Maradim, a site in central Qatar. The cross is made of hard stone and measures between 3 and 4 cm. A number of hearths and potsherds were found at the site, though no structures were discovered.

=== Umm Al Quwain ===
In 2022, archeologists announced the find of a monastery in Siniyah Island, off of the coast of Umm Al Quwain in the United Arab Emirates. The ruins include a monastery for prayers, a kitchen, store rooms, and living quarters for a bishop or abbot. There is a large cistern, possibly used for baptisms, and a chalices were found onside, which may have been used for communion.

=== Sir Bani Yas ===
At Sir Bani Yas, an island off the Western coast of the United Arab Emirates, an extensive monastic and ecclesiastical complex has been found similar to that at Kharg. It is considered one of the most extensive monasteries in Eastern Arabia. Excavations took place between 1993 and 1996. The Sir Bani Yas church building itself was about 14 m × 4.5 m. As with other sites in the region, plaster crosses were excavated. The excavator suggests a date in the sixth or seventh century for the construction of the church.

== See also ==
- Christianity in Kuwait
- Christianity in Bahrain
- Christianity in Qatar
- Christianity in the United Arab Emirates

== Sources ==
- Calvet, Yves (1998). "Monuments paléochrétiens à Koweit et dans la région du Golfe". Orientalia Christiana Analecta. 256: 671–699.
