= Beth Qatraye =

Historical region in Eastern Arabia

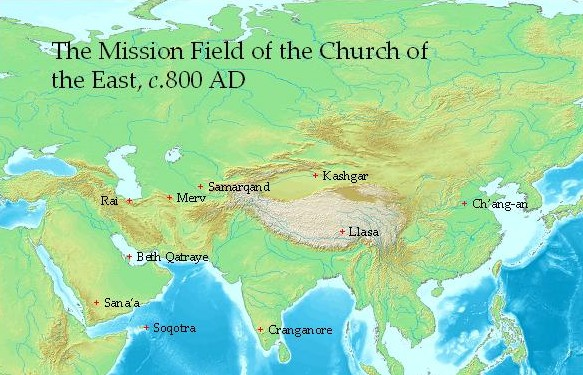
The mission field of the Church of the East, indicating Beth Qatraye, c. 800

Beth Qatraye was a historical region in northeastern Arabia and the Persian Gulf, and was a major site for the history of Christianity in Eastern Arabia and pre-Islamic Arabian Christianity, in the sphere of influence of Sasanian Arabia.

Its name means "region of the Qataris" in Syriac, and Syriac sources also refer to its communities as "the islands" (gazrāthā). In late antiquity and the early Islamic period, it formed an important area of the Church of the East, whose communities occupied towns, coastal districts, and islands along the southern Persian Gulf.

Beth Qatraye was the home of a large population of Syriac Christians, who used a local vernacular language called Qatrayith (literally "in Qatari"), although they wrote in Syriac. Most of the evidence is from the seventh century, when Beth Qatraye became a literary center for Eastern Christianity and produced several Christian authors. Among them are Isaac of Qatar, Dadisho Qatraya, Gabriel of Qatar, Gabriel Arya and Ahob of Qatar.

== Geography and history ==
The exact geography of Beth Qatraye is uncertain. Syriac evidence places it in northeastern Arabia and the Gulf, and Kozah argues that it included the Qatar Peninsula, the hinterland of Yamama, the northeastern Arabian coast as far as Musandam in present-day Oman, and the adjacent islands. It has also been described as including areas corresponding to modern Qatar, Bahrain, the United Arab Emirates, Tarout Island, al-Khatt, and Al-Hasa.

Syriac sources name a number of places within Beth Qatraye, including the islands of Dayrin, Ruha, Arday, Tuduru, Talun, and Mashmahig, as well as the inland localities of Hatta and Hagar. The identification of several of these places remains disputed. Some names can be connected with known Gulf islands or coastal towns; others are known only from Syriac ecclesiastical lists and remain tentative until further archaeological survey is conducted.

=== Islands ===
==== Dayrin ====
Dayrin was one of the named islands of Beth Qatraye and is mentioned in both the Synodicon Orientale and the letters of Ishoyahb III. It is usually identified with Tarout Island off the coast of al-Qatif, where the settlement of Darin preserves a similar name. Kozah nevertheless cautions that the identification is not certain: Tuduru may instead represent Tarout, while Dayrin could have been another island of historical Bahrain. In ecclesiastical terms, Dayrin was an episcopal seat and became the site of the synod held by Giwargis I in 676. Ishoyahb, the only bishop of Dayrin named in the Synodicon Orientale, attended the gathering.

Later Arabic geographers describe Darin as the principal harbor and commercial center of Tarout Island. Ships brought perfume and other goods from India, while its markets handled dates, pearls, textiles, spices, weapons, and swords for redistribution around the Gulf and beyond. These reports chiefly concern the early Islamic centuries, but Kozah argues that Dayrin's status as an episcopal seat by 676 may point to an earlier phase of its importance.

==== Mashmahig ====
Mashmahig was both an island and a metropolitan town within Beth Qatraye. It is commonly associated with Samaheej on Muharraq Island in modern Bahrain. The later geographer Yaqut al-Hamawi described Samaheej as an island in the sea between Oman and al-Bahrain, and also reported that it was a town near Dayrin and Jawatha. Kozah reads this as corresponding to the Syriac evidence that Mashmahig functioned as both an island settlement and an ecclesiastical center.

==== Daray, Ruha and Talun ====
The Synodicon Orientale places the islands of Talun and Ruha near Daray. Kozah suggests that these three names may refer to a cluster of islands off the western coast of Qatar, possibly among the Hawar Islands near Zekreet. Daray was an episcopal see, while Ruha and Talun do not appear to have been dioceses. Kozah treats these identifications as provisional, since archaeological work has not yet confirmed the proposed locations.

==== Arday and Tuduru ====
Arday and Tuduru appear together in the Synodicon Orientale as a single diocese under one metropolitan bishop, which suggests that the two islands were geographically close to one another. Kozah proposes that they may have been twin islands near the possible Daray-Ruha-Talun cluster off the Qatari peninsula, but emphasizes that this remains speculative pending archaeological survey.

==== Qish ====
Qish appears in the Synodicon Orientale in connection with an episcopal assembly held in 544 under the catholicos Aba I. Bishop David of Qish left the assembly to return to "his country", while the other clergy travelled north toward Beth Huzaye, suggesting to Kozah that Qish may have lain south of Fars, possibly on Kish Island in the Gulf. The identification remains uncertain, but Kozah argues that the Syriac form Qish is closer to the Arabic name Qays than to the Persian form Kish. Later Arabic geographers describe Qays/Qish as a major Gulf island between Oman and Fars, known for agriculture, pearls, shipping, shipbuilding, and commerce between Persia and India. These later accounts describe the island as a market for Arabs and non-Arabs, a pearl-fishing center, and a place where goods from India and the wider Indian Ocean circulated.

==== Ramath and Failaka ====
The Chronicle of Seert mentions an island in the region of al-Yamama and al-Bahrain, corresponding geographically to Beth Qatraye, where Abdisho of Arphelouna baptized the inhabitants and built a monastery. The chronicle states that the island was called Ramath in the author's own time and places it eighteen parasangs from Ubulla. Daniel Potts had placed Ramath near Abu Ali Island, north of al-Jubayl, but Kozah argues that the distance given in the Chronicle of Seert better fits Failaka Island, off modern Kuwait. This identification is strengthened by the discovery of a seventh- or eighth-century church and monastic complex at al-Qusur on Failaka.

==== The Black Island and Kharg ====
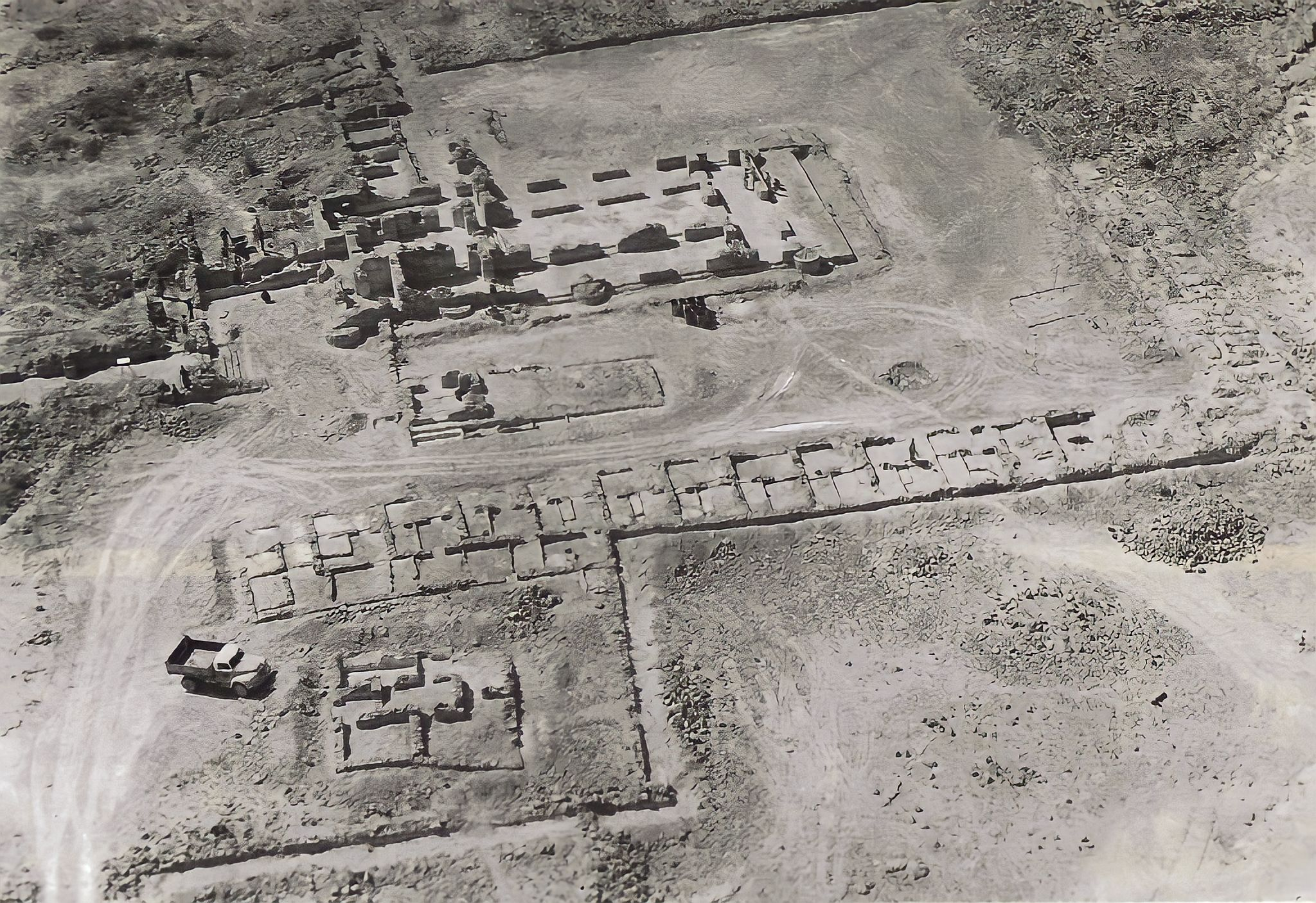
Remains of the Assyrian Church of the East monastery on Kharg Island

The History of Mar Yawnan refers to the Monastery of Rabban Thomas on the slopes of the "Black Island", located at the far end of Beth Qatraye. Several identifications have been proposed. Alphonse Mingana associated it with Ibn Kawan or Lafit; Geoffrey King and Richard Payne connected it with Sir Bani Yas, where a Church of the East monastic complex has been excavated; Kozah also discusses al-Hazim, described by al-Bakri as a black mountain in the sea near Bahrain and associated with pearl divers. Kozah ultimately gives particular attention to Kharg Island, which had a large Christian monastic site, agricultural installations, pearl fisheries, and a strategic position on maritime routes between Basra, Oman, the Indian Ocean, East Asia, and East Africa. On this reconstruction, the "Black Island" may reflect Kharg's monastic and pearling landscape, though the identification remains tentative.

== Christianity in Beth Qatraye ==
Christianity was introduced into Beth Qatraye by the fourth century, and a scholastic Christian literary culture may have developed in the region by the sixth century. Most of the evidence for this culture is from the seventh century, when literary works have survived from many authors:

...including Gabriel the Interpreter of Mahoze, Gabriel bar Lipah Qatraya, Gabriel Qatraya (ca. first half of the 7th century), Abraham bar Lipah (7th century), (another) Gabriel Qatraya (ca. 7th century), Isaac of Nineveh (late 7th century), Dadisho Qatraya (late 7th century), and possibly Isho'panah Qatraya (unknown date) and Jacob Qatraya (unknown date)—who were either from or connected to Beth Qatraye, produced a wide range of writings, from biblical commentaries to liturgical and monastic works. Perhaps the most extensive evidence for seventh-century.

Important evidence for the religious organization and affairs of the Christians of Beth Qatraye come from the letters of Ishoyahb III, the Patriarch of the Church of the East from 649 to 659. Of the 106 letters of Ishoyahb that survive, 5 were sent to three different groups of Beth Qatraye: one to the bishops (letter 17), two to the people of Beth Qatraye (letters 18–19), and two to the monks (letters 20–21).

Christianity in Beth Qatraye is not directly documented in the eighth century, but available sources suggest that Christian communities continued to exist there during the ninth century. This survival is reflected in several references from the period, including correspondence sent by Ishoʿ bar Nun (d. 828) to Isaac, an ecclesiastical official responsible for Beth Qatraye, reports of Christians participating in the pearl-diving industry around Bahrain in the 830s, and accounts describing the relatively favorable treatment of Christians in Yamama and Bahrain under the rule of Abu Sa'id al-Jannabi during the tenure of Catholicos Yohannan III (893–899). Following the ninth century, however, the historical record no longer provides reliable evidence for a Christian presence in Beth Qatraye, a decline generally attributed to the region’s growing Islamization.

=== Ecclesiastical history ===
The first documented involvement of a Christian religious official participating in an international synod was in the fifth century. In 410 AD, a bishop of the Mashmahig island named Eliya was present at the Church of the East synod held at Seleucia-Ctesiphon, while another bishop of Mashmahig was deposed and excommunicated at the same synod. From the sixth century onward, the province included bishops in Mashmahig, Dayrin, Hagar, and Hatta, and other sources also associate the region with bishops or dioceses in Qish, Arday and Tuduru, Daray, and Mazun.

The dioceses of Beth Qatraye did not form an ecclesiastical province, except for a short period during the mid-to-late seventh century. They were usually subject to the metropolitan of Fars, whose see was at Rev Ardashir. During the patriarchate of Ishoyahb III, the bishops of Beth Qatraye joined the metropolitan of Fars in rejecting the authority of the catholicosate at Seleucia-Ctesiphon. The dispute was resolved by 676, when Giwargis I visited the region and convened a synod at Dayrin. The bishops of Beth Qatraye stopped attending synods after 676, although Christianity persisted in the region until the late ninth century.

==== Synod of Dayrin (676) ====
In May 676, Giwargis I reached Dayrin after travelling by sea through the islands and other settlements of Beth Qatraye. The synod's dating formula, "the fifty-seventh year of the rule of the Arabs", is an early Christian use of the Hijri calendar without an accompanying date in the traditional Seleucid era. Those present included Giwargis; Thomas, metropolitan of Beth Qatraye; Ishoyahb, bishop of Dayrin; Sargis of Trihan; Estaphanus of the Mazunaye; Pusay of Hagar; and Shahin of Hatta.

The journey and synod completed the reconciliation of Beth Qatraye with the catholicosate following the earlier dispute under Ishoyahb III. Thomas is the first metropolitan of Beth Qatraye attested in the surviving records. Kozah suggests that raising the region to metropolitan status may have been a concession intended to secure the reconciliation, although the sources do not state this directly.

The nineteen canons adopted at Dayrin address the maintenance of Christian communal boundaries under the new Islamic government. They required Christians to bring lawsuits before ecclesiastical judges rather than outside courts, discouraged unions between Christian women and non-Christians, prohibited polygyny and non-Christian burial customs, and regulated social contact with Jews, including visits to Jewish taverns. One canon exempted bishops from the poll tax and tribute imposed on laypeople. Several references occur to a gorup called hanpe, which in the context of this text may be referring principally to Muslims; the identification is not explicit in the canons themselves.

=== Monasticism ===
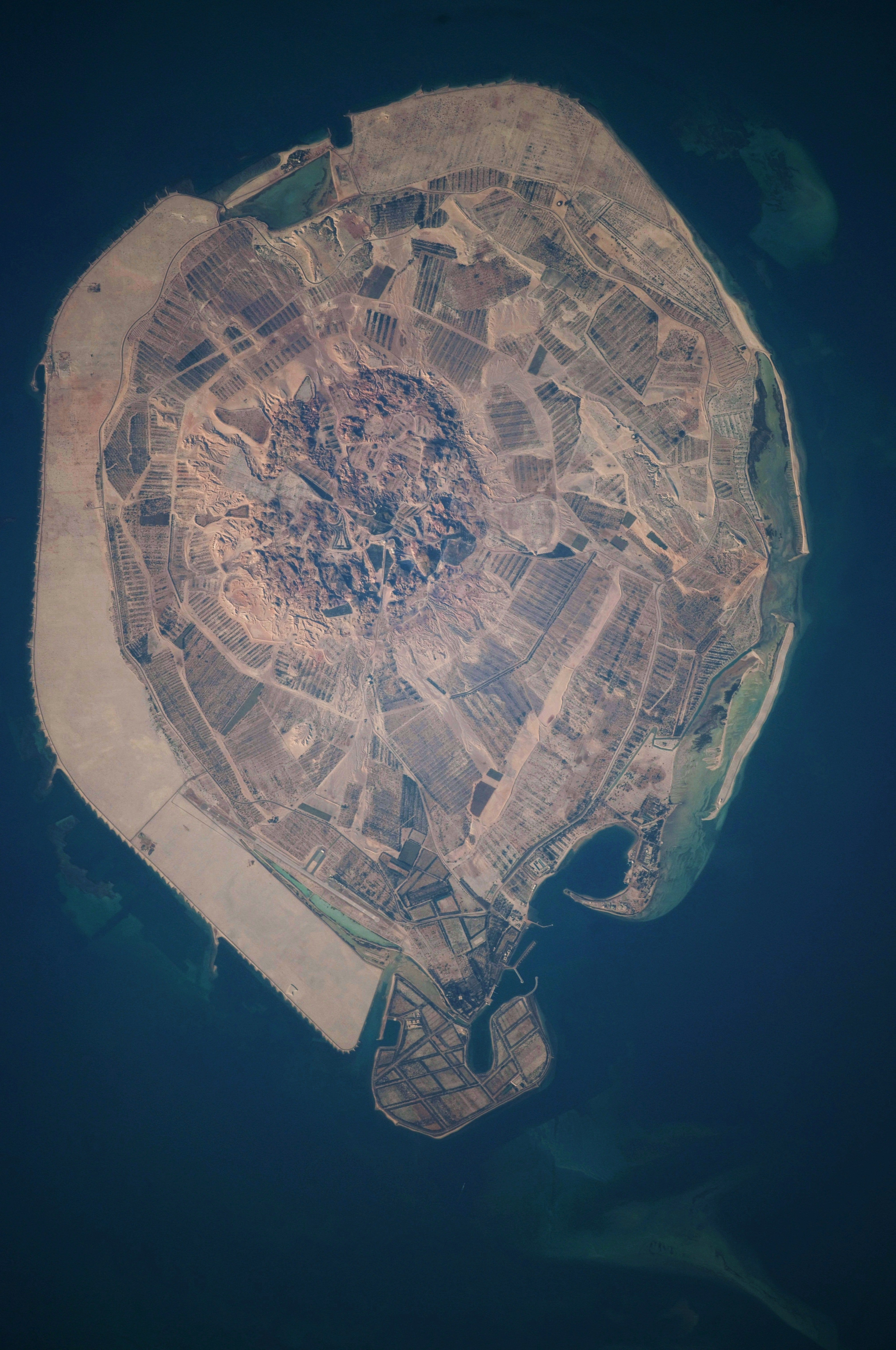
Aerial view of Sir Bani Yas Island

The region contained monasteries from the fourth to ninth centuries. Syriac narrative sources such as the History of Mar Yawnan place monastic life as taking place on several Gulf islands. Archaeological discoveries have verified that Christian sites on Failaka, Kharg, and Sir Bani Yas had monasteries. These sites date broadly to the seventh or eighth century and are usually associated with the Church of the East.

Kozah argues that the Christian monastic sites of the Gulf should be understood within a wider island network rather than as isolated settlements. In this interpretation, monasteries stood near maritime routes and, in some cases, close to pearling and trading communities.

=== Literary activity ===
All of the known writers associated with Beth Qatraye flourished between the end of the sixth century and the end of the seventh century. Their number and the range of their writings have led scholars to propose that the region possessed a school, perhaps based in one or more churches or monasteries. Such an institution is, however, not attested by literary or archaeological sources, and so historians draw caution: Beth Qatraye's scholarly milieu may have been transmitted through schools or within learned families and networks.

The best-known surviving authors from Beth Qatraye are the late seventh-century ascetic writers Isaac of Nineveh and Dadisho Qatraya. Isaac was born, educated, and initially active in Beth Qatraye before Giwargis I took him to Beth Aramaye and appointed him bishop of Nineveh. His writings comprise several collections of monastic instruction, and his imagery of merchants, sailors, harbors, islands, and pearls has been interpreted as reflecting the maritime environment of his homeland. Dadisho wrote a commentary on the Asceticon of Abba Isaiah, a commentary on the Paradise of the Fathers, discourses on solitude, and a letter to a monk named Abqosh.

Biblical exegesis formed one part of Beth Qatraye's literary culture. Ahob of Qatar, whose period of literary activity is often placed in the sixth century, composed Old and New Testament scholia and an introduction to the Psalms; his interpretations were excerpted and reworked by later East Syriac commentators. In the first half of the seventh century, Gabriel the Interpreter of Mahoze, also called Gabriel Arya or Rabban Gabriel Qatraya, wrote commentaries on the Old and New Testaments. His known connection to Beth Qatraye is his relationship to Isaac of Nineveh, rather than evidence that he worked in the region itself. Ishopanah Qatraya was credited with works that are now lost, and a "Jacob Qatraya" is known only from a quotation preserved by the fifteenth-century author Isaac Shbadnaya.

Other writers concentrated on liturgy and theology. Jacob, bishop of Dayrin, sent Ishoyahb I a series of questions on liturgical practice around 585; the patriarch's responses and twenty canons have survived to the present. Gabriel bar Lipah Qatraya produced a commentary on the liturgy in five discourses (memre) arranged as questions and answers, and this work was later abbreviated by Abraham bar Lipah. Gabriel Qatraya owned and collated a Peshitta New Testament manuscript copied in 614 or 615, while another author of the same name composed two theological treatises, Discourse on the Union and Solutions to Questions on the Matter of the Faith.

Beth Qatraye also participated in the movement of texts between languages. An anonymous seventh-century monk from the region translated the law book of Shemon of Rev Ardashir from Middle Persian into Syriac. Another Christian from Beth Qatraye reportedly served as the Persian translator of the Arabic-speaking Lakhmid king al-Nu'man III ibn al-Mundhir. Literary production declined sharply after the seventh century, and no comparable group of writers from eighth-century Beth Qatraye is known.

=== Letters of Ishoyahb III ===
During his patriarchate, Ishoyahb III addressed five letters to the Christians of Beth Qatraye. Usually numbered 17C–21C, they were directed respectively to the region's bishops, its Christian population, and its monks. The letters belong to a larger collection of 106 surviving letters from Ishoyahb's career, and were probably written during an ecclesiastical crisis of the early 650s. A complete English translation of these letters was published in 2015 by Mario Kozah.

The cause for Ishoyahb sending his letters related to a dispute over the relationship between Beth Qatraye, the metropolitan province of Fars, and the patriarchal see at Seleucia-Ctesiphon. The bishops of Beth Qatraye supported independence from the patriarchate in a movement led by Shem'on, the metropolitan of Fars. According to Ishoyahb, they recorded their position in a signed petition and brought their case before the contemporary secular authorities. A synod at Seleucia-Ctesiphon deposed the bishops of Fars and Beth Qatraye, although Ishoyahb suspended the sentence while delegations were sent to seek their submission.

Letter 17 was addressed directly to the bishops and demanded their return to patriarchal communion. Letters 18 and 19 appealed instead to the Christian population of Beth Qatraye. Ishoyahb urged them to reject their existing bishops, elect replacements, and send the candidates to him for canonical ordination. These letters also distinguish obedience to the new secular government, including the payment of taxes, from submission to ecclesiastical authority. Bcheiry interprets the rulers approached by the bishops as the Muslim Arab authorities and identifies Ishoyahb's "great ruler" with the caliph Uthman.

Letters 20 and 21 were sent to the monks of Beth Qatraye. The monks had remained loyal to the patriarch and consequently faced condemnation and excommunication from the local hierarchy. Under pressure from their bishops, they asked Ishoyahb whether they could compromise and remain in communion with the disputed clergy. He refused, maintaining that clergy ordained outside the canonical hierarchy lacked valid ecclesiastical authority and instructing the monks to separate from them.

The letters are highly polemical accounts written from the patriarch's point-of-view, but they preserve evidence for the agency of the bishops of Beth Qatraye, as well as its congregations and monasteries in the first decades of Islamic rule. They show that local Christians had relations with the new government and that they could appeal to it in ecclesiastical disputes, while the oversea's patriarchate sought to preserve its authority in the region through synods, episcopal ordination, and control of communion. The letters also contain a large amount of important information related to the geography of Beth Qatraye and nearby Christian regions, such as Mazun (modern-day Oman), in seventh-century eastern Arabia.

== Language ==
The local vernacular of Beth Qatraye is known in Syriac sources as Qatrayith (or Qatrayit), meaning "Qatari" or "in Qatari". It was distinct from literary Syriac, which remained the written language of the region's Christian authors and ecclesiastical institutions. No surviving text was written in Qatrayith. Instead, the little surviving information about its lexicon comes from a small number of lexical glosses preserved in Syriac sources, especially biblical and exegetical material.

Earlier scholarship treated Qatrayith as a local vernacular influenced by Aramaic, Arabic and Persian. Mario Kozah later argued, on the basis of an expanded corpus of roughly forty lexical items, that Qatrayith was an early dialect of Arabic. Ahmad Al-Jallad has challenged this classification, arguing that the evidence does not support identifying Qatrayith simply as Arabic. In his reassessment, Qatrayith words share correspondence not only with Arabic words but with those of many other languages too, including Aramaic, Persian, Akkadian, shared Semitic forms, or words of unknown origin.

Al-Jallad argues that Qatrayith was a discrete Semitic variety of eastern Arabia, distinct from both the modern Arabic dialects of the Gulf and from Hasaitic, the earlier epigraphic language of eastern Arabia. Its vocabulary reflects the multilingual environment of the Gulf, including long-standing contact with Mesopotamia, Iran and Arabic-speaking groups from elsewhere in Arabia. On this interpretation, Qatrayith may preserve evidence for the linguistic diversity of eastern Arabia before the full Arabicization of the region.

== Economy ==
Beth Qatraye lay on maritime routes linking the Gulf with Oman, Fars, Basra, India, East Asia, and the east coast of Africa. Mario Kozah argues that its islands functioned as trade stations where monastic life was allowed to overlap with merchant activity, pearl fishing, and maritime exchange.

The pearl industry was especially important. Isaac of Qatar, who came from Beth Qatraye, repeatedly used imagery of merchants, sailors, islands, harbors, and pearls in his ascetic writings; Kozah interprets this imagery as reflecting the maritime and pearling environment of Isaac's birthplace. The History of Mar Yawnan also refers to a pearl merchant from Beth Qatraye whose encampment lay near the Monastery of Rabban Thomas, suggesting a close relationship between monastic sites and pearl-fishing communities.

Later Arabic geographical sources describe several Gulf islands associated with the wider Beth Qatraye milieu as prosperous trading places, especially in connection with pearls, agriculture, shipping, shipbuilding, and traffic between Persia and India. These later reports cannot simply be projected unchanged into late antiquity, but Kozah uses them alongside Syriac and archaeological evidence to reconstruct the economic role of the islands from the seventh to tenth centuries.

== See also ==
- Christianity in Eastern Arabia
- Mazun (historical region), also known as Beth Mazunaye
