= Languages of pre-Islamic Arabia =

Languages attested in Arabia before Islam

The languages of pre-Islamic Arabia were the spoken and written languages attested in the Arabian Peninsula and its frontier zones before the rise of Islam in the seventh century. Some languages are known from pre-Islamic inscriptions, and others are only known from short texts or later attributions by Arabic scholars. The main indigenous languages attested in Arabia were Semitic languages, especially Ancient South Arabian, Ancient North Arabian, and Old Arabic, but the peninsula also formed part of a wider written environment in which Aramaic, Greek, Syriac, Middle Persian, Hebrew, Ethiopic, and other languages appeared and interacted in various settings and were sometimes used in matters of prestige across purposes of administration, religion, diplomacy, and elite communication.

The linguistic landscape of pre-Islamic Arabia was more complicated than a perennial Arabic dominance. The tens of thousands of inscriptions cover both forms of Old Arabic but other languages as well. For example, one separate group included the Ancient South Arabian languages, especially Sabaic, Minaic, Qatabanic, and Hadramitic.

The development of Arabic as a written language was a gradual process. Before the full development of the Arabic script in the late antique period of Arabia, particularly the use of Paleo-Arabic, many writing systems were used to write down spoken Arabic. These included Nabataean, North Arabian, South Arabian, and occasionally even the Greek alphabet.

== Sources and limitations ==
The languages of pre-Islamic Arabia are primarily known from pre-Islamic Arabian inscriptions. In South Arabia, the largest bodies of evidence are monumental inscriptions on stone or metal and minuscule inscriptions written on wooden sticks or palm-leaf stalks. The monumental inscriptions include dedicatory, building, legal, and commemorative texts, while the minuscule corpus preserves more everyday documents, including letters, legal deeds, instructions, and business records. In northern and central Arabia, the evidence is more often graffiti, short prayers, signatures, and texts associated with rock art, though the oasis of Dadān also produced a monumental inscriptional tradition.

Because many inscriptions are short and formulaic (for example, only having the name of the author) it can be difficult to identify the exact language of many inscriptions. In other cases, an author may have written in a prestige language that he would not have used for ordinary speech, leading to MacDonald's suggestion that one needs to distinguish between scripts, languages, and social uses of writing, and his warning against older terms that confused "Arabian" with "Arabic". Debié likewise emphasizes that pre-Islamic Arabs lived in a multilingual and allographic environment, in which Arabic and other local languages could be written in several scripts and elite groups could operate in Greek, Syriac, Nabataean Aramaic, Middle Persian, and other written languages.

== Classification ==
The following list preserves the main languages and written languages attested in or around pre-Islamic Arabia. Some entries are languages in the strict sense, while others are conventional labels for inscriptional corpora, scripts, or poorly understood groups of texts.

- West Semitic languages
  - Central Semitic languages
    - Arabic
      - Old Arabic
    - Ancient North Arabian languages
      - Oasis North Arabian
        - Dadanitic
        - Taymanitic
        - Dumaitic
      - Desert North Arabian
        - Safaitic
        - Hismaic
        - Thamudic B, C, D and F
        - Hasaitic
    - Ancient South Arabian
      - Sabaic
        - Early, Middle and Late Sabaic
        - Amiritic or North Sabaic
        - South Sabaic and Himyaritic-related forms
      - Minaic or Madhābic
      - Qatabanic
      - Hadramitic
      - Awsanic
  - Northwest Semitic languages
    - Aramaic
      - Nabataean Aramaic
      - Syriac
      - Jewish Aramaic
    - Hebrew
- South Semitic languages
  - Ethiopic
  - Modern South Arabian languages
- Other Semitic languages or regional varieties
  - Qatrayith
- Iranian languages
  - Middle Persian
- Other contact languages
  - Greek
  - Latin

== North Arabian and Old Arabic ==
=== Ancient North Arabian ===
The term Ancient North Arabian has been used for a group of inscriptions from northern and central Arabia written in varieties of the South Semitic script that are not Ancient South Arabian. Michael C. A. MacDonald classified these into Oasis North Arabian inscriptions (including Taymanitic, Dadanitic, Dumaitic) and Desert North Arabian inscriptions (including Safaitic, Hismaic, Thamudic, and possibly Hasaitic).

Recent scholarship has questioned whether Ancient North Arabian is a single language family.

=== Safaitic and Hismaic ===
Safaitic and Hismaic are modern names for two large bodies of inscriptions primarily found in the Syro-Arabian desert, southern Syria, Jordan, northwestern Arabia, and their respective adjoining areas. Tens of thousands of these inscriptions are known. The texts are usually informal, often carved by pastoralists, and include names, genealogies, prayers, laments, and references to movement, herding, raiding, and brief mentions or allusions to political events.

Although older scholarship often separated these inscriptions from Arabic because many use a definite article written h-, Al-Jallad has argued that the linguistic features of Safaitic, and to a lesser extent Hismaic, place them within Arabic in genealogical terms. These features include elements of Arabic negation, the mafʿūl passive participle, the use of ʾan as a complementizer, Arabic-like prepositions and particles, and other morphological and syntactic traits. The variety of article forms in these inscriptions also shows that the shape of the definite article alone is not a reliable criterion for separating Arabic from other North Arabian languages.

=== Dadanitic ===
Dadanitic was the script and language of the oasis of Dadān, modern al-ʿUlā, in northwestern Arabia. It replaced older labels such as "Dedanite" and "Lihyanite" for the language of the inscriptions from this oasis. Dadanitic is important because, unlike most North Arabian corpora, it includes a monumental tradition as well as shorter texts.

Dadanitic appears to be distinct from Arabic, though the oasis was not linguistically isolated. Al-Jallad identifies features that distinguish Dadanitic from Proto-Arabic, including the retention of an anaphoric third-person pronoun, different treatment of the feminine ending, and evidence for both h- and ʾ- causatives. At the same time, individual texts or features point to contact with Old Arabic or the presence of Arabic speakers in the oasis.

=== Taymanitic ===
Taymanitic is the name for the script and language associated with the oasis of Tayma in northern Arabia. It was formerly grouped under "Thamudic A" or called "Taymanite". Its linguistic profile differs from Arabic: among other features, it shows a shift of word-initial w to y, as in forms comparable to Northwest Semitic, and does not exhibit the defining innovations of Arabic.

=== Thamudic and unclassified texts ===
Thamudic is a conventional label for several groups of inscriptions that are not necessarily related to one another and should not be equated with the historical tribe of Thamud. Modern scholarship commonly distinguishes Thamudic B, C, D, and F, while former Thamudic A and E are now usually called Taymanitic and Hismaic. The Thamudic texts are often short and difficult to interpret, and their linguistic classification remains uncertain.

=== Hasaitic ===
Hasaitic is a poorly understood dialect from eastern Arabia and the Gulf region. It has often been discussed in relation to the South Arabian script because several texts are written in a related monumental alphabet, but the language itself remains difficult to classify.

=== Old Arabic ===
Old Arabic is a term that refers to the phase of the Arabic language before the Islamic conquests. It was not standardized in this period of time, and existed as a variety of dialects. Old Arabic is attested in inscriptions from the following scripts: Safaitic, Hismaic, Dadanitic, Nabataean, Nabataeo-Arabic, Paleo-Arabic, and a few Greek transcriptions. Old Arabic also differs in important ways from Classical Arabic. Its evidence shows variation in definite marking, preservation of older phonological features, and dialectal diversity before the standardizing effects of the Qur'anic and early Islamic written traditions.

Two important Old Arabic inscriptions in the Nabataean script are the ʿEn ʿAvdat inscription and the Namara inscription of 328 CE. Later inscriptions in early Arabic script include the inscriptions of Zabad, Jabal Usays, and Harran, as well as finds from Dūmat al-Jandal and Ḥimā. These texts are often brief, but they illuminate the gradual emergence of Arabic as a written language and the transition from Nabataean to Arabic script.

== Ancient South Arabian ==
Ancient South Arabian is a collective term for the Semitic languages of ancient Yemen and adjacent parts of southern Arabia. The four principal languages are Sabaic, Minaic, Qatabanic, and Hadramitic. They were written from at least the early first millennium BCE until the sixth century CE and are known almost entirely through inscriptions.

Despite the use of a shared script, these four idioms are considered distinct enough to be treated as separate languages. Ancient South Arabian is also not an early form of Arabic, nor is it the direct ancestor of the Modern South Arabian languages, which continue to be spoken by a few hundred thousand people in the Arabian Peninsula to this day.

=== Sabaic ===
Sabaic is the best-attested Ancient South Arabian language, with more than 5,500 published inscriptions. It was used in the kingdom of Sheba and later became the dominant written language of South Arabia. Sabaic is conventionally divided into Early, Middle, and Late phases, and Middle Sabaic includes regional dialects such as North, Central, and South Sabaic.

Late Sabaic emerged after the rise of Ḥimyar, drawing especially on South Sabaic forms mixed with elements of the Central Sabaic written standard. The relationship between the medieval reports of "Ḥimyaritic" and the epigraphic record remains debated: some scholars interpret medieval Ḥimyaritic as a separate non-Ṣayhadic language, while others view it as a later development related to Sabaic.

=== Minaic, Qatabanic and Hadramitic ===
Minaic, also called Madhābic, is known mainly from the Jawf region in northern Yemen, the heartland of the Minaean kingdom, but Minaic inscriptions are also attested in northwest Arabia, Egypt, and on Delos. Qatabanic was used in the kingdom of Qatabān, while Hadramitic is associated especially with the region of Shabwa and Raybun in Ḥaḍramawt.

The documentation for these languages is uneven. Qatabanic and Minaic are represented by substantial inscriptional corpora, while Hadramitic is less well documented in usable linguistic material despite many published fragments. These languages share many structural features with Sabaic but differ in pronouns, verbal morphology, and other grammatical details.

=== Script and writing culture ===
Ancient South Arabian was written in both monumental musnad and minuscule zabūr scripts. Monumental inscriptions were carved on stone, rock, or metal and were often formal public texts. Minuscule writing, by contrast, was used on portable wooden sticks and palm-leaf stalks for everyday documents such as letters, legal records, commercial instructions, and cultic notes.

This distinction matters for linguistic history because the source material that the minuscule corpus was written on was used for forms of communication and language use not normally visible in monumental epigraphy, providing novel insights into the more practical and day-to-day side of South Arabian society.

== Aramaic and Nabataean ==
Forms of Aramaic were used in and around Arabia for many centuries. Nabataean Aramaic was especially important in northwestern Arabia and the southern Levant. The Nabataeans used Aramaic as a written prestige language.

The development of the Arabic script is closely connected with Nabataean writing. Late Nabataean and Nabataeo-Arabic inscriptions occupy an intermediate position between Classical Nabataean Aramaic and the Arabic script. Debié notes that Paleo-Arabic should be understood within a wider late antique scribal environment that included Nabataean, Syriac, Greek, and other scripts.

== Greek and Syriac Christian contexts ==
Greek was the dominant language of administration and ecclesiastical hierarchy in the eastern provinces of the Roman Empire, including areas where Arab groups lived or served as allies. Greek inscriptions and literary sources document Arab phylarchs, military units, churches, and diplomatic exchanges. Some bilingual or mixed evidence also shows that individuals from nomadic or Arab communities could operate in Greek contexts.

Syriac was the major written language of several Christian communities in the Near East and eastern Arabia. Arab Christians could participate in churches whose liturgy, correspondence, and theological literature were written in Syriac or Greek. In the Gulf, the East Syriac milieu of Beth Qatraye produced Syriac Christian writers in the sixth and seventh centuries, such as Ahob of Qatar.

== Middle Persian and the Gulf ==
Middle Persian was the official Iranian language of the Sasanian Empire and was relevant in eastern and northeastern Arabia through Sasanian administration, military activity, and political influence.

== Hebrew, Jewish Aramaic and Ethiopic ==
Jewish communities in Arabia used Hebrew and Aramaic in religious settings. These inscriptions can be connected to a religious reading of the Torah, alongside forms of Jewish Aramaic.

Ethiopic is attested in South Arabia in connection with Aksumite activity and the wider Red Sea world. It was not one of the main indigenous languages of Arabia, but Ethiopic inscriptions and Aksumite political involvement show that South Arabia's linguistic landscape was connected to Ethiopia as well as to the Near East.

== Modern South Arabian and later Arabic dialects ==
The Modern South Arabian languages are non-Arabic Semitic languages spoken today in southern Arabia, especially in Oman, Yemen, and Socotra. They are not direct descendants of the Ancient South Arabian epigraphic languages, though both groups belong to the wider Semitic linguistic history of southern Arabia.

Modern Arabic dialects of the Arabian Peninsula preserve some features that illuminate older linguistic layers, especially in the south and southwest. In the southwest, some dialects preserve South Arabian-like features, including nasal definite articles, ḏ-based relative pronouns, and forms related to the ancient k-perfect.

== See also ==
- Arabic
- Ancient North Arabian languages
- Ancient South Arabian
- Languages of the Roman Empire
- Pre-Islamic Arabian inscriptions
- Warfare in pre-Islamic Arabia
- Writing systems of pre-Islamic Arabia
