= Abraham the Great of Kashkar =

Church of the East saint

Saint Abraham the Great

Founder of Abraham's Monastery on Mt. Izla
- Born: c. 492; Kashkar, Persia
- Died: 586; Persia
- Venerated in: Church of the East
- Feast: 6th Friday after Epiphany

Abraham the Great of Kashkar was the father of the monastic revival in the Church of the East in the 6th century. He is a doctor and saint of the Church of the East.

He was born in Kashkar in Persia around 492. He left there to preach the Gospel at Al-Hirah, leaving there to study monastic life at Scetes.

Monasticism was very popular in early Syrian and Mesopotamian Christianity. Some held the view that only a life of celibacy could lead to salvation. Initially, all monks and nuns were hermits, but in about 350 Mar Awgin founded the first cenobitic monastery of Mesopotamia on Mount Izla above the city Nisibis, patterned upon the Egyptian model. Soon there were many monasteries.

But at the synod of Beth Lapat the Church of the East decided that all monks and nuns should marry. Obviously, this was in order to please the Zoroastrian rulers, who held family life sacred. The decision severely weakened the church. The decision was reverted in 553.

In 571 Abraham founded and governed a new monastery on Mt. Izla. This became the famous monastery called the "Great Convent". The rules he established in 571 were published with those of Dadisho, his successor (588-604).

Abraham died in 586.

The third abbot of this monastery was his student Babai the Great (551–628), who succeeded Mar Dadisho. Born to a family of humble means, Abraham's feast day is celebrated on the 6th Friday after Epiphany.
