= Gabriel Arya =

Gabriel Arya (fl. late 7th century), also called Gabriel Qaṭraya, was a biblical exegete who wrote in Syriac. The byname Qaṭraya indicates that he was a native of Beth Qaṭraye (Qatar). Arya, the Syriac for lion, is probably a nickname. He was a member of the Church of the East.

Gabriel was a relative of Isaac of Nineveh, who became bishop around 676. According to a Syrian Orthodox source, Patriarch Giwargis I (c.659–680) met Isaac on a visit to Beth Qaṭraye and brought him back to Beth Aramaye because Gabriel was active there. This source refers to Gabriel as an "interpreter of the church". It is probable therefore that Gabriel is the same person as the Gabriel Qaṭraya mentioned in the nomocanon of Gabriel of Basra. This work survives only in fragments, but a now lost manuscript from Siirt (no. 67) contained a passage stating that Gabriel had taught at the school of Mahoze in Beth Aramaye and the future patriarchs Ḥenanishoʿ I (686–700) and Aba II (742–753) were among his students.

Gabriel's writings do not survive, but he is quoted frequently in biblical commentaries of the Church of the East from the 8th century onwards as a recognized authority on both the Old and New Testaments. He is usually cited as Gabriel Qaṭraya with the title rabban (teacher), but the Gannat Bussāme, quoting Ṣharbokht bar Msargis, uses both his surnames. As Gabriel Arya, he has an entry in the catalogue of Syriac writers created by ʿAbdishoʿ of Nisibis around 1300. According to ʿAbdishoʿ, he wrote a commentary on select passages from the Bible, called Salges mashlmanuta d-ṣurta, the "tradition (or transmission) of the scriptural text". ʿAbdishoʿ does not mention his origins, but does note his relationship to Isaac.

There were several Gabriels from Beth Qaṭraye active in the 7th century, which can cause confusion. Gabriel bar Lipeh, who wrote a commentary on the liturgy, was active early in the century. ʿAbdishoʿ of Nisibis has a separate entry for a Gabriel Qaṭraya who wrote a Discourse on the Union (i.e., the hypostatic union) and Resolution to Questions on the Matter of the Faith. Addai Scher and Carl Anton Baumstark believe this was the same person as Gabriel Arya, but Sebastian Brock argues that he was probably identical to the Gabriel Qaṭraya against whom Babai the Great (died 628) directed his Book of Causes and thus lived too early to be identical to Gabriel Arya.

== Bibliography ==
- Brock, Sebastian P. (1999). "Syriac Writers from Beth Qaṭraye". ARAM Periodical. 11 (1): 85–96. doi:10.2143/aram.11.1.504452.
- Kozah, Mario; Abu-Husayn, Abdulrahim; Al-Murikhi, Saif Shaheen; Al-Thani, Haya (2014). The Syriac Writers of Qatar in the Seventh Century (PDF). Gorgias Press. ISBN 978-1463203559.
- Wilmshurst, David (2011). The Martyred Church: A History of the Church of the East. East and West Publishing.
