= Yohannan the Leper =

Anti-patriarch of the Church of the East

Yohannan Garba ('the Leper'), originally metropolitan of Nisibis, was anti-patriarch of the Church of the East between 691 and 693. He opposed the claims of the legitimately-elected patriarch Hnanishoʿ I (686–98), who had offended the caliph ʿAbd al-Malik with a remark about Islam. In 693 Yohannan was disgraced and thrown into prison, where he died shortly afterwards. Hnanishoʿ's successor Sliba-zkha (714–28) removed Yohannan's name from the diptychs, and he is not included in the traditional list of patriarchs of the Church of the East.

== Sources ==
Brief accounts of Yohannan's patriarchate are given in the Ecclesiastical Chronicle of the Jacobite writer Bar Hebraeus (floruit 1280) and in the ecclesiastical histories of the Nestorian writers Mari (twelfth-century), ʿAmr (fourteenth-century) and Sliba (fourteenth-century).

== Yohannan's patriarchate ==
The following account of Yohannan's patriarchate is given by Bar Hebraeus:

Hnanishoʿ, who succeeded Yohannan Bar Marta in the dignity of catholicus, was consecrated at Seleucia in the year 67 of the Arabs [AD 686/7]. The metropolitan Yohannan of Nisibis, known as Garba ['the Leper'], was offended with him for the following reason. When ʿAbd al-Malik, son of Marwan, the king of the Arabs arrived in the land of Senʿar [Babylonia], Hnanishoʿ came to meet him and offered him the usual presents. The king said, 'Tell me, catholicus, what do you think of the religion of the Arabs?' The catholicus, who was always prone to give hasty answers, replied, 'It is a kingdom founded by the sword; and not, like the Christian faith and the old faith of Moses, a faith that is confirmed by divine miracles.' The king was angry, and ordered his tongue to be cut out, but several people interceded for him, and he was allowed to go free. All the same, the king commanded that he should not again be admitted into his presence. This incident gave Yohannan Garba an opportunity of realising his ambition. He bribed some officials to forge him a letter from the king to Bshir bar Malka, the governor of ʿAqula. Yohannan went to him, offering him gifts and handing him the king's letter. Bshir then summoned Hnanishoʿ, stripped him, and handed his patriarchal robe and staff of office to Yohannan. He then sent Yohannan to Seleucia, where the bishops were forced to consecrate him. Yohannan kept Hnanishoʿ locked up in a prison for a while, then packed him off with two of his disciples to one of the mountain monasteries. They made him climb up to the top of the mountain, and then threw him down. They thought he was dead, but some shepherds found him, saw that he was still breathing, took him back to their hut and looked after him. Eventually he left them and took shelter in the monastery of Yonan in the region of Mosul. Meanwhile Yohannan had borrowed large sums of gold in order to bribe the governor of ʿAqula, and when the time came for repayment was unable to meet his obligations. He was thrown into prison, and died there. Then Hnanishoʿ resumed his rule, and died after fulfilling his office for fourteen years.

Bar Hebraeus also mentioned that Yohannan's name was removed from the list of Nestorian patriarchs by the catholicus Sliba-zkha:

He removed the name of Yohannan Garba from the diptychs, reconsecrated the bishops consecrated by Garba, and put back the name of Hnanishoʿ, who had been oppressed by calumny, alongside those of the rest of the catholici.

== See also ==
- List of patriarchs of the Church of the East

== Notes ==
Church of the East titles
Preceded by Yohannan I (680–683)	Catholicos-Patriarch of the East (691–693)	Succeeded by Sliba-zkha (714–728)
