= History of Mar Yawnan =

Hagiography set in the early Islamic Persian Gulf

The History of Mar Yawnan (or the History of Saint Jonah) is a hagiographical work of Syriac literature set in the fourth century. It describes the life, miracles, and ascetic practices of Mar Yawnan, a Christian monk affiliated with monastic communities of northern Mesopotamia and the Persian Gulf. He is presented as the founder of a famous monastery of the Church of the East along the Euphrates, and as a disciple of the Egyptian famous monastic saint, Mar Awgin. The History is notable for being the only known hagiography interested in the Persian Gulf region, where many monasteries have been excavated and studies in recent decades.

The text presents its author as the abbot Zadoy, a contemporary of Mar Yawnan in the fourth century, based in a monastery on the "Black Island". The "Black Island" may be Sir Bani Yas island (off the coast of modern-day UAE) in the region of Beth Qatraye, and the monastery mentioned by the Life may be the same as a monastery discovered by archaeologists on the island in the 1990s, the Sir Bani Yas monastery.

Modern scholarship has rejected the stated authorship of the History as a literary fiction, dating the composition of the text to the late seventh or early eighth century. Nevertheless, the work is a significant source for the study of monasticism in the early Islamic Persian Gulf, particularly for understanding the coexistence of coenobitic and solitary asceticism and the economic foundations of monastic institutions in Eastern Arabia.

== Date ==
The History of Mar Yawnan was composed in the late seventh or early eighth century, despite its internal claim that Mar Yawnan lived in the fourth century. Whereas early scholarship accepted the self-presentation of the text, as a contemporary and early account of Persian Gulf monasticism, this has since been rejected on textual and historical grounds.

The story associates Mar Yawnan with saints such as Mar Awgin and Mar Qardagh, whose own hagiographical traditions emerged in the late sixth and seventh centuries. The monastic, economic, and ideological context and concerns of the text also reflect an early Islamic period rather than late antiquity. The text, however, was known to Ishoʿdnah of Basra in the mid-ninth century, meaning that the mid-ninth century functions as its terminus ante quem.

== Structure ==
The History of Mar Yawnan is formally unusual within East Syriac hagiography. It is presented primarily as a first-person narrative, ostensibly spoken by an abbot of the monastery associated with Mar Yawnan. This abbot claims personal acquaintance with the saint and recounts both his own experiences and the testimony that he has received from other figures, like the anchorite Rabban Philon and his disciple, Papa.

Rather than functioning as a chronological biography, the text is structured around exemplary episodes like journeys, miracles, encounters with monks and lay patrons. These narratives present the reader with a normative vision of monastic authority, ascetic hierarchy, and economic exchange.

== Life of Mar Yawnan ==
According to the History, Mar Yawnan was of noble Roman descent and was raised on Cyprus, where he was educated in medicine and philosophy. His ascetic vocation was recognized early on by the bishop Epiphanius, who foretold his future role as a leader of solitaries.

After fleeing formal study to pursue the ascetic life, Mar Yawnan encountered Mar Awgen and accompanied him to Egypt, before returning to the Persian Empire to establish monastic foundations. He founded a monastery near Perōz-Šāpūr (Anbar) in northern Mesopotamia but later abandoned communal leadership in favor of the solitary life.

Mar Yawnan subsequently traveled to the Persian Gulf, where he resided at the Monastery of Mar Thomas (which some have identified as the Sir Bani Yas monastery) on an island off the coast of Eastern Arabia. There, he lived in a cell apart from the main coenobium and performed miracles like healings, resurrections, and the supernatural provision of food. Among the most famous episodes is a journey across the sea on the back of a giant crab to visit the anchorite Rabban Philon on a neighboring island.

Ultimatwly, Mar Yawnan returns to northern Mesopotamia, where he continues to perform miracles and convert elite figures before finally disappearing.

== Historical context ==
=== Monastic context ===
The History of Mar Yawnan reflects the expansion of coenobitic monasticism within the Church of the East during the late seventh and early eighth centuries, particularly in the Persian Gulf and Eastern Arabia. Archaeological evidence from sites such as Kharg Island (part of modern-day Iran) and the Sir Bani Yas island (part of the modern-day United Arab Emirates) demonstrates the emergence of large, organized monastic complexes during this period.

These monasteries combined communal living with a hierarchy of solitary ascetic practices. The text depicts a structured relationship between coenobites and solitaries, with anchorites occupying the highest ascetic rank while remaining institutionally connected to the monastery. The abbot functioned as mediator between these groups, embodying both administrative authority and ascetic prestige.

The narrative also reflects broader ideological debates within East Syriac monasticism, particularly tensions between traditional solitary asceticism and the wealth-dependent institutions of coenobitic life. By presenting Mar Yawnan as an anchorite who legitimates communal structures, the text seeks to reconcile these competing ideals.

=== Economic context ===
The History of Mar Yawnan provides rare insight into the economic foundations of monasticism in the early Islamic Persian Gulf. Monasteries depended heavily on donations from Christian merchants engaged in regional and long-distance trade, particularly in pearls, wine, and other goods transported by sea.

One episode describes a merchant donating a trading ship, which was sold for 1,300 dinars. The proceeds were used to purchase land, date palm orchards, and to restore the monastery's church. Therefore, the accounts of the History of Mar Yawnan help to show how capital was commercially converted into landed wealth and into ecclesiastical infrastructure.

Date palms and imported wine were central to monastic subsistence and liturgy. The narrative repeatedly emphasizes miracles involving the multiplication of dates and wine, symbolically transforming ordinary commodities into divine "blessings". This language enabled monks to simultaneously maintain a position of the ascetic detachment from wealth while participating in the economy.

Through these episodes, the History of Mar Yawnan redefines monastic consumption itself as an ascetic act, linking daily sustenance to the sanctity of the founding holy man and neutralizing the moral tensions inherent in wealth accumulation.

== Editions and translations ==
- Syriac edition: Paul Bedjan Acta Martyrum et Sanctorum [= AMS], I (Leipzig, 1890), pp. 466–525.
- English translation: Sebastian Brock, "The History of Mar Yawnan" in An Anthology of Syriac Writers from Qatar in the Seventh Century. Gorgias Press, pp. 1-42.
