= Ahob of Qatar =

Sixth-century East Syriac biblical commentator

Ahob of Qatar (Aḥob Qaṭraya; fl. late 6th century) is the earliest known East Syriac biblical commentator and scholar associated with the intellectual culture of the Beth Qatraye region in eastern Arabia, a center of Christianity in pre-Islamic Arabia. He was born in modern-day Qatar, and later, moved to Seleucia in modern-day Iraq. Although most of his writings survive only as excerpts in later commentaries, his complete Cause of the Psalms and thirty-five scholia on the Old Testament have been identified. His writings were widely translated, originally in Syriac, into Arabic, Geʽez, and Amharic, and they were copied or reworked into the nineteenth century.

== Name and identity ==
Ahob's name appears in several forms in the manuscript tradition. The form Aḥob is used in the earliest modern edition of the medieval catalogue of Abdisho bar Berika, whereas later manuscripts and editions often use the form Ayyub (the Syriac form of Job) or Ḥob. Today, historians agree that Aḥob was the original form, and some work connects the variants to a practice where scribes replaced uncommon names with "Job" because it was a familiar biblical name.

Seth Stadel identifies Ahob with Ayyūb the Exegete of Seleucia mentioned in the Chronicle of Seert and reappears in later Arabic ecclesiastical histories. These reports also say that, Ayyūb was considered for the office of Catholicos of the East some time between the years 580 to 583 AD after the death of his predecessor Ezekiel, but Ishoyahb I was chosen instead. Furthermore, some sources call Ayyūb a relative of the famous Syriac poet Narsai, but this relationship has not yet been demonstrated.

== Life and historical setting ==
Little direct information about Ahob's life survives. On the basis of his byname and the notices concerning Ayyūb, Stadel proposes that he was born in Qatar and later moved to Seleucia-Ctesiphon, where he gained a reputation as an exegete. His writing is associated with the intellectual culture of Beth Qatraye, a region dominated by the East Syriac scholastic culture while being located across the Qatar peninsula, Bahrain, and the surrounding northeastern Arabian coast. Ahob is the earliest named author known from this region, before the more well-documented and famous authors of the seventh century such as Isaac of Qatar. The location and form of his own education are unknown.

The date of Ahob's life and activity is not explicitly attested. Instead, it is inferred based on evidence from his writings. For example, Ahob refers to the writing of a genre of liturgical chant called ʿonyata. Because the earliest evidence for this genre is from John of Beth Rabban, who died in 566–567, Seth Stadel believes that Ahob's activity should post-date John's. Furthermore, Nathniel of Shirzor, writing around 600, cited Ahob's Cause of the Psalms, making ~600 AD the upper limit for his literary activity. Together with the ecclesiastical accounts of the patriarchal election, this evidence places Ahob in the late sixth century. Stadel also distinguishes him from a later monk of the same name who asked Dadisho Qatraya to compose a commentary on the Asceticon of Abba Isaiah.

== Works ==
According to the fourteenth-century Catalogue of Books by Abdisho bar Berika, Ahob wrote commentaries on the whole New Testament, the Pentateuch, and the Prophets, and he also wrote a commentary on the Beth Mawthbe ("Book of Sessions"). For the most part, these works have not survived in full (with the exception of his Cause of the Psalms), and are largely only known through citations, brief comments, quotations and adaptations by later authors.

=== Cause of the Psalms ===
Ahob's only complete surviving work is a short introduction to the Psalms is the Cause of the Psalms (which may also be called the Book of the Aims of the Psalms). It presents the Psalms as a compendium of prophecy, history, legislation, and wisdom and therefore as a particularly complete guide to divine knowledge. Ahob also explains the musical setting of the psalms as a means of sustaining the listener's attention and describes their recitation as central to Christian worship.

The work is partly adapted from the Syriac version of Basil of Caesarea's prologue to Psalm 1, but Ahob reworked rather than simply copied his source. It contains references to the memorized recitation of psalms, contemporary secular songs, painted or sculpted royal images, and the production of ʿonyata. Ahob's work was widely used by authors including Nathniel of Shirzor, Theodore bar Koni, and Ishodad of Merv, and it became an important source for later East Syriac accounts of the Psalter.

=== Biblical scholia ===
Ahob's surviving Old Testament scholia address passages in Genesis, Numbers, 1 Samuel, Psalms, and Sirach, among other books. Seth Stadel argues that these short interpretations were their original literary form rather than fragments cut from continuous commentaries. They may have originated as lecture notes or an instructional handbook connected with Ahob's teaching at the School of Seleucia, but this reconstruction remains conjectural. The surviving corpus probably represents only a small portion of a once larger collection.

The scholia are now dispersed across later works and manuscript collections. Their principal Syriac witnesses include the commentary on Genesis–Exodus 9:32, Theodore bar Konai's Scholion, the Denha–Grigor Commentary, Ishodad of Merv's biblical commentaries, an anonymous East Syriac commentary, Bar Bahlul's lexicon, and the writings of Isaac Shbadnaya. Because these authors sometimes abridged, combined, or disputed Ahob's explanations, the reconstruction of his wording requires comparison among the different witnesses.

== Exegetical approach ==
Ahob interpreted the Syriac Peshitta while drawing on the Antiochene tradition associated with Theodore of Mopsuestia. His identifiable sources include Syriac translations of Theodore's commentaries on Genesis and the Psalms, Basil's prologue to Psalm 1, the Syriac Physiologus, East Syriac liturgy, inherited cosmological teaching, and contemporary church architecture. His medical vocabulary may derive from Sergius of Reshaina's Syriac translations of Galen, and some of his Hebrew readings and descriptions of Jewish practice probably came from Jewish informants or earlier sources.

His explanations also cite words said to belong to the local language of Qatar at the time (Qatrayith), Middle Persian, and, incorrectly, Coptic. Seth Stadel regards the uses of Qatrayith as the earliest surviving references to this language and Ahob, and he also identifies Ahob as the earliest known East Syriac exegete to employ other languages when explaining difficult Peshitta expressions. The comments suggest that he worked in a multilingual environment connected with the wider Sasanian world.

While Ahob wrote in a milieu in which Theodore bar Konai was considered a major authority, he did not just passively copy Theodore's views. He sometimes modifies, or even rejects, Theodore's interpretations. Ahob's own positions broadly reflected the East Syriac Christology and on occasion relay brief arguments against Jewish interpretations, the idea of the eternity of the world, denials of divine providence, and Arian teachings.

== Reception ==
Ahob's literary afterlife began by about 600, when Nathniel of Shirzor adapted five passages from the Cause of the Psalms. During the following centuries his exegesis was incorporated into the commentary on Genesis–Exodus 9:32, Theodore bar Koni's Scholion, and the Denha–Grigor Commentary. Around 850, Ishodad of Merv used sixteen of his scholia and material from the Cause of the Psalms, usually reshaping the passages and occasionally presenting them in order to disagree.

Later witnesses include the tenth-century anonymous commentary, Bar Bahlul's lexicon, and Isaac Shbadnaya's fifteenth-century poem and prose commentary on divine governance. Material attributed to Ahob also entered Arabic biblical commentaries associated with Ibn al-Tayyib and from there circulated in Geʽez and Amharic, including the Ethiopian Andemta commentary tradition. The latest manuscripts of the Denha–Grigor Commentary that preserve his Psalm material date to the nineteenth century. Stadel consequently traces the reception of Ahob's writings across roughly thirteen centuries, even though much of the original corpus has been lost.
