= Mar Awgin =

Egyptian monk

Father of Monasticism in Mesopotamia
- Born: 4th century Suez, Egypt
- Died: 363; Nisibis, Turkey
- Venerated in: Oriental Orthodox Churches; Assyrian Church of the East; Ancient Church of the East; Maronite Church

Mar Awgin or Awgen (died 363 AD), (Note: Christine Chaillot states that Mar Awgin died in A.D. 370. However based on the Syriac text, according to E. A. Wallis Budge, it states that Mar Awgin died on the 21st of Nisan in A.D. 363, as an old man (while noting that there is some doubt about the accuracy of this date).) also known as Awgin of Clysma or Saint Eugenios, was an Egyptian monk who, according to traditional accounts, introduced Christian monasticism to Syriac Christianity. These accounts, however, are all of late origin and often contain anachronisms. The historicity of Awgin is not certain.

The earliest source to mention him dates to the 7th century, about three hundred years after his death. The claim that Awgin introduced monasticism to the Syriac tradition is roundly rejected by modern scholars, who regard it as an indigenous development. The story of Mar Awgin, whether having a factual basis or not, was embellished in order to associate Syriac monasticism with the more illustrious Egyptian tradition of the Desert Fathers.

== Biography ==
=== In Egypt ===
Originally, Saint Eugenios was a pearl-fisher from the island Clysma or Kolzum near Suez in Egypt. After having worked for 25 years, he joined the monastery of Pachomius in Upper Egypt, where he worked as a baker. He is reported to have possessed spiritual gifts and to have worked miracles, and he drew some following from among the monks.

According to the legendary History of Mar Yawnan, it was in Awgen's time at Egypt that he became the teacher of Mar Yawnan (Saint Jonah).

=== In Mesopotamia ===
About 70 monks accompanied him when he left Egypt for Mesopotamia, where he founded a monastery on Mt. Izla above the city of Nisibis.

The location was well chosen, for Nisibis lay on the eastern edge of the Roman Empire, which had just embraced Christianity as the official religion. The rest of Mesopotamia was under Sassanid rule, which tried to revive the Zoroastrian religion and occasionally persecuted the Christian population.

The community on Mt. Izla grew rapidly, and from here other monasteries were founded throughout Mesopotamia, Persia, Armenia, Georgia, and even India and China.

A crisis occurred during the 6th century: to please the Zoroastrian rulers, the Assyrian Church decided all monks and nuns should marry. Many subsequently transferred into the Miaphysite Church that followed West Syriac Rite, and spiritual life declined in the Assyrian Church as a result. But the reforms were soon reverted. Abraham the Great of Kashkar founded a new monastery on Mt. Izla, and he and his successor Babai the Great revived the strict monastic movement. Married monks were driven out, the teaching of the church was set on a firm orthodox basis, and Assyrian monasticism flourished for another thousand years.

== See also ==
- Abraham the Great of Kashkar (father of the Assyrian monastic revival in the 6th century)

== Sources ==
- Payne, Richard (2011). "Monks, Dinars, and Date Palms: Hagiographical Production and the Expansion of Monastic Institutions in the Early Islamic Persian Gulf". Arabian Archaeology and Epigraphy. 22: 97–111.
