= El Kulzom =

El Kulzom القلزم
- village
- Location in Egypt
- Coordinates: 30°21′52″N 31°18′47″E
- Country: Egypt
- Governorate: Qalyubia

Population (2006)
  - Total: 6,969
- Time zone: UTC+2 (EET)
  - Summer (DST): UTC+3 (EEST)

El Kulzom or Al Qelzam (Arabic: القلزم, from Ancient Greek: Κλυσμα, lit. 'rinsing water') is a village in the Qalyubia Governorate, Egypt.

== Notable people ==
- Mor Augin, an Egyptian Coptic monk.
