= Church of the East monastery on Sir Bani Yas =

7th century church in the U.A.E

Coordinates: 24°19′25.0″N 52°38′12.8″E

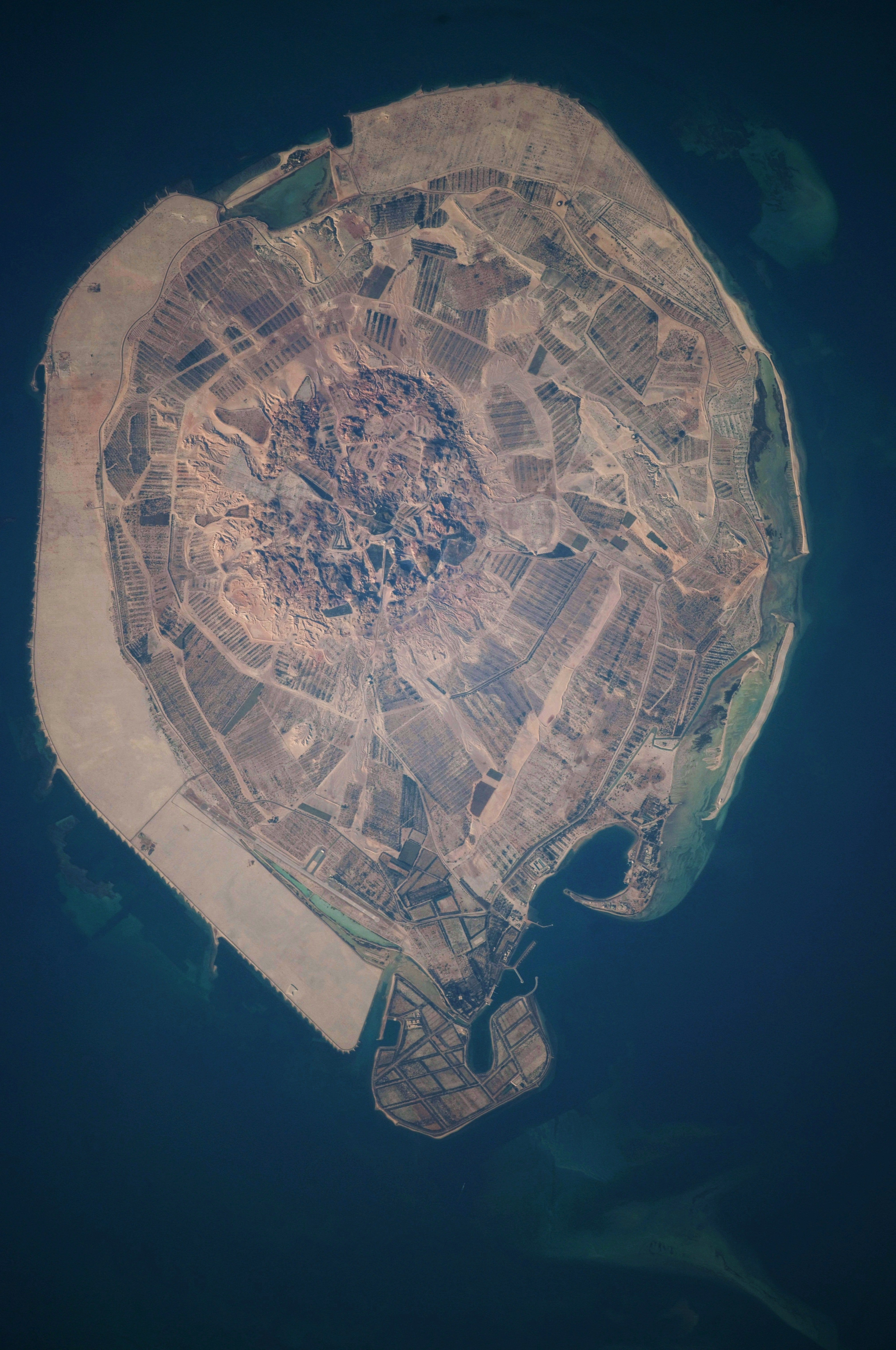
Aerial view of Sir Bani Yas Island

The Church of the East monastery on Sir Bani Yas is an archaeological site in the United Arab Emirates discovered in 1992. The site is significant as evidence of the presence of pre-Islamic Arabian Christianity in the UAE and belonged to the historical region of Beth Qatraye. Believed to be Nestorian, the Christian community continued for at least a century after the arrival of Islam.

The monastery was found through the investigative work of the Abu Dhabi Islands Archaeological Survey, or ADIAS, which documented sites and potential sites of archaeological significance across the Emirate of Abu Dhabi. With a mandate to preserve key sites of historical interest in the face of the Emirates' rapid development, ADIAS' work has resulted in dozens of surveys of critical sites across the Emirate. ADIAS' head, Peter Hellyer, was project director of the excavations of the monastery between 2009 and 2012.

In 1992 the remnants of an ancient buried building on the eastern side of the island of Sir Bani Yas were discovered, and through further excavations were found to be a 7th-century Church of the East Christian monastery which operated for 150 years. The site consists of a church, a monastery, and a series of courtyard houses, including dormitories, a kitchen, cells, and burial sites dating to the 7th and 8th centuries CE. The monastery is believed to have housed between 30 and 40 monks. The complex was built around the sole burial found on the site. Archaeological finds indicate contact with Bahrain, India and Iraq. the site is part of a series of Christian complexes across the Persian Gulf region including Kuwait at both Akkaz and Al Qusur on Failaka Island, at Kharg on the Iranian coastline and in the Eastern Province of Saudi Arabia at Jubail.

In 1995, Hellyer discovered a Christian cross in the form of a small piece of plaster, identifying it as a Christian site by comparing it to ancient churches known from elsewhere in the Persian Gulf region. Assessments by the team in charge of excavating the monastery concluded that the site was, at one time, home to about 30 monks from the Church of the East. Stucco decorations were found, including Nestorian crosses and vine and scroll motifs.

The complex is the oldest Christian site in the UAE, rivaled by the monastery on the Siniyah Island.

== Protection ==
In 2018, the Department of Culture and Tourism began designing and implementing new solutions to protect the site, which would ensure the preservation of the archaeological remains of the site from current environmental risks, reduce visual and physical impact, and enhance the visitor experience.

The visitor platform has a highly specialized design that is flexible and reversible, with the aim of providing effective and comprehensive protection against rain, heat, sand, wind, and nesting birds, and includes a drainage system with an elevated pedestrian path, interspersed with explanation points that support the visitor’s understanding and appreciation of the site’s details. The platform’s shading units are also manufactured with a roof made of Teflon (PTFE), a highly durable material that provides natural light and air, and are designed to be visually unobstructive to visitors, while they can be expanded in the future if new discoveries are made around the site. The platform is also equipped with artificial lighting to host evening tours.

Other improvements include a new access road with environmentally friendly, stable soil, and a new fence to keep out wildlife and sand, designed in harmony with the rest of the site.

== See also ==
- Qatrayith
