= Peter Hellyer =

British journalist and archaeologist (1947–2023)

Peter A. Hellyer (9 November 1947 – 2 July 2023) was a British-Emirati film-maker, journalist, historian and archaeologist. He was instrumental in building the United Arab Emirates' national press agency, WAM, and in cataloguing, celebrating and co-ordinating academic research on the archaeology and natural history of the Emirates.

== Early years ==
Peter Hellyer was born in London to Arthur and Grace Hellyer, a horticultural journalist and a teacher. He was educated at Oundle School in Northamptonshire and then graduated from the University of Sussex' School of African and Asian Studies in 1968 with a bachelor's degree in International Relations.

A committed activist from a young age, Hellyer joined the executive of the Anti-Apartheid Movement and, at 21, helped create the 1969 Stop the Seventy Tour campaign, launched to boycott all-white South African sporting teams attempting to visit the UK.

Hellyer first travelled to the Middle East in 1969 and subsequently accepted an assignment from film company UPITN (a joint venture between press agency United Press International and British broadcaster ITN), to film the official foreign visits of the founding father of the United Arab Emirates, Sheikh Zayed bin Sultan al Nahyan. The first such visit by Zayed was to France in July 1975 and Hellyer subsequently accompanied Zayed on trips to Iran, Egypt, Yemen, and Sri Lanka. He also filmed the rapid growth of the city of Abu Dhabi.

== Media roles ==
The UAE Ministry of Information and Culture approached Hellyer to establish the foreign language service of Abu Dhabi Radio, as well as the domestic English language Capitol Radio. By 1979 he was working to launch the English language service of the Emirates Press Agency, in Arabic Wakalat Anba'a al Emarat or WAM, working with the Agency's Palestinian-born director, Ibrahim Al Abed. This began a lifelong friendship between the two men. He returned to London in 1982 but continued to work with officials in Abu Dhabi. A life-long Liberal and ad advisor to Liberal leader David Steel, he took a key role in organising a delegation from the Liberal Party to visit Abu Dhabi and Sheikh Zayed and was subsequently recalled to Abu Dhabi in February 1985 to take up the post of launch editor of Emirates News, Abu Dhabi's first English language newspaper. He remained as managing editor of Emirates News until it was closed in January 1999. He was described, as a journalist, as 'fearless'.

Hellyer was an Advisor for Media, Environment and Heritage for the UAE Ministry of Information and Culture from 1999 to 2004, at which time he became Advisor for External Communications at the UAE National Media Council. In 2021 he transferred to act as an advisor to the UAE Ministry of Culture and Youth.

== Natural history ==
An enthusiastic amateur naturalist and a keen bird watcher, Hellyer chaired the Emirates Natural History Group from 1989 to 1992, launching its journal, Tribulus and founded the Emirates Bird Records Committee, collecting information on all species of native and migratory birds in the UAE. He was responsible for the preservation of a number of sites of natural beauty in Abu Dhabi, including the Al Wathba Lake.

== Archaeology ==
In 1992 he was made executive director of the Abu Dhabi Islands Archaeological Survey, or ADIAS, which documented sites and potential sites of archaeological significance across the Emirate of Abu Dhabi. With a mandate to preserve key sites of historial interest in the face of the Emirates' rapid development, Hellyer's work at ADIAS resulted in dozens of surveys of critical sites across the Emirate.

One of the key sites discovered by ADIAS under Hellyer was a pre-Islamic Christian monastery on Sir Bani Yas island in 1995. Between 2009 and 2012, he was project director of the excavations of the monastery.

He was also active in archaeological work in other emirates, including in Fujairah and Umm Al Quwain.

Hellyer wrote and edited a number of books on the archaeology, social and natural history of the Emirates and from 1991 to 2019 edited the journal of the Emirates Natural History Group, Tribulus. From 2008 until 2022 he was a regular columnist for Abu Dhabi-based English language daily The National.

He was granted Emirati citizenship in 2010 by Sheikh Khalifa bin Zayed Al Nahyan. He was awarded Abu Dhabi's highest civilian honour, the Abu Dhabi Medal, in 2013. Maintaining a second home in Jersey, he was an enthusiastic ambassador between the UAE and his island home, and was awarded the Silver Seal by the Bailiwick of Jersey in 2012. He was a founding member of the British Business Group, now the British Chamber of Commerce, Abu Dhabi.

His papers, including reports, correspondence, publications, news clippings, and audiovisual materials, are held as an archive at the New York University, Abu Dhabi.

== Works ==
Fujairah: An Arabian Jewel (1994)

Filling in the blanks: Recent archaeological discoveries in Abu Dhabi (1998)

Early Days in Abu Dhabi: The Origins of ADCO 1936-1971 (2001)

Archaeology of the United Arab Emirates: Proceedings of the First International Conference on the Archaeology of the UAE (ed. Potts, Daniel; Al Naboodah, Hasan; Hellyer, Peter)(2003).

Jebel Hafit, A Natural History (2004)

The Emirates - A Natural History (2005)

Fifty Years of Emirates Archaeology: Proceedings of the Second International Conference on the Archaeology of the UAE (ed. Potts, Daniel; Hellyer, Peter)(2012)

United Arab Emirates - A New Perspective (ed. Al Abed, Ibrahim; Hellyer, Peter) First published in 1997

His last work, The Natural History of Fujairah, was published posthumously.

Tribulus - the Journal of the Emirates Natural History Group - 1991-2019

== Personal life ==
Peter Hellyer had two children, Dr H. A. Hellyer and Perihan Peter Arthur Hellyer. His son, Dr H. A. Hellyer, is an academic, author and commentator. His daughter, Perihan, is based in Abu Dhabi, United Arab Emirates, and works in media relations and strategic communications. She is also a trustee of the ADAS and a committee member of the Emirates Natural History Group in Al Ain. Peter Hellyer also provided a home and education to Suzanne, a foster child in his care, who was given the Hellyer family name.

== Death ==
Peter Hellyer died in Abu Dhabi on 2 July 2023, at the Cleveland Clinic Abu Dhabi. He was widely mourned both in his adopted country and his second home, Jersey. On his death, WAM - the news agency he helped found - noted, "Hellyer's incredible devotion to the nation he loved will be remembered with great affection."
