= Ancient North Arabian languages =

Family of ancient Semitic languages

Ancient North Arabian
- Pre-Islamic North and East Arabian
- Native to: Jordan, Saudi Arabia, Syria, Yemen
- Region: Arabian Peninsula
- Extinct: 6th century
- Language family: Afroasiatic: Semitic; West Semitic; Central Semitic; North Arabian; Ancient North Arabian
- Writing system: Ancient North Arabian

Language codes
- ISO 639-3: xna
- Glottolog: anci1245

Ancient North Arabian languages are a hypothetical family of ancient Semitic languages represented in the Ancient North Arabian scripts. Among the languages of pre-Islamic Arabia, they are closely related to Old Arabic, although distinct from it.

== Varieties ==
=== Dadanitic ===
Dadanitic was the alphabet used by the inhabitants of the ancient oasis of Dadan (Biblical Dedān, modern Al-`Ula in north-west Saudi Arabia), probably some time during the second half of the first millennium BC.

=== Dumaitic ===
Dumaitic is the alphabet which seems to have been used by the inhabitants of the oasis known in antiquity as Dūma and later as Dumat Al-Jandal and al-Jawf. It lies in northern Saudi Arabia at the south-eastern end of the Wādī Sirḥān which leads up to the oasis of Azraq in north-eastern Jordan. According to the Assyrian annals Dūma was the seat of successive queens of the Arabs, some of whom were also priestesses, in the eighth and seventh centuries BC.

=== Hasaitic ===
Hasaitic is the name given to the inscriptions — mostly gravestones — which have been found in the huge oasis of Al-Hasa in north-eastern Saudi Arabia at sites like Thāj and Qatīf, with a few from more distant locations. They are carved in what may be an ANA dialect but expressed in a slightly adapted form of another member of the South Semitic script family, the Ancient South Arabian alphabet.

=== Hismaic ===
Hismaic is the name given to the Old Arabic texts carved largely by nomads in the Ḥismā desert of what is now southern Jordan and north-west Saudi Arabia, though they are occasionally found in other places such as northern Jordan and parts of northern Saudi Arabia outside the Ḥismā. They are thought to date from roughly the same period as the Safaitic, i.e. first century BC to fourth century AD, though there is even less dating evidence in the case of Hismaic.

=== Safaitic ===
Safaitic is the name given to the alphabet and variety of Old Arabic used by tens of thousands of ancient nomads in the deserts of what are now southern Syria, north-eastern Jordan, and northern Saudi Arabia. Occasionally, Safaitic texts are found further afield, in western Iraq, Lebanon, and even at Pompeii. They are thought to have been carved between the first century BC and the fourth century AD, though these limits can be no more than suggestions based on the fact that none of the approximately 35,000 texts known so far seems to mention anything earlier or later than these limits.

=== Taymanitic ===
Taymanitic is the name given to the variety of Northwest Semitic and ANA script used in the oasis of Tayma. This was an important stopping point on the caravan route from South Arabia to the Levant and Mesopotamia. The Taymanitic alphabet is probably mentioned as early as c. 800 BC when the regent of Carchemish (on what is now the Turkish-Syrian border) claimed to have learned it. About the same time an Assyrian official west of the Euphrates reported that he had ambushed a caravan of the people of Taymāʾ and Sabaʾ (an ancient South Arabian kingdom, Biblical Sheba) because it had tried to avoid paying tolls. There are two Taymanitic inscriptions dated to the mid-sixth century BC, since they mention the last king of Babylon, Nabonidus (556–539 BC), who spent ten years of his seventeen-year reign in Taymāʾ.

=== Thamudic ===
Thamudic is a name invented by nineteenth-century scholars for large numbers of inscriptions in ANA alphabets which have not yet been properly studied. It does not imply that they were carved by members of the ancient tribe of Thamūd. These texts are found over a huge area from southern Syria to Yemen. In 1937, Fred V. Winnett divided those known at the time into five rough categories A, B, C, D, E. In 1951, some 9000 more inscriptions were recorded in south-west Saudi Arabia which have been given the name 'Southern Thamudic'. Further study by Winnett showed that the texts he had called 'Thamudic A' represent a clearly defined script and language and he therefore removed them from the Thamudic 'pending file' and gave them the name 'Taymanite', which was later changed to 'Taymanitic'. The same was done for 'Thamudic E' by Geraldine M.H. King, and this is now known as 'Hismaic'. However, Thamudic B, C, D and Southern Thamudic still await detailed study.
