= Hnanisho I =

Ḥnanishoʿ I, called Ḥnanishoʿ the Exegete, was patriarch of the Church of the East between 686 and 698. His name means 'mercy of Jesus'. Hnanishoʿ offended the caliph ʿAbd al-Malik with a remark about Islam, which gave his enemies the opportunity to dethrone him in 691. He spent the next two years of his reign either in prison or, after surviving a murder attempt, in hiding, while the throne of Seleucia-Ctesiphon was occupied by the anti-patriarch Yohannan Garba ('the Leper'). He was restored in 693, after Yohannan's disgrace and death. After his death he was rehabilitated by his successor Sliba-zkha.

== Sources ==
Brief accounts of the patriarchate of Hnanishoʿ are given in the Ecclesiastical Chronicle of the Jacobite writer Bar Hebraeus (floruit 1280) and in the ecclesiastical histories of the Nestorian writers Mari (twelfth-century), ʿAmr (fourteenth-century) and Sliba (fourteenth-century). A modern assessment of his reign is in David Wilmshurst's The Martyred Church.

== Hnanishoʿ's patriarchate ==
Hnanishoʿ was a student under Gabriel Arya at the School of Seleucia-Ctesiphon.

The following account of his patriarchate is given by Bar Hebraeus:

Hnanishoʿ, who succeeded Yohannan Bar Marta in the dignity of catholicus, was consecrated at Seleucia in the year 67 of the Arabs [AD 686/7]. The metropolitan Yohannan of Nisibis, known as Garba ['the Leper'], was offended with him for the following reason. When ʿAbd al-Malik, son of Marwan, the king of the Arabs arrived in the land of Senʿar [Babylonia], Hnanishoʿ came to meet him and offered him the usual presents. The king said, 'Tell me, catholicus, what do you think of the religion of the Arabs?' The catholicus, who was always prone to give hasty answers, replied, 'It is a kingdom founded by the sword; and not, like the Christian faith and the old faith of Moses, a faith that is confirmed by divine miracles.' The king was angry, and ordered his tongue to be cut out, but several people interceded for him, and he was allowed to go free. All the same, the king commanded that he should not again be admitted into his presence. This incident gave Yohannan Garba an opportunity of realising his ambition. He bribed some officials to forge him a letter from the king to Bshir bar Malka, the governor of ʿAqula. Yohannan went to him, offering him gifts and handing him the king's letter. Bshir then summoned Hnanishoʿ, stripped him, and handed his patriarchal robe and staff of office to Yohannan. He then sent Yohannan to Seleucia, where the bishops were forced to consecrate him. Yohannan kept Hnanishoʿ locked up in a prison for a while, then packed him off with two of his disciples to one of the mountain monasteries. They made him climb up to the top of the mountain, and then threw him down. They thought he was dead, but some shepherds found him, saw that he was still breathing, took him back to their hut and looked after him. Eventually he left them and took shelter in the monastery of Yonan in the region of Mosul. Meanwhile Yohannan had borrowed large sums of gold in order to bribe the governor of ʿAqula, and when the time came for repayment was unable to meet his obligations. He was thrown into prison, and died there. Then Hnanishoʿ resumed his rule, and died after fulfilling his office for fourteen years.

Bar Hebraeus also mentioned that Hnanishoʿ was rehabilitated after his death by his successor Sliba-zkha:

He removed the name of Yohannan Garba from the diptychs, reconsecrated the bishops consecrated by Garba, and put back the name of Hnanishoʿ, who had been oppressed by calumny, alongside those of the rest of the catholici.

== Literary achievement ==
Hnanishoʿ was a noted author. Besides composing homilies, sermons and epistles, he was the author of a life of his contemporary Sargis Dauda of Dauqarah near Kashkar. He also wrote a treatise On the Twofold Use of the School, in which he argued that schools and universities should be places of moral and religious training as well as of instruction in letters, and a commentary on the Analytics of Aristotle. His letters are an essential source for understanding the functioning of justice in the East Syrian world at the end of the 7th century.

Hnanishoʿ provides some insight into early Christian attitudes towards Islam. Commenting on Matthew 22:9, he obliquely refers to Islam as "some new folly" that claims Jesus was only a prophet. Bar Hebraeus, writing the 13th century, recorded the tradition that Hnanishoʿ, when asked "what do you think of the religion of the Arabs?" responded, "It is a religion established by the sword and not a faith confirmed by miracles, as the Christian faith and the old Law of Moses."

== Posthumous miracles ==
In 1349, Hnanishoʿ remains were exhumed by members of the Church of the East in Mosul. He had been buried in the monastery of Jonah on the east bank of the Tigris, and when the tomb was opened, his body, lying in a coffin of planewood, was said to have been found to be in a miraculous state of preservation.

The historian ʿAmr, who saw the body for himself, said that crowds came to view the dead patriarch, who seemed to be only sleeping.

The alleged grave of the prophet Jonah was discovered by Jalal al-Din Ibrahim al-Khatni during his reconstruction of the site as a congregational mosque in 1365. The Al-Nabi Yunus Mosque was built over the demolished site. When Timur visited it in 1393, it had undergone a remarkable transformation. Hnanishoʿ was no longer remembered, and Timur was shown the tomb of the prophet Jonah himself. The 'tomb of Jonah' still exists, and visitors are still shown a heavy planewood coffin, reverently shrouded with a green cloth, in which the prophet supposedly lies buried. Some historians suspect that for the past six centuries, the Muslim faithful have been paying their devotions to the petrified corpse of a Christian patriarch. The alleged tomb of Jonah was located at a corner of the mosque. The sarcophagus had a wooden zarih built around it.

In addition to Jonah's tomb, a modern shrine to the Naqshbandi shaykh Rashid Lolan was located next to the mosque. This shrine dates from the 1960s.

=== 2014 destruction ===
On 24 July 2014, the building was destroyed with explosives by the Islamic State, damaging several nearby houses. The Islamic State stated that "the mosque had become a place for apostasy, not prayer."

=== Archeological discoveries ===
In March 2017, after the IS was driven out, a system of tunnels, approximately 1 km (0.62 mi) long, were found under the remains of the mosque. Cuneiform inscriptions dated to the reign of Esarhaddon, ruler of the Neo-Assyrian Empire, have been found in these tunnels, dating the site as a palace built by Sennacherib (d. 681 BCE). In 2025, a 6-meter lamassu, the largest yet to be discovered, was uncovered at the throne room of the site.

== See also ==
- List of patriarchs of the Church of the East

== Notes ==
Church of the East titles
Preceded by Yohannan I (680–683); Vacant (683–686)	Catholicos-Patriarch of the East (686–698)	Succeeded by Vacant (698–714); Sliba-zkha (714–728)
