= Dadisho of Mount Izla =

Dadishoʿ (Note: Also spelled Dadīshōʿ, Dadîšôʿ or Dādišoʿ; in Latin Dadjesu.) (528/9–604) was a monk and author of the Church of the East. He was the second abbot of the great monastery of Mount Izla after its founder, Abraham of Kashkar. He has sometimes been conflated (e.g., by Giuseppe Assemani) with Dadishoʿ Qaṭraya, who lived a century later.

The biography of Dadishoʿ written by his successor as abbot, Babai the Great, is lost, but it was used as a source for Ishoʿdnaḥ's Book of Chastity (8th century) and Thomas of Marga's Book of Governors (9th century). According to Ishoʿdnaḥ, his family came from Beth Aramaye, but Babai says in another work that they were from Beth Daraye. In his youth, he studied in the school of Nisibis and later that of Arbela. Upon completing his formal education, he went into the mountains of Adiabene to live as an anchorite.

In Adiabene, Dadishoʿ was joined by several disciples, including Sahrowai, the future bishop of Arzun. He moved to the diocese of Marga and lived seven years in the monastery of Risha under Abbot Stephen the Great. He was one of Abraham of Kashkar's first disciples at Mount Izla, which is why he was chosen as Abraham's successor. Later sources, however, do not treat him as one of Abraham's spiritual children. According to Ishoʿdnaḥ, he governed the monastery as rišdayra (leader of the community) for only three months after the death of Abraham in 588. His rule is ignored completely in the Khuzistan Chronicle. He died at the age of 75 in the year 604, as shown by the Chronicle of Seert. He was regarded as a saint and eastern saints' calendars list him among the founders of Mount Izla. Thomas of Marga calls him "meek and lowly".

Dadishoʿ extended and completed the monastic rule written by his predecessor. He took it in a more centralizing and cenobitic direction. It is preserved in the Synodicon Orientale.

== Bibliography ==
- Brock, Sebastian P. (1999). "Syriac Writers from Beth Qaṭraye". ARAM Periodical. 11 (1): 85–96. doi:10.2143/aram.11.1.504452.
- Jullien, Florence (2015). "Dādišoʿ". Encyclopædia Iranica. Vol. Online edition.
- Scher, Addai (1906). "Notice sur la vie et les oeuvres de Dadîšôʿ Qaṭrāya". Journal asiatique. 10th ser. (7): 103–111.
- Tamcke, Martin (1991). "Theology and Practice of Communal Life according to Dadiso". The Harp. 4: 173–188.
- Van Rompay, Lucas (2018) [2011]. "Synodicon Orientale". In Sebastian P. Brock; Aaron M. Butts; George A. Kiraz; Lucas Van Rompay (eds.). Gorgias Encyclopedic Dictionary of the Syriac Heritage: Electronic Edition. Beth Mardutho [Gorgias Press].
- Võõbus, Arthur (1960). Syriac and Arabic Documents Regarding Legislation Relative to Syrian Asceticism. Stockholm: Estonian Theological Society in Exile.
