= Yohannan I =

Yohannan I bar Marta was patriarch of the Church of the East between 680 and 683.

== Sources ==
Brief accounts of Yohannan's patriarchate are given in the Ecclesiastical Chronicle of the Jacobite writer Bar Hebraeus (floruit 1280) and in the ecclesiastical histories of the Nestorian writers Mari (twelfth-century), ʿAmr (fourteenth-century) and Sliba (fourteenth-century).

== Yohannan's patriarchate ==
The following account of Yohannan's patriarchate is given by Mari:

Yohannan, also known as Bar Marta, came from a noble family of al-Ahwaz, and was educated in the school of Jundishapur. He later became metropolitan of Jundishapur, and was shortly afterwards elected patriarch. He was consecrated in al-Madaïn in the usual way. His health was very poor, and he died after sitting for only two years and a few days. He was buried in Mattuth.

A few more details are supplied by Bar Hebraeus:

At this period the catholicus Giwargis died and was succeeded by Yohannan Bar Marta, in the second year of Yazid, son of Muawiya, the king of the Arabs who ruled in Palestine. Yohannan was already old and bowed down in years, and subject to infirmities. After he had fulfilled his office for two years, he died and was succeeded by Hnanishoʿ the Great.

== See also ==
- List of patriarchs of the Church of the East

== Notes ==
Church of the East titles
Preceded by Giwargis I (661–680)	Catholicos-Patriarch of the East (680–683)	Succeeded by Vacant (683–685); Hnanishoʿ I (686–698)
