= Siniyah Island =

Island in the United Arab Emirates

Native name: جزيرة السينية (Arabic)
- Location within the United Arab Emirates Siniyah Island (Asia)

Geography
- Location: Persian Gulf
- Coordinates: 25°36′53″N 55°38′4″E
- Highest elevation: 3 m (10 ft)

Administration
- UAE
- Emirate: Umm Al Quwain

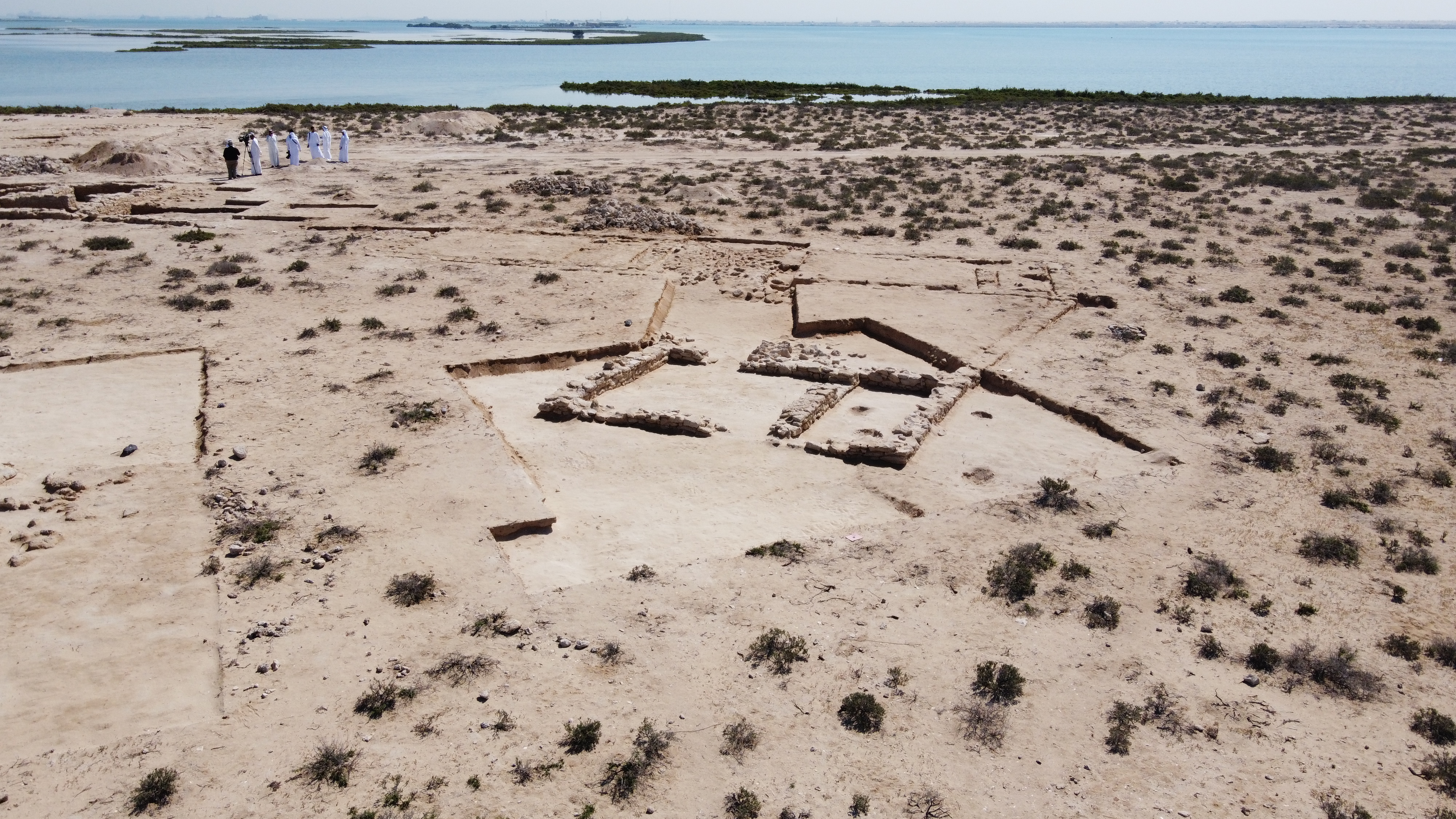
Part of the large 6th and 7th centuries pearl fishing and trading town found on Siniyah Island.

Siniyah Island (Jazīrat as Sīnīyah, Arabic: جزيرة السينية) is a natural island situated off the coast of the Emirate of Umm Al Quwain in the United Arab Emirates (UAE). It is the site of the oldest pearl fishing town in the Persian Gulf, and of an Eastern Christian Monastery and Bishop's Palace. The island's name means 'flashing lights', thought to be a reference to the harsh sunlight of the area.

Siniyah has been identified through recent archaeological and archival work as the potential centre of the lost ancient town and region of Tu'am or Tawwam, with the name Tu'am ultimately derived from St Thomas the Apostle of the East.

A gold coin of the Roman Emperor Tiberius, found at Siniyah, connects Rome to Ed Dur.

== Abandonment ==
Following several distinct periods of human occupation, Siniyah was eventually abandoned in the 1820s as a result of British bombardment of the settlement as part of the Persian Gulf campaign of 1819, in which a British expeditionary force blew up the town of Ras Al Khaimah before destroying fortifications and the larger boats of the towns of Umm Al Quwain, Ajman, Fasht, Sharjah, Abu Hail, and Dubai on 17 and 18 January 1820.

Julian Walker's 1955 survey of the land borders of the Emirates notes a ruined village on Siniyah Island, named Mallah, while J. G. Lorimer earlier noted Mallah as having an abandoned fort and the village of Siniyah with an old mosque. Lorimer claims the population abandoned Siniyah due to a lack of water resources.

== Pearling town ==
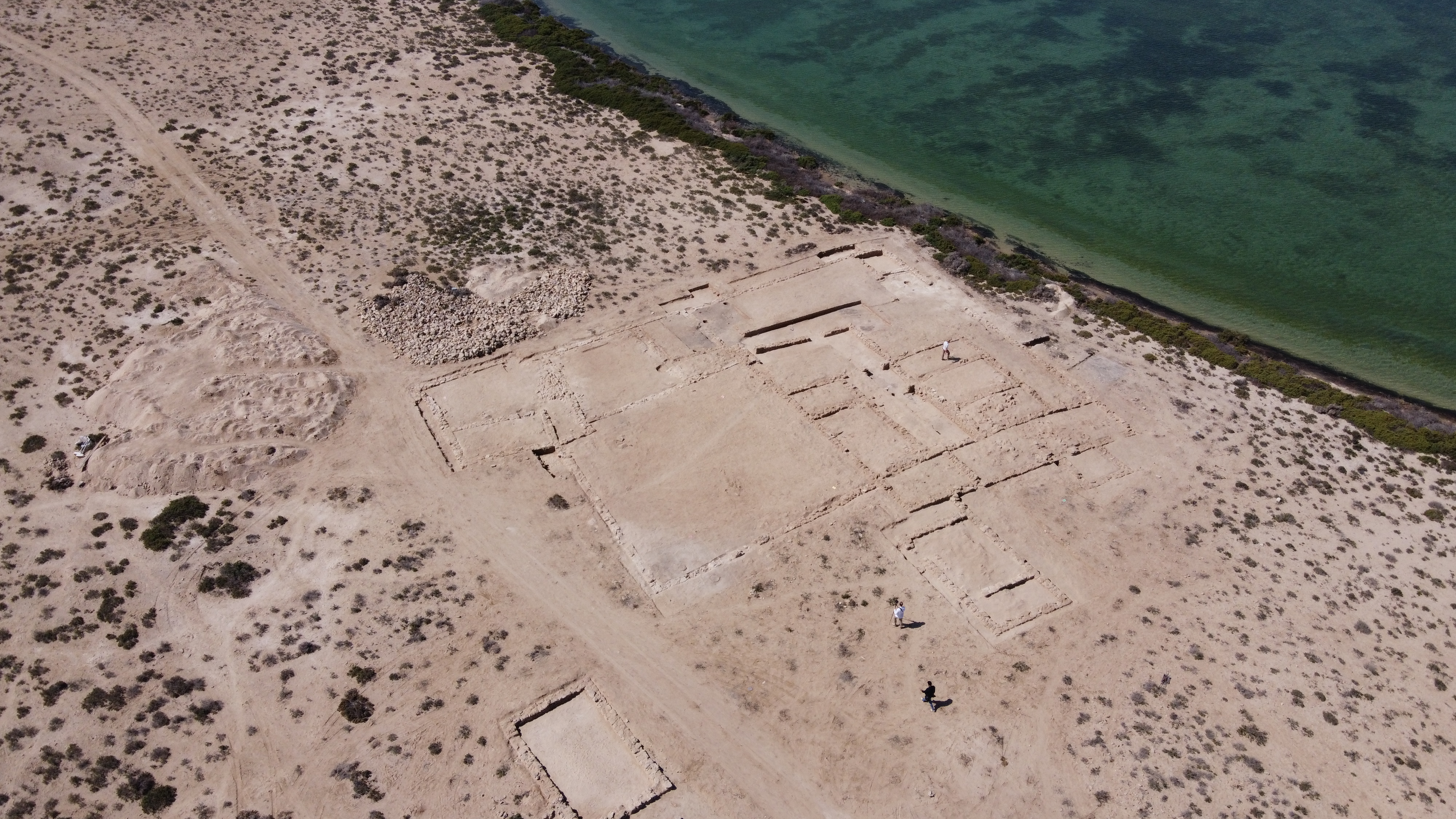
Social stratification at Siniyah is demonstrated by a number of large 'merchant's houses' together with a higher concentration of smaller, simpler houses. The town is close to a monastic complex.

Siniyah encloses the Khor Al Beida marshland and mangrove swamp off the coast of Umm Al Quwain. Archaeologists located the remains of the oldest known pearl fishing town in the Persian Gulf on the island, identifying a major settlement of some 12 hectares, comprising a number of houses built of rock and lime mortar. The site is thought to be one of the largest such settlements of its time, comparable to the city of Julfar in Ras Al Khaimah.

The nature of the houses, some larger and more complex than numerous smaller homes, suggests social stratification, and finds point to year-round settlement and a linkage to the nearby Christian monastery.

Finds at the site have included loose pearls and pearl divers' weights, used to accelerate their swim from the surface down to the pearl beds, as well as an extensive pearl shell midden thought to contain millions of shells.

The town has been dated to the late sixth or early seventh century CE both using radiocarbon and comparative dating techniques on pottery sherds. The town was likely Christian, predating the rise of Islam. It maintained extensive global trading links, with finds of ceramics, in particular, yielding an unusually high proportion of Indian ware. The nearby settlements at Ed Dur and Tell Abraq have also yielded a number of finds that point to extensive regional and global trading links over the past 5,000 years.

== Monastery ==
The monastery at Siniyah is the second such found in the UAE following the discovery of a monastery on Abu Dhabi’s Sir Bani Yas Island. It is one of six such monasteries so far identified on the coastal Persian Gulf and has been dated between 534 and 656 CE. The Siniyah monastic complex included a kitchen, storerooms, a water cistern and an oven, thought to have been used to bake communion wafers. A large house forms part of the complex and has been dubbed a 'Bishop's Palace'. Finds at the site include an altar and a nearby cistern thought to have been used for baptisms. Large glass chalices found at the site are thought to have been used to celebrate the Eucharist.

Parallels have been drawn between the monks of the region and their practices and those of sixth century monastic communities of Iona in Scotland. Over time, the Christian community waned at Siniyah as the influence of Islam grew across the Arabian Peninsula.

== Future development ==
The government of Umm Al Quwain has announced a Dh2.47 billion development project which will add major infrastructure, including leisure, hotel and residential properties to the island, which is currently uninhabited. The project includes the construction of a two-way three-land bridge between the mainland and the island, which is an environmentally as well as archaeologically important site, being home to one of the largest remaining colonies of Socotra cormorants in the world.
