= Qatrayith =

Extinct language from Eastern Arabia

Qaṭrāyīth
- Native to: Beth Qatraye
- Region: Eastern Arabia
- Ethnicity: Syriac Christians
- Era: 4th to 10th centuries AD
- Language family: Afro-Asiatic: Semitic; West Semitic; Central Semitic; Northwest Semitic; Aramaic; Eastern Aramaic; Qaṭrāyīth
- Writing system: Syriac

Language codes
- ISO 639-3: None (mis)
- Glottolog: None

Qaṭrāyīth is an extinct Semitic language and one of the languages of pre-Islamic Arabia, primarily spoken in Eastern Arabia until early Islamic times. The name, Qatrayith, comes from Syriac authors, literally meaning "in Qatari". Qatrayith was the local, vernacular language spoken by the Syriac Christians who lived in Beth Qatraye (a region covering large swathes of Eastern Arabia) from the 4th to 10th centuries AD. These Syriac populations did not use Qatrayith for writing; instead, this was carried out in the Syriac language, and Qatrayith would have been written down in the Syriac alphabet.

Qatrayith is poorly attested, with only about fifty words known from its lexicon thus far, mainly found in two Syriac commentaries: the Diyarbakir Commentary (8th century) and the East Syriac Anonymous Commentary (9th century). Both commentaries could have originated in Beth Qatraye, suggesting an intellectually sophisticated Syriac school of exegesis existed was present in the region, comparable to the School of Nisibis. The commentaries, written in Syriac themselves, sometimes gloss words with the Qatrayith vernacular, offering linguists their source of words from the language.

It is contested whether Qatrayith was a variety of Arabic, Aramaic, or its own language. Mario Kozah considered it a dialect of Arabic, but this has been disputed by Ahmad Al-Jallad, who considers it a distinct language.

According to Al-Jallad, the origins of the known Qatrayith vocabulary is as follows:

- 32% of words have general Semitic roots
- 18% of words clearly correspond to Arabic words
- 5% of words have less clear, cognate partners in Arabic
- 14% are from Aramaic, especially Syriac terms, including ones found in the Peshitta
- 14% are from Persian
- 5% are from Akkadian
- 12% have unknown origins

The vast diversity of the etymological origins of the Qatrayith vocabulary indicates that East Arabia was a cultural melting pot.

Qatrayith was first systematically studied by Anthon Shall in 1989, followed by Riccardo Contini in 2003. In recent years, most of the work on the language has been done by Mario Kozah, with some contributions by other scholars, like Ahmad Al-Jallad.

== See also ==
- Christianity in Eastern Arabia
- Dumaitic
- Languages of pre-Islamic Arabia
- History of Mar Yawnan
