= Mount Izla =

Mountain in Turkey

Coordinates: 37°20′00″N 41°10′00″E

Mt. Izla in Turkey

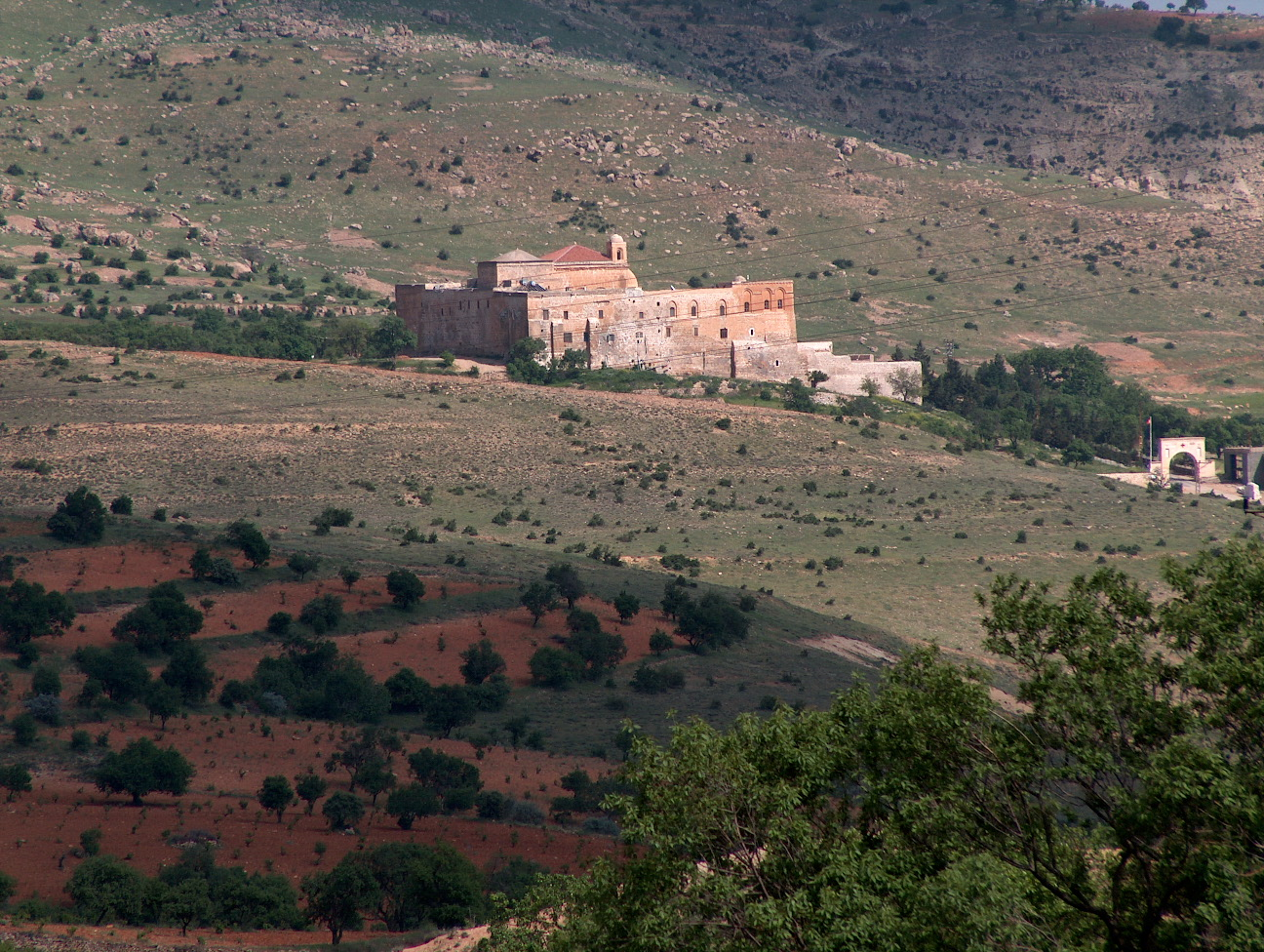
The Saffron Monastery, Mor Hananyo, one of the many monasteries on Mt. Izla

Mount Izla (Syriac: ܛܘܪ ܐܝܙܠܐ Ṭūr Īzlā' ), also Mountain of Nisibis or briefly in the 9th century Mount Kashyari, is a low mountain or ridge near Nisibis in what once a part of Assyria, then Sassanid Persian province of Asoristan, but is now southeastern Turkey, along the border with Syria. The ridge is the location of dozens of ancient monasteries which were built by the Assyrian Church of the East and Syriac Orthodox Church in the early centuries of Eastern Rite Christianity. In modern times, all of the monasteries are in ruins except for that of Mar Melke reconsecrated in the 1930s, Mor Yakub Monastery, founded in Dibek in 2012–2013, and the Monastery of Mor Augin which was refounded in 2008 after being abandoned in the 70's.

== Geography ==
Though called a mountain, it is actually a 77-kilometre-long (48 mi) ridge running from east to west, with a plateau on the northern (Turkey) side, and a plain on the southern (Syria) side. One end of the ridge is Dara, a Roman fortification. On the other is Sisauranon (Sīrwān), the location of the Castle of Tur Abdin, as well as a monastery which was built by Theodosius II in the 5th century.

== History ==
Early monasteries, believed to have been founded in the 4th century, are Mar Awgin, Mar Malke, and Mar Samuel. The next was the most famous, Mar Abraham of Kashkar, also known as the Great Monastery, which was founded in the latter part of the 6th century by the Assyrian Church of the East. Later monasteries included that of Rabban Sapra, Mar Yaret, Mar Khudahwi, Za'faran (Saffron), Mar Yohannan, and Mar Ya'qob. At its peak, there were approximately 40,000 Christian monks which resided on Mt. Izla.

== Notable residents ==
- Abraham the Great of Kashkar
- Dadisho of Mount Izla
- Babai the Great
