= Dadisho Qatraya =

7th-century Arabian Christian monk

Dadisho Qatraya or Dadisho of Qatar (Classical Syriac: ܕܕܝܫܘܥ ܩܛܪܝܐ; late 7th century) was a Nestorian monk and author of ascetic literature in Syriac. His works were widely read, from Ethiopia to Central Asia.

== Life ==
Dadisho flourished in the late 7th century. Originally from Beth Qatraye (eastern Arabia), he became attached first to the unidentified monastery of Rab-kennārē then later to those of Rabban Shabur (near Shushtar in Khuzestan) and of the Blessed Apostles. Nothing else about his life is known. Giuseppe Simone Assemani identified him with Dadisho of Mount Izla, who lived a century earlier. Addai Scher, however, demonstrated that there were two distinct individuals.

== Works ==
He wrote extensively in Syriac. All of his writings are concerned with shelya (stillness). Among his surviving works are:

- Treatise on Solitude, also called the Retreat of the Seven Weeks or the Seven Weeks of Solitude, which describes how a monk should retreat into complete solitude and prayer for seven weeks at a time
- Letter to Mar Abkosh on Hesychia, also called On Stillness (i.e., hesychia)
- Commentary on Abba Isaiah, which is a commentary on the Syriac version of the Asceticon of Isaiah of Scetis and describes shelya as the condition the soul must meet to reach God. All surviving manuscripts break off after the fifteenth discourse of Isaiah (out of twenty-six), but there are quotations from the rest of the work in a fragmentary commentary on Isaiah that was apparently a reworking of Dadisho's.
- Commentary on the Paradise of the Fathers, which is a commentary on the Paradise of the Fathers of Enanisho in the form of a series of questions posed by some monks to their superior concerning the issues raised by the sayings of the Egyptian Fathers collected by Enanisho

He also wrote a few short work on similar ascetic themes. Both of his commentaries were translated into Arabic and Sogdian. Although only fragments of the latter survive, the Arabic version survives both complete and abridged and in both Arabic script and Garshuni. The Commentary on the Paradise was also translated from Arabic into Ethiopic. The Arabic version of the Abba Isaiah commentary describes Dadisho as a disciple of Isaac of Nineveh. These translations assured him a wide diffusion among the Oriental Orthodox. Dadisho is the earliest writer to credit an Egyptian monk, Mar Awgin (a figure he may have invented), with introducing monasticism to Mesopotamia in the 4th century.

== Bibliography ==
- Albert, Micheline (2005) [2002]. "Dadisho Qatraya". In André Vauchez (ed.). Encyclopedia of the Middle Ages. Oxford University Press [James Clarke & Co.] ISBN 9780227679319.
- Brock, Sebastian P. (1999). "Syriac Writers from Beth Qaṭraye". ARAM Periodical. 11 (1): 85–96. doi:10.2143/aram.11.1.504452.
- Brock, Sebastian P. (2018) [2011]. "Dadishoʿ Qaṭraya". In Sebastian P. Brock; Aaron M. Butts; George A. Kiraz; Lucas Van Rompay (eds.). Gorgias Encyclopedic Dictionary of the Syriac Heritage: Electronic Edition. Beth Mardutho [Gorgias Press].
- Mingana, Alphonse (2012) [1934]. Early Christian Mystics. Gorgias Press.
- Kitchen, Robert (2018). "Dadīshōʿ Qatrāya". In Nicholson, Oliver (ed.). The Oxford Dictionary of Late Antiquity, Volume 1: A–I. Oxford: Oxford University Press. p. 449. ISBN 978-0-19-881624-9.
- Kozah, Mario (2019). "Introduction". In Mario Kozah; Abdulrahim Abu-Husayn; Suleiman Mourad (eds.). Dadishoʿ Qaṭraya's Compendious Commentary on The Paradise of the Egyptian Fathers. Gorgias Press.
- Scher, Addai (1906). "Notice sur la vie et les oeuvres de Dadîšôʿ Qaṭrāya". Journal asiatique. 10th ser. (7): 103–111.
- Sims-Williams, Nicholas (1993). "Dādišoʿ Qaṭrāyā". Encyclopaedia Iranica.
- Sims-Williams, Nicholas (1994). "Dādišoʿ Qaṭrāyā's Commentary on the Paradise of the Fathers". Analecta Bollandiana. 112 (1): 33–64. doi:10.1484/j.abol.4.01639.
- Wilmshurst, David (2011). The Martyred Church: A History of the Church of the East. East and West Publishing.
