= Gabriel of Qatar =

Qatari writer

Gabriel of Qatar, also known as Gabriel Qaṭraya bar Lipeh, was a Qatari Syriac writer of the Church of the East. He wrote a commentary on the East Syrian liturgy.

== Life ==
Gabriel's date are uncertain, but he probably flourished in the late 6th and early 7th centuries. He refers to Shubḥalmaran, metropolitan bishop of Karka d-Beth Slokh, who probably died in or about 620, as still alive. His commentary must precede the reforms of the liturgy associated with the patriarchate of Ishoʿyahb III (649–659).

Sarhad Yawsip Jammo identified the author of the commentary with the Gabriel Qaṭraya who collated a manuscript of the Peshitta (Syriac Bible) at Nisibis in the 25th year of Khusrau II (either 614 or 615). There are references in this manuscript to the School of Nisibis and it was probably copied there. A notice says that Gabriel worked in the presence of his teacher, Mar Zakka, which implies that he was a young student at the time. Sebastian Brock rejected the identification. The manuscript is currently British Library, Add. 14471.

== Work ==
Gabriel's commentary, sometimes known under the Latin title Interpretatio officiorum, survives in a single manuscript copied in the Monastery of the Bear, now catalogued as British Library, Or. 3336. Only the section on the Holy Qurbana has been published and translated into English. An epitome of the Commentary by Abraham bar Lipeh has been published. The date on the manuscript is partially damaged. It was copied on the last Friday of July in a year of the 13th century, either 1238, 1268 or 1288.

The commentary is divided into five verse homilies (memre) in question-and-answer format. The first homily concerns ramšā (vespers) on weekdays and contains fifteen questions; the second concerns ṣaprā (prime) on weekdays in seventeen questions; the third ramšā and lelyā (matins) on Sundays in five questions; the fourth ṣaprā on Sundays in nine questions; and the fifth the Holy Qurbana, which is the Eucharist, in eight questions.

== Bibliography ==
- Brock, Sebastian P. (1999). "Syriac Writers from Beth Qaṭraye". ARAM Periodical. 11 (1): 85–96. doi:10.2143/aram.11.1.504452.
- Brock, Sebastian P. (2003). "Gabriel of Qatar's Commentary on the Liturgy". Hugoye. 6 (2): 197–248.
- Brock, Sebastian P. (2011). "Gabriel Qaṭraya". In Sebastian P. Brock; Aaron M. Butts; George A. Kiraz; Lucas Van Rompay (eds.). Gorgias Encyclopedic Dictionary of the Syriac Heritage. Gorgias Press.
- Kilmartin, Edward J. (1981). "John Chrysostom's Influence on Gabriel Qatraya's Theology of Eucharistic Consecration". Theological Studies. 42 (3): 444–457.
