= Giwargis I of Seleucia-Ctesiphon =

Giwargis I (Classical Syriac: ܓܝܘܪܓܝܣ ܩܕܡܝܐ) was patriarch of the Church of the East from 661 to 680.

== Sources ==
Brief accounts of Giwargis's patriarchate are given in the Ecclesiastical Chronicle of the Jacobite writer Bar Hebraeus (floruit 1280) and in the ecclesiastical histories of the Nestorian writers Mari (twelfth-century), ʿAmr (fourteenth-century) and Sliba (fourteenth-century); also, in veiled and biased form, John bar Penkaye (fl. late 680s).

A fuller account of the reign of Giwargis, describing in detail his quarrel with the metropolitan Giwargis of Nisibis, who opposed his election, is given by Thomas of Marga in his Book of Governors. Thomas drew on a lost ecclesiastical history of the Church of the East written by Athqen, a monk of the monastery of Mar Abraham on Mount Izla.

Giwargis held a synod at Dairin in Beth Qatraye in 676 to reconcile the bishops of Beth Qatraye with the metropolitan of Fars. The acts of this synod have survived, and their Syriac text was published with a French translation in J. B. Chabot's Synodicon Orientale (Paris, 1902).

== Giwargis's patriarchate ==
The following account of Giwargis's patriarchate is given by Bar Hebraeus:

At that time there died Ishoʿyahb III, the catholicus of the Nestorians, who was succeeded at Seleucia by his disciple Giwargis. He made a tour of the regions, anxious to restore ecclesiastical matters, while his enemies accused him to the emir of the Arabs of touring the regions to collect money. The emir therefore demanded money from him, and when he refused to give it, and did not give it even after suffering torture and imprisonment, the indignant emir destroyed many churches at ʿAqula and throughout the region of Hirta. In the time of Giwargis the doctor Yohannan, bishop of Beth Waziq, cut off his members after he was accused of fornication, and was then condemned all the more and deposed.

Also of his time, John bar Penkaye wrote:

"This period of calm was to us the cause of so much weakness, that there happened to us what happened to the Israelites, of whom it is said: "Israel has grown fat and lazy, he has become fat and wealthy, he has abandoned the God who made him, and despised the strong one that saved him." The westerners, it is true, clung tightly to their sacrilegious (faith), but we who believe we adhere to the true faith, we were so far from the works of Christians, that if one of the former had risen and had seen us, he would have had been dizzy and said: "this is not the faith in which I died.""

Bar Penkaye specifically hits "the leaders" under Muawiyah - which can only be Giwargis - for arrogance, for greed, for gluttony, for involvement in politics, and for bribing the secular authorities (also applicable to Ishoyahb III).

== Signatories ==
Name	Province	Modern Location
Gīwargīs	Patriarchate of Salīq-Qṭēspōn (Seleucia-Ctesiphon)	Al-Mada'in
T'ōmā	Metropolitan of Bēṯ Qaṭrāyē	Qatar
Īšo'yaḇ	Bishop of Dairīn	Tarout
Sargīs	Bishop of Ṭīrhān	Tikrit
Isṭapānōs	Bishop of Bēṯ Mazunāyē	Oman
Pusai	Bishop of Haggar	Al Hajar Mountains
Šāhīn	Bishop of Ḥattā	Hatta

== See also ==
- List of patriarchs of the Church of the East

Church of the East titles
Preceded by Ishoʿyahb III (649–659)	Catholicos-Patriarch of the East (661–680)	Succeeded by Yohannan I (680–683)
