= Sir Bani Yas =

Island in United Arab Emirates

Seer Bani Yas
Native name: Arabic: صِـيـر بَـنِى يَـاس
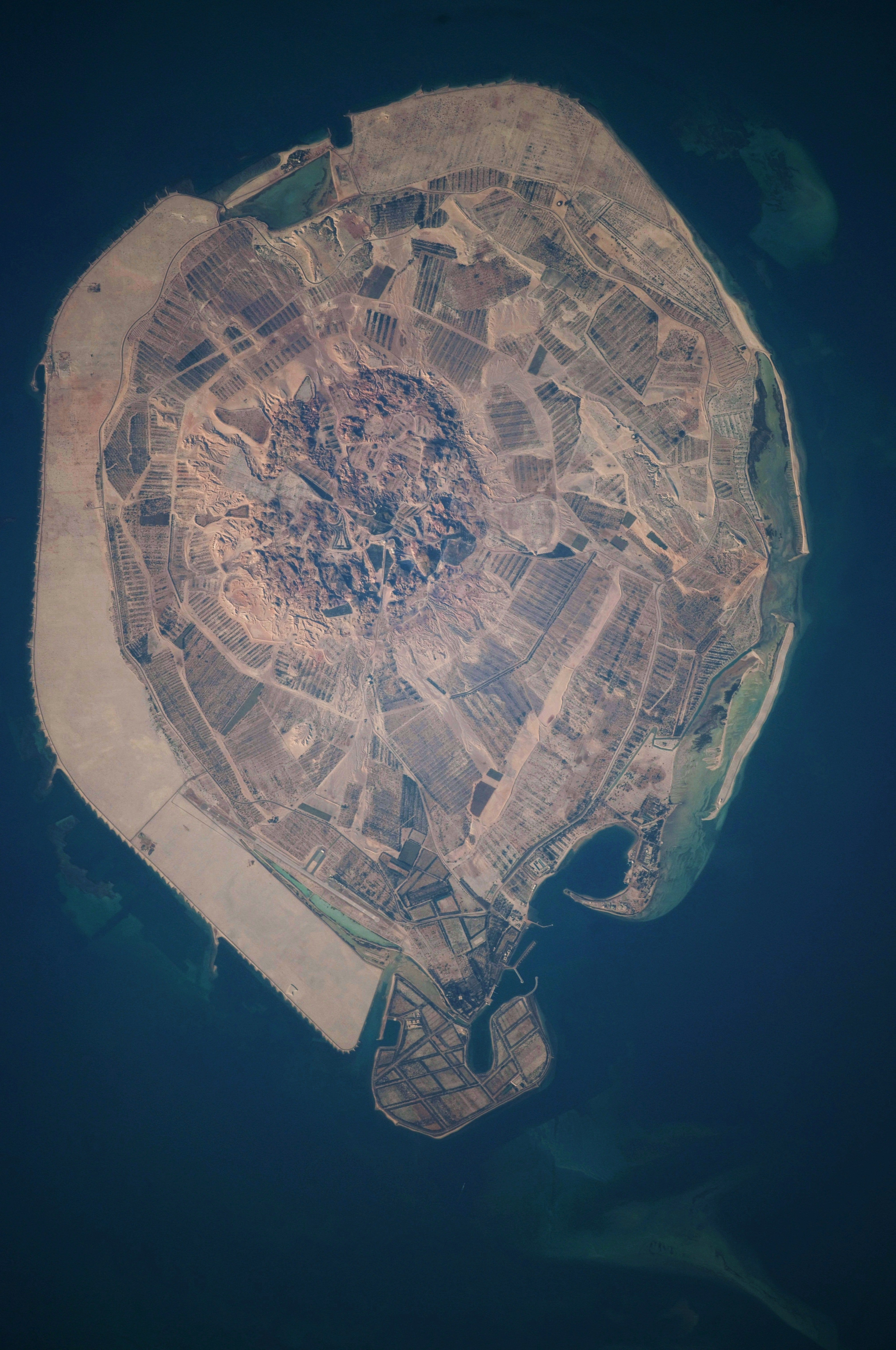
- This astronaut photograph illustrates the varying character of surfaces on Sir Bani Yas

- Location within United Arab Emirates

Geography
- Location: Persian Gulf
- Coordinates: 24°20′N 52°36′E
- Area: 87 km^{2} (34 sq mi)
- Length: 17.5 km (10.87 mi)
- Width: 9 km (5.6 mi)

Administration
- United Arab Emirates
- Emirate: Abu Dhabi

Demographics
- Ethnic groups: Arabs

Sir Bani Yas (Arabic: صِير بَنِي يَاس, romanized: Ṣīr Banī Yās) is a natural island located 170 km (110 mi) southwest of Abu Dhabi, the capital of the United Arab Emirates. It lies 9 km (5.6 mi) offshore from Jebel Dhanna, which serves as a crossing point to other islands, such as Dalma. Sir Bani Yas is 17.5 km (10.9 mi) from north to south and 9 km (5.6 mi) from east to west, making it the largest natural island in the United Arab Emirates. Located just off the shore of the western region of Abu Dhabi, Sir Bani Yas is home to a wildlife reserve that was once Arabia's largest. Spanning over 87 km^{2} (34 mi^{2}), the reserve was established in 1977 by Sheikh Zayed Bin Sultan Al Nahyan. Due to decades of conservation work and ecological investment, it is now home to thousands of large free-roaming animals and several million trees and plants. A bird sanctuary as well as a wildlife reserve, Sir Bani Yas showcases nature through activities such as adventure safaris, kayaking, mountain biking, archery, hiking and snorkeling.

== History ==
The name Sir Bani Yas originates from the Bani Yas tribe, who first inhabited Abu Dhabi. Sir Bani Yas is the crest of a salt dome created millions of years ago by natural geological forces.

The first human settlers arrived several thousand years ago. Thirty-six archaeological sites have been discovered throughout Sir Bani Yas, each providing a distinct insight into the island's history. A Bronze Age (c. 1800 BC) Dilmun trading port was excavated with finds including a Dilmun stamp seal and Harappan sherds. One of the oldest sites is the remains of an Eastern Christian monastery which dates back to 600 AD, which is now carefully covered for conservation and preservation.

The island has a number of significant historical sites, including remnants of Late Stone Age and early Islamic structures. The island is also the location of the first pre-Islamic Christian site to be found in the UAE. The 7th-century Christian church was opened to the public in mid-December 2010. It was discovered in 1992 and has been the focus of archaeological investigation under a team led by Dr. Joseph Elders. Dr. Elders claims the church was used by Nestorian Christians until about 750 AD. Further excavations in 2014 revealed additional structures, including dormitories, a kitchen, cells, and burial sites. Archaeological evidence suggests that the monastic community engaged in cattle farming, fishing, and trade with Muslim neighbors in the Gulf region. The Christian complex operated for approximately 150 years after the advent of Islam in the region, but appears to have gradually faded away rather than being destroyed.

Sir Bani Yas was first mentioned in European literature around 1590, when the Venetian jeweler Gasparo Balbi listed "Sirbeniast" as an island around which pearls were often found. It was also described in some detail during the 1820s and 1850s by British naval officers who were surveying the lower Gulf waters.

In 1971 Sheikh Zayed became the first president of the United Arab Emirates, and chose this island as a retreat. In 1977, he passed a law prohibiting hunting on the island and started developing it as a wildlife preserve in his "Greening of the Desert" program, which was designed to help make the deserts more suitable for human settlement and provide a haven for many of Arabia's endangered wildlife species. The island is home to the Arabian Wildlife Park, which spans approximately 1,400 hectares (around 14 square kilometers) and hosts over 17,000 free-roaming animals. Several millions trees were planted and numerous animals species introduced to the island, including gazelle, oryx, llama, hyrax, giraffe, and ostrich. Once the reserve was established, Sheikh Zayed wanted to share the results with the world; hence it was opened to weekend tourists. These tours soon became so popular that visits would often have to be booked over one year in advance.

In 2007, the Government of Abu Dhabi established the Desert Islands. This brought together Sir Bani Yas, neighboring Dalma Island, and six surrounding sandy outcrops into one destination. Sir Bani Yas and Dalma Islands are developed and can be visited, but the 6 discovery islands are currently closed to the public.

== Wildlife and nature ==
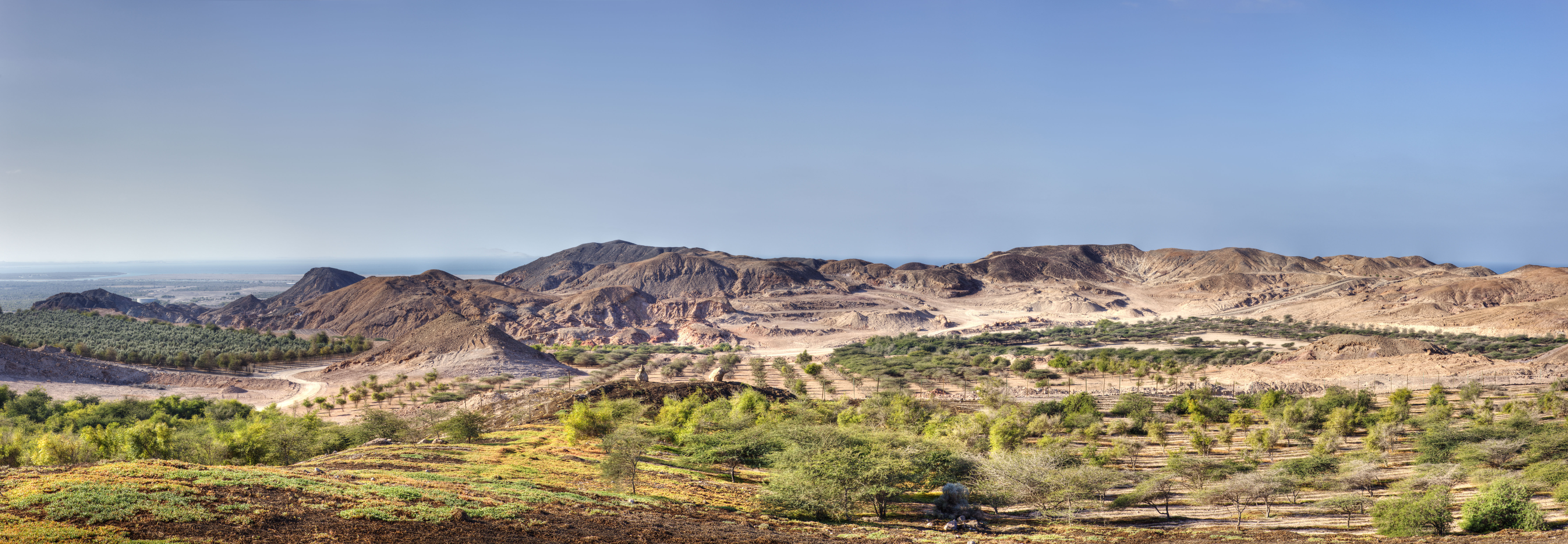
Sir Bani Yas

The island is home to many species, from Arabian oryx, Somali ostrich, gazelle and deer to reticulated giraffes, dolphins and sea turtles. Many of the more than 100 species of wild birds which can be found on the island are indigenous to the region. The island is home to around 30 species of mammals, including a variety of antelope and one of the world's largest herd of endangered Arabian oryx. The Arabian oryx, a species of antelope, was formerly extinct in the wild, but the island is home to a herd of over 400 who roam freely on the island.

Spanning about half of Sir Bani Yas, the Arabian Wildlife Park provides an environment for wild animals to freely roam while the island remains open for visitors. The park houses some 13,000 animals indigenous to the Arabian Peninsula including the endangered Arabian oryx, sand gazelle and mountain gazelle as well as free-roaming predators and scavengers such as the cheetah and striped hyena.

While research and conservation efforts are a major part of the park's current development, a number of wildlife and adventure activities are already available for visitors. These include game drives, nature trails, mountain biking, and outdoor dining.

Sir Bani Yas is home to many animals that the International Union for Conservation of Nature classifies as critically endangered or vulnerable, including sea turtles, sand gazelles, Barbary sheep, Arabian tahr and oryx. Therefore, the island plays a significant role in protecting these animals for future generations. More than 10,000 animals from Sir Bani Yas have been released into wildlife reserves such as the one in the Liwa Desert, on the Abu Dhabi mainland. This program has been carried out in conjunction with the Environment Agency Abu Dhabi.

=== Important Bird Area ===
The small islands near Sir Bani Yas have been designated an Important Bird Area (IBA) by BirdLife International because they support breeding populations of Socotra cormorants, Saunders's terns and white-cheeked terns.

== Hospitality ==
The island hosts three luxury hotels, all operated by Thai hospitality company Minor Hotels: the Desert Islands Resort & Spa by Anantara in the northwest, the Anantara Sir Bani Yas Island Al Sahel Villa Resort in the west, and the Anantara Sir Bani Yas Island Al Yamm Villa Resort in the east. The first resort opened in 2008 and has 64 rooms, while the second and third resort both opened in 2013 and have 30 villas each.

Visitors can park their cars in the dedicated parking at the arrival centre. The island can be reached by complimentary water taxi from the jetty at Jebel Dhanna. The journey takes approximately 30 minutes, with four scheduled crossings a day. The properties are a 15 minute drive from each other with complimentary guest transfers between the resorts.

MODON is the real estate development and investment company of the three Anantara resorts on Sir Bani Yas Island.

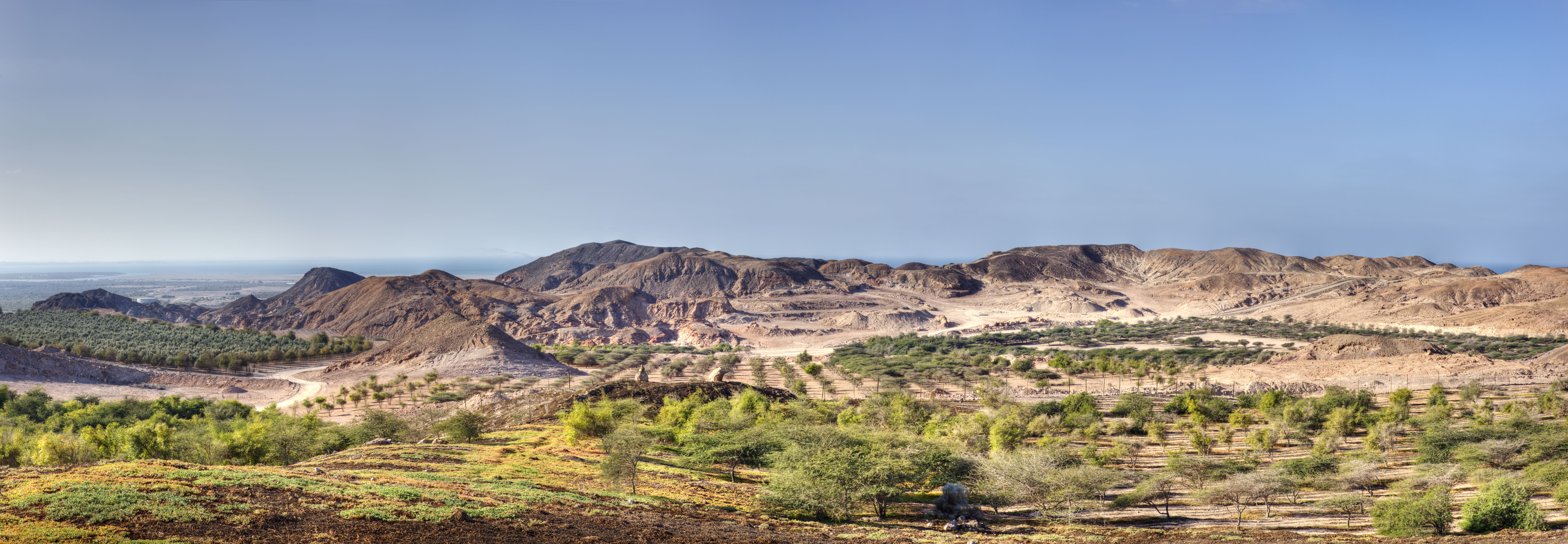
Sir Bani Yas Island Panorama

Celestyal Cruises, MSC Cruises and TUI Cruises, use a small section of the island as a private island destination on week-long cruises. The section contains beaches and several bar and buffet areas.

== Sustainability ==
The island is being developed with respect to its nature and delicate ecosystem. The island operates the region's first wind turbine, which has a production capacity of 850 kilowatts, currently producing energy to power the island's facilities alongside conventional supply from the national grid. The island also uses solar energy to power part of the staff accommodation which is not currently connected to the electricity grid.

The Abu Dhabi-based renewable energy company Masdar has declared plans to raise wind production capacity to 30 megawatts.

== Transportation ==
Guest staying at the three resorts on Sir Bani Yas Island can take the water taxi from the jetty at Jebel Dhanna.

== See also ==
- Eastern Arabia
- Wildlife of the United Arab Emirates
- Private island
