= Deh-e Molla =

Deh-e Molla or Deh Molla (Persian: ده ملا) may refer to:

- Deh-e Molla, Kerman
- Deh-e Molla Bozorg, Khuzestan Province
- Deh-e Molla Kuchek, Khuzestan Province
- Deh-e Molla, Markazi
- Deh Molla, Markazi
- Deh Molla, Razavi Khorasan
- Deh-e Molla, Semnan
- Deh Molla, Sistan and Baluchestan
- Deh-e Molla Rural District, in Semnan Province
