= Cham Morad =

Cham Morad چم مراد
- Village
- Location within Iran
- Coordinates: 30°16′10″N 49°44′41″E
- Country: Iran
- Province: Khuzestan
- County: Hendijan
- Bakhsh: Central
- Rural District: Hendijan-e Sharqi

Population (2006)
  - Total: 338
- Time zone: UTC+3:30 (IRST)
  - Summer (DST): UTC+4:30 (IRDT)

Cham Morad (Persian: چم مراد, also Romanized as Cham Morād) is a village in Hendijan-e Sharqi Rural District, in the Central District of Hendijan County, Khuzestan Province, Iran. At the 2006 census, its population was 338, in 65 families.
