= Khassafiat =

Khassafiat خصافيات
- Village
- Location within Iran
- Coordinates: 30°34′13″N 49°30′04″E
- Country: Iran
- Province: Khuzestan
- County: Hendijan
- Bakhsh: Cham Khalaf-e Isa
- Rural District: Soviren

Population (2006)
  - Total: 18
- Time zone: UTC+3:30 (IRST)
  - Summer (DST): UTC+4:30 (IRDT)

Khassafiat (Persian: خصافيات, also Romanized as Khaşşāfīāt and Khaşşā Feyāt; also known as Khashāfīāt and Shāhzādeh Ḩamzeh) is a village in Soviren Rural District, Cham Khalaf-e Isa District, Hendijan County, Khuzestan Province, Iran. At the 2006 census, its population was 18, in 4 families.
