= Shiri, Khuzestan =

Shiri شيري
- Village
- Location within Iran
- Coordinates: 30°34′08″N 49°45′51″E
- Country: Iran
- Province: Khuzestan
- County: Hendijan
- Bakhsh: Cham Khalaf-e Isa
- Rural District: Soviren

Population (2006)
  - Total: 225
- Time zone: UTC+3:30 (IRST)
  - Summer (DST): UTC+4:30 (IRDT)

Shiri (Persian: شيري, also Romanized as Shīrī) is a village in Soviren Rural District, Cham Khalaf-e Isa District, Hendijan County, Khuzestan Province, Iran. At the 2006 census, its population was 225, in 40 families.
