= Bu Taheri =

Bu Taheri بوطاهري
- Village
- Location within Iran
- Coordinates: 30°14′33″N 49°59′40″E
- Country: Iran
- Province: Khuzestan
- County: Hendijan
- Bakhsh: Central
- Rural District: Hendijan-e Sharqi

Population (2006)
  - Total: 64
- Time zone: UTC+3:30 (IRST)
  - Summer (DST): UTC+4:30 (IRDT)

Bu Taheri (Persian: بوطاهري, also Romanized as Bū Ţāherī; also known as Butari) is a village in Hendijan-e Sharqi Rural District, in the Central District of Hendijan County, Khuzestan Province, Iran. At the 2006 census, its population was 64, in 14 families.
