= Cham Kalgeh =

Cham Kalgeh چم كلگه
- Village
- Location within Iran
- Coordinates: 30°22′44″N 49°43′47″E
- Country: Iran
- Province: Khuzestan
- County: Hendijan
- Bakhsh: Central
- Rural District: Hendijan-e Gharbi

Population (2006)
  - Total: 402
- Time zone: UTC+3:30 (IRST)
  - Summer (DST): UTC+4:30 (IRDT)

Cham Kalgeh (Persian: چم كلگه) is a village in Hendijan-e Gharbi Rural District, in the Central District of Hendijan County, Khuzestan Province, Iran. At the 2006 census, its population was 402, in 89 families.
