= Safaiyeh (disambiguation) =

Safaiyeh is an alternate name of Kahriz Sang, a city in Isfahan province, Iran

Safaiyeh or Safayyeh (Persian: صفائيه) may also refer to various places in Iran:

- Safaiyeh, alternate name of Tolombeh-ye Safaiyeh, Anar, Kerman province
- Safaiyeh, Kermanshah
- Safaiyeh, Ravansar, Kermanshah province
- Safaiyeh, Khuzestan
- Safaiyeh Rural District, in Razavi Khorasan province
- Safayyeh, city in Rafsanjan County, Kerman province
- Safayyeh Rural District, in Isfahan province
