= Ghuleh-ye Olya =

Ghuleh-ye Olya غوله عليا
- Village
- Location within Iran
- Coordinates: 30°31′56″N 49°47′49″E
- Country: Iran
- Province: Khuzestan
- County: Hendijan
- Bakhsh: Cham Khalaf-e Isa
- Rural District: Soviren

Population (2006)
  - Total: 51
- Time zone: UTC+3:30 (IRST)
  - Summer (DST): UTC+4:30 (IRDT)

Ghuleh-ye Olya (Persian: غوله عليا, also Romanized as Ghūleh-ye ‘Olyā and Ghūleh ‘Olyā; also known as Ghūleh-ye Bālā) is a village in Soviren Rural District, Cham Khalaf-e Isa District, Hendijan County, Khuzestan Province, Iran. At the 2006 census, its population was 51, in 10 families.
