= Cham Rahman =

Cham Rahman چم رحمان
- Village
- Location within Iran
- Coordinates: 30°15′17″N 49°43′40″E
- Country: Iran
- Province: Khuzestan
- County: Hendijan
- Bakhsh: Central
- Rural District: Hendijan-e Sharqi

Population (2006)
  - Total: 75
- Time zone: UTC+3:30 (IRST)
  - Summer (DST): UTC+4:30 (IRDT)

Cham Rahman (Persian: چم رحمان, also Romanized as Cham Raḩmān; also known as Cham Rahmani) is a village in Hendijan-e Sharqi Rural District, in the Central District of Hendijan County, Khuzestan Province, Iran. At the 2006 census, its population was 75, in 15 families.
