= Bozi, Iran =

Bozi بزي
- Village
- Location within Iran
- Coordinates: 30°31′38″N 49°44′52″E
- Country: Iran
- Province: Khuzestan
- County: Hendijan
- Bakhsh: Cham Khalaf-e Isa
- Rural District: Soviren

Population (2006)
  - Total: 97
- Time zone: UTC+3:30 (IRST)
  - Summer (DST): UTC+4:30 (IRDT)

Bozi (Persian: بزي, also Romanized as Bozī) is a village in Soviren Rural District, Cham Khalaf-e Isa District, Hendijan County, Khuzestan Province, Iran. At the 2006 census, its population was 97, in 17 families.
