= Reg Sefid =

Coordinates: 30.2432°N 50.0496°E

Reg Sefid رگ سفيد
- Village
- Interactive map of Reg Sefid
- Country: Iran
- Province: Khuzestan
- County: Hendijan
- Bakhsh: Central
- Rural District: Hendijan-e Sharqi

Population (2006)
  - Total: 161
- Time zone: UTC+3:30 (IRST)
  - Summer (DST): UTC+4:30 (IRDT)

Reg Sefid (Persian: رگ سفيد, also Romanized as Reg Sefīd) is a village in Hendijan-e Sharqi Rural District, in the Central District of Hendijan County, Khuzestan Province, Iran. At the 2006 census, its population was 161, in 43 families.
