= Kareh Pa =

Kareh Pa كره پا
- Village
- Location within Iran
- Coordinates: 30°20′07″N 49°44′33″E
- Country: Iran
- Province: Khuzestan
- County: Hendijan
- Bakhsh: Central
- Rural District: Hendijan-e Sharqi

Population (2006)
  - Total: 227
- Time zone: UTC+3:30 (IRST)
  - Summer (DST): UTC+4:30 (IRDT)

Kareh Pa (Persian: كره پا, also Romanized as Kareh Pā, Koreh Pā, Korreh Pā, and Kurreh Pa; also known as Khowreh) is a village in Hendijan-e Sharqi Rural District, in the Central District of Hendijan County, Khuzestan Province, Iran. At the 2006 census, its population was 227, in 46 families.
