= Kut-e Mahna =

Kut-e Mahna كوت مهنا
- Village
- Location within Iran
- Coordinates: 30°31′41″N 49°42′49″E
- Country: Iran
- Province: Khuzestan
- County: Hendijan
- Bakhsh: Cham Khalaf-e Isa
- Rural District: Soviren

Population (2006)
  - Total: 137
- Time zone: UTC+3:30 (IRST)
  - Summer (DST): UTC+4:30 (IRDT)

Kut-e Mahna (Persian: كوت مهنا, also Romanized as Kūt-e Mahnā, Kut-e Mohannā, and Kūt Mohannā; also known as Kut) is a village in Soviren Rural District, Cham Khalaf-e Isa District, Hendijan County, Khuzestan Province, Iran. At the 2006 census, its population was 137, in 25 families.
