= Talageh-ye Sofla, Khuzestan =

Talageh-ye Sofla طلاگه سفلي
- Village
- Location within Iran
- Coordinates: 30°33′35″N 49°41′29″E
- Country: Iran
- Province: Khuzestan
- County: Hendijan
- Bakhsh: Cham Khalaf-e Isa
- Rural District: Soviren

Population (2006)
  - Total: 95
- Time zone: UTC+3:30 (IRST)
  - Summer (DST): UTC+4:30 (IRDT)

Talageh-ye Sofla (Persian: طلاگه سفلي, also Romanized as Ţalāgeh-ye Soflá) is a village in Soviren Rural District, Cham Khalaf-e Isa District, Hendijan County, Khuzestan Province, Iran. At the 2006 census, its population was 95, in 23 families.
