= Darihak =

Darihak دریهک
- Village
- Location within Iran
- Coordinates: 30°28′06″N 49°41′41″E
- Country: Iran
- Province: Khuzestan
- County: Hendijan
- Bakhsh: Cham Khalaf-e Isa
- Rural District: Cham Khalaf-e Isa

Population (2006)
  - Total: 428
- Time zone: UTC+3:30 (IRST)
  - Summer (DST): UTC+4:30 (IRDT)

Darihak (Persian: دریهک, also Romanized as Darīhak and Dereyḩak; also known as Darmaḩak and Duraihak) is a village in Cham Khalaf-e Isa Rural District, Cham Khalaf-e Isa District, Hendijan County, Khuzestan Province, Iran. At the time of the 2006 census, its population was 428, in 89 families.
