= Jabrabad, Khuzestan =

Jabrabad جبراباد
- Village
- Location within Iran
- Coordinates: 30°19′31″N 49°44′42″E
- Country: Iran
- Province: Khuzestan
- County: Hendijan
- Bakhsh: Central
- Rural District: Hendijan-e Gharbi

Population (2006)
  - Total: 170
- Time zone: UTC+3:30 (IRST)
  - Summer (DST): UTC+4:30 (IRDT)

Jabrabad (Persian: جبراباد, also Romanized as Jabrābād; also known as Mehdīābād) is a village in Hendijan-e Gharbi Rural District, in the Central District of Hendijan County, Khuzestan Province, Iran. At the 2006 census, its population was 170, in 33 families.
