= Cham Konar =

Cham Konar (Persian: چم كنار) may refer to:

- Cham Konar, Dezful
- Cham Konar, Hendijan
- Cham Konar, Shushtar
