= Cham Kharnub =

Cham Kharnub چم خرنوب
- Village
- Location within Iran
- Coordinates: 30°27′04″N 49°41′06″E
- Country: Iran
- Province: Khuzestan
- County: Hendijan
- Bakhsh: Cham Khalaf-e Isa
- Rural District: Cham Khalaf-e Isa

Population (2006)
  - Total: 38
- Time zone: UTC+3:30 (IRST)
  - Summer (DST): UTC+4:30 (IRDT)

Cham Kharnub (Persian: چم خرنوب, also Romanized as Cham Kharnūb and Cham-e Kharnūb; also known as Cham-e Kharkāb and Cham Karnub) is a village in Cham Khalaf-e Isa Rural District, Cham Khalaf-e Isa District, Hendijan County, Khuzestan Province, Iran. At the 2006 census, its population was 38, in 9 families.
