= Cham Tang =

Cham Tang or Cham-e Tang (Persian: چم تنگ) may refer to:

- Cham Tang, Bushehr
- Cham Tang, Khuzestan

== See also ==
- Cham Tangu
