= Sar Khareh =

Sar Khareh or Sarkhareh or Sarkharreh or Sar Khowrreh or Saarkurreh (Persian: سرخره) may refer to:

- Sar Khareh-ye Olya
- Sar Khareh-ye Sofla
