= Cham Tang, Khuzestan =

Cham Tang چم تنگ
- Village
- Location within Iran
- Coordinates: 30°22′51″N 49°44′06″E
- Country: Iran
- Province: Khuzestan
- County: Hendijan
- Bakhsh: Central
- Rural District: Hendijan-e Sharqi

Population (2006)
  - Total: 295
- Time zone: UTC+3:30 (IRST)
  - Summer (DST): UTC+4:30 (IRDT)

Cham Tang (Persian: چم تنگ) is a village in Hendijan-e Sharqi Rural District, in the Central District of Hendijan County, Khuzestan Province, Iran. At the 2006 census, its population was 295, in 60 families.
