= Karimabad, Hendijan =

Village in Khuzestan province, Iran

Karimabad Persian: كريم اباد
- Village
- Location within Iran
- Coordinates: 30°27′12″N 49°40′39″E
- Country: Iran
- Province: Khuzestan
- County: Hendijan
- District: Cham Khalaf-e Isa
- Rural District: Cham Khalaf-e Isa

Population (2016)
  - Total: 566
- Time zone: UTC+3:30 (IRST)

Karimabad (Persian: كريم اباد) (Note: Also romanized as Karīmābād) is a village in Cham Khalaf-e Isa Rural District of Cham Khalaf-e Isa District, Hendijan County, Khuzestan province, Iran.

== Demographics ==
=== Population ===
At the time of the 2006 National Census, the village's population was 562 in 96 households. The following census in 2011 counted 615 people in 141 households. The 2016 census measured the population of the village as 566 people in 151 households. It was the most populous village in its rural district.
