= Deh-e Molla Kuchek =

Deh-e Molla Kuchek ده ملاكوچك
- Village
- Location within Iran
- Coordinates: 30°29′47″N 49°40′28″E
- Country: Iran
- Province: Khuzestan
- County: Hendijan
- Bakhsh: Cham Khalaf-e Isa
- Rural District: Soviren

Population (2006)
  - Total: 56
- Time zone: UTC+3:30 (IRST)
  - Summer (DST): UTC+4:30 (IRDT)

Deh-e Molla Kuchek (Persian: ده ملاكوچك, also Romanized as Deh-e Mollā Kūchek and Deh Mollā Kūchek) is a village in Soviren Rural District, Cham Khalaf-e Isa District, Hendijan County, Khuzestan Province, Iran. At the 2006 census, its population was 56, in 13 families.
