= Emamzadeh Abdollah, Khuzestan =

Village in Khuzestan province, Iran

Emamzadeh Abdollah Persian: امامزاده عبداله
- Village
- Location within Iran
- Coordinates: 30°10′38″N 50°05′54″E
- Country: Iran
- Province: Khuzestan
- County: Hendijan
- District: Central
- Rural District: Hendijan-e Sharqi

Population (2016)
  - Total: 616
- Time zone: UTC+3:30 (IRST)

Emamzadeh Abdollah (Persian: امامزاده عبداله) (Note: Also romanized as Emamzadeh Abdallah and Emāmzādeh ʿAbdāllah) is a village in Hendijan-e Sharqi Rural District (Note: Formerly Hendijan Rural District) of the Central District of Hendijan County, Khuzestan province, Iran.

== Demographics ==
=== Population ===
At the time of the 2006 National Census, the village's population was 708 in 151 households. The following census in 2011 counted 655 people in 158 households. The 2016 census measured the population of the village as 616 people in 185 households. It was the most populous village in its rural district.
