= Hoseynabad, Hendijan =

Village in Khuzestan province, Iran

Hoseynabad Persian: حسين اباد
- Village
- Location within Iran
- Coordinates: 30°17′27″N 49°44′28″E
- Country: Iran
- Province: Khuzestan
- County: Hendijan
- District: Central
- Rural District: Hendijan-e Gharbi

Population (2016)
  - Total: 338
- Time zone: UTC+3:30 (IRST)

Hoseynabad (Persian: حسين اباد) (Note: Also romanized as Ḩoseynābād; also known as Husainābad) is a village in, and the capital of, Hendijan-e Gharbi Rural District of the Central District of Hendijan County, Khuzestan province, Iran.

== Demographics ==
=== Population ===
At the time of the 2006 National Census, the village's population was 393 in 79 households. The following census in 2011 counted 423 people in 98 households. The 2016 census measured the population of the village as 338 people in 89 households. It was the most populous village in its rural district.
