= Soveyreh =

Village in Khuzestan province, Iran

Soveyreh Persian: سويره
- Village
- Location within Iran
- Coordinates: 30°34′11″N 49°44′15″E
- Country: Iran
- Province: Khuzestan
- County: Hendijan
- District: Cham Khalaf-e Isa
- Rural District: Soviren

Population (2016)
  - Total: 719
- Time zone: UTC+3:30 (IRST)

Soveyreh (Persian: سويره) (Note: Also romanized as Seveyreh, Soueyreh, and Sovīreh; also known as Sovayre, Sūrīn, and Suvaireh) is a village in, and the capital of, Soviren Rural District of Cham Khalaf-e Isa District, Hendijan County, Khuzestan province, Iran.

== Demographics ==
=== Population ===
At the time of the 2006 National Census, the village's population was 818 in 139 households. The following census in 2011 counted 766 people in 186 households. The 2016 census measured the population of the village as 719 people in 201 households.
