= Sar Khareh-ye Sofla =

Sar Khareh-ye Sofla سرخره سفلي
- Village
- Location within Iran
- Coordinates: 30°24′52″N 49°43′11″E
- Country: Iran
- Province: Khuzestan
- County: Hendijan
- Bakhsh: Cham Khalaf-e Isa
- Rural District: Cham Khalaf-e Isa

Population (2006)
  - Total: 154
- Time zone: UTC+3:30 (IRST)
  - Summer (DST): UTC+4:30 (IRDT)

Sar Khareh-ye Sofla (Persian: سرخره سفلي, also Romanized as Sar Khareh-ye Soflá and Sarkharreh Soflá; also known as Sar Khowr, Sar Khowrreh, and Sarkhurreh) is a village in Cham Khalaf-e Isa Rural District, Cham Khalaf-e Isa District, Hendijan County, Khuzestan Province, Iran. At the 2006 census, its population was 154, in 27 families.
