= Chehel Mani, Khuzestan =

Village in Khuzestan province, Iran

Chehel Mani Persian: چهل مني
- Village
- Location within Iran
- Coordinates: 30°17′44″N 49°45′08″E
- Country: Iran
- Province: Khuzestan
- County: Hendijan
- District: Central
- Rural District: Hendijan-e Sharqi

Population (2016)
  - Total: 92
- Time zone: UTC+3:30 (IRST)

Chehel Mani (Persian: چهل مني) (Note: Also romanized as Chehel Manī; also known as Chehil Mani) is a village in, and the capital of, Hendijan-e Sharqi Rural District (Note: Formerly Hendijan Rural District) of the Central District of Hendijan County, Khuzestan province, Iran.

== Demographics ==
=== Population ===
At the time of the 2006 National Census, the village's population was 236 in 46 households. The following census in 2011 counted 106 people in 30 households. The 2016 census measured the population of the village as 92 people in 26 households.
