= Cham Khalaf-e Isa =

Cham Khalaf-e Isa (Persian: چم خلف‌عیسی) may refer to:

- Cham Khalaf-e Isa District
- Cham Khalaf-e Isa Rural District
