= Zohreh River =

River in southwestern Iran

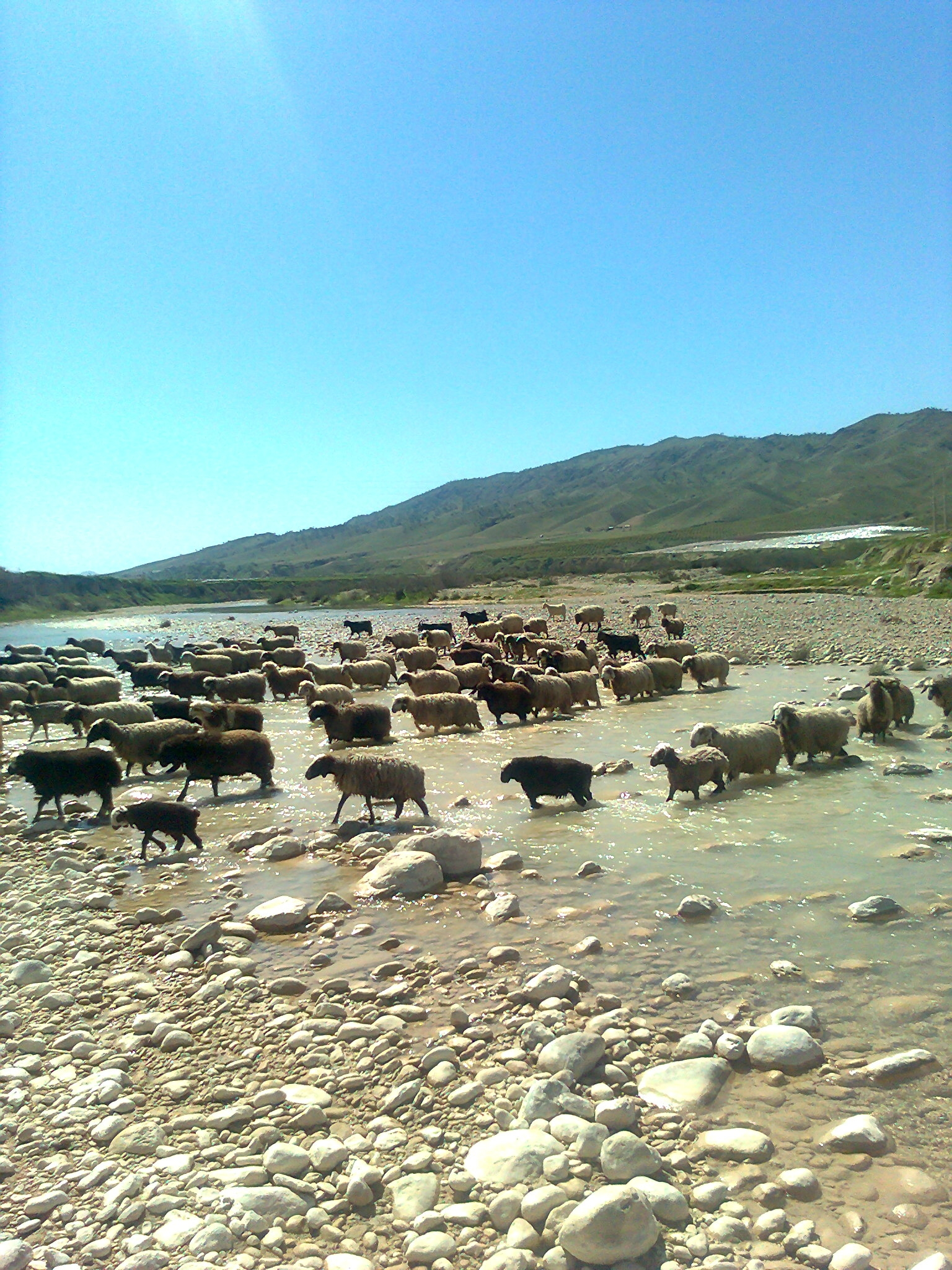
- Sheep crossing the Zohreh River

Location
- Country: Iran

Physical characteristics
- Source
  - location: Zagros
  - elevation: 2,450 m (8,040 ft)
- Mouth: Persian Gulf
  - coordinates: 30°4′1.1352″N 49°30′34.3584″E
- Length: Zohreh–Fahlian 490 km (300 mi)
- Basin size: 17,150 km^{2} (6,620 mi^{2})
- Discharge
  - location: Near mouth
  - average: (Period: 1971–2000)120.3 m^{3}/s (4,250 cu ft/s)

Basin features
- Progression: Persian Gulf
- River system: Zohreh River
- Tributaries
  - left: Fahlian
  - right: Tang Shiv, Kheyrabad

Catchment area of Zohreh River (in deep blue)

The Zohreh (Persian: رودخانه زهره, lit. 'Venus River') is a river in southwestern Iran. It is formed at the confluence of the rivers Rudkhaneye-Fekhlian (Fahlian), and Rude-Tenge-Shu (Tang Shiv), which flow from the southern slopes of the Zagros mountains northwest of the city of Nurabad, Fars to the south-west of Yasuj, in the Fars province. The stream rises at an altitude of approximately 2,450 m, and flows in the east–west direction for 490 km (300 mi).

It flows into the Persian Gulf of the Indian Ocean 25 km southwest of Hendijan, in the southeast of Khuzestan, where it forms the Hendijan Delta.

== Tributaries ==
Tributaries of the Zohreh are Fahlian, and Kheyrabad. The catchment area of the Zohreh is about 17,150 km^{2} (6,620 mi^{2}) of these 14,100 km^{2} (5,400 mi^{2}) is mountainous. The rest of the catchment consists of plains and mountainous foothills.

== Antiquity ==
In antiquity it was called Arosis (ancient Greek Ἄροσις, Latin Arosis, also Zarotis, Oratis, Oroatis). The river represented the border of the ancient territories of Parsa (Persides), and Susiana.

At the mouth of the river, the fleet of Nearchus (360–300 BC), an associate of Alexander the Great, stopped to rest and to take on water for five days to sail along the shores of Susiana.

The town of Alexandria Carmania was founded by Alexander in January 324 BC after his army had reunited with Nearchus and his men who had beached their boats near the mouth of the Minab River, further down along the south coast of Iran in Hormozgan province.

== Archaeology ==
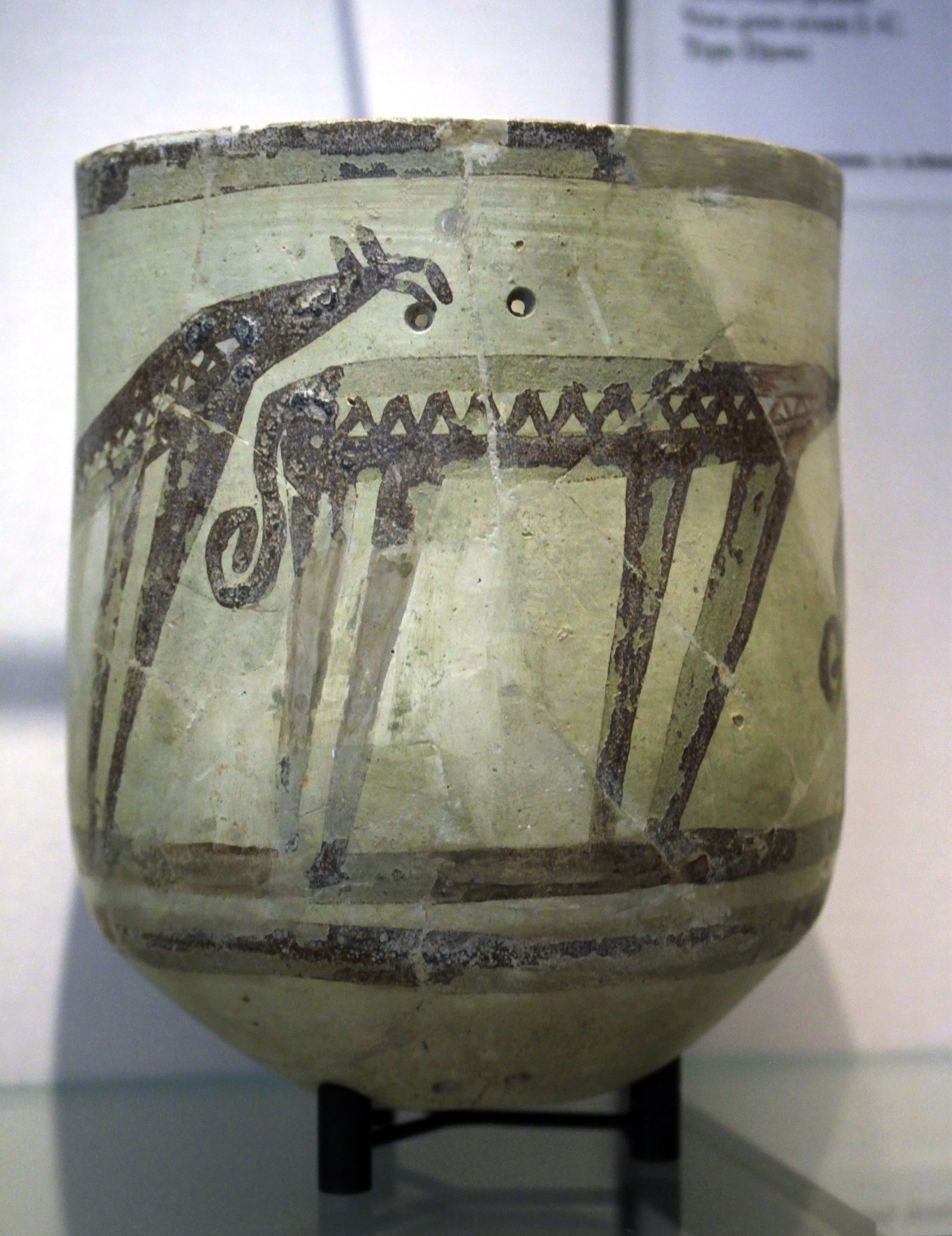
Cup decorated with three quadrupeds. Proto-Elamite pottery, circa 4000 BCE; from Tepe Djowi in Susa Valley. Louvre Museum. Similar pottery is found in Zohreh area

The Zohreh Prehistoric Project is a long-term archaeological study program launched in 2015, and focusing on the Zohreh River plain. The research continues in the area south of the modern city of Behbahan in Khuzestan province. This area was inhabited at the end of the fifth and beginning of the fourth millennia BC. The principal ancient site being excavated is Tol-e Chega Sofla, also known as Chogha Sofla. Chega Sofla represents the late Middle Susiana to Late Susiana periods of Iran. The C14 dates for Chega Sofla are currently 4,700-3,700 BC.

"Important achievements have been obtained as a result of excavations from 2015 to 2020 by "Zohreh Prehistoric Project (ZPP)" directed by Abbas Moghaddam, which can be identified as a six-thousand-year-old burial tradition with unique tomb architecture, which is the oldest example of using bricks in tombs construction."

To the north, the Behbahan plain, intersected by Marun River, is also a closely associated area.

== See also ==
- Karun River
- List of rivers of Iran
- Helleh River
- Mond River
- Mehran River
- Minab River

== Literature ==
- Birgani, Yaser Tahmasebi (2019-01-18). "Evaluation of Zohreh River Water Quality, Impacted by Natural and Anthropogenic Pollution Sources, Using Multivariate Statistical Techniques". International Journal of Environmental Sciences & Natural Resources. 16 (3). Juniper Publishers. ISSN 2572-1119.
- Moghaddam, Abbas; Miri, Negin (2007). "Archaeological Surveys in the "Eastern Corridor", South-Western Iran". Iran. 45 (1). Informa UK Limited: 23–55. doi:10.1080/05786967.2007.11864717. ISSN 0578-6967. Archived from the original on 2022-04-19.
- Falcon, N.L. (1947). Raised beaches and terraces of the Iranian Makran coast. Geographical Journal, 109, 149–151.
- Gharibreza, M., Habibi, A., Imamjomeh, S.R., & Ashraf, M.A. (2014). Coastal processes and sedimentary facies in the Zohreh River Delta (Northern Persian Gulf). CATENA, 122, 150–158.
- Jamab, E.C. (1999). Iran integrated water plan, Zohreh River watershed. In W. Research (Ed.) Tehran: Ministry of Energy.
