= Cham Tangu =

Cham Tangu چم تنگو
- Village
- Location within Iran
- Coordinates: 30°19′03″N 49°45′19″E
- Country: Iran
- Province: Khuzestan
- County: Hendijan
- Bakhsh: Central
- Rural District: Hendijan-e Sharqi

Population (2006)
  - Total: 122
- Time zone: UTC+3:30 (IRST)
  - Summer (DST): UTC+4:30 (IRDT)

Cham Tangu (Persian: چم تنگو, also Romanized as Cham Tangū) is a village in Hendijan-e Sharqi Rural District, in the Central District of Hendijan County, Khuzestan Province, Iran. At the 2006 census, its population was 122, in 25 families.
