= Mazun =

Mazun may refer to:

- Mazun (Sasanian province)
- Sohar
