= Deh-e Molla Bozorg =

Village in Khuzestan province, Iran

Deh-e Molla Bozorg Persian: ده ملا بزرگ
- Village
- Location within Iran
- Coordinates: 30°30′11″N 49°40′42″E
- Country: Iran
- Province: Khuzestan
- County: Hendijan
- District: Cham Khalaf-e Isa
- Rural District: Soviren

Population (2016)
  - Total: 874
- Time zone: UTC+3:30 (IRST)

Deh-e Molla Bozorg (Persian: ده ملابزرگ) (Note: Also romanized as Deh Mollā Bozorg, Deh Mollā-ye Bozorg, and Deh-e Mollā Bozorg; also known as Deh Mollā and Deh Mulla) is a village in Soviren Rural District of Cham Khalaf-e Isa District, Hendijan County, Khuzestan province, Iran.

== Demographics ==
=== Population ===
At the time of the 2006 National Census, the village's population was 1,031 in 218 households. The following census in 2011 counted 828 people in 228 households. The 2016 census measured the population of the village as 874 people in 250 households. It was the most populous village in its rural district.
