= Kirman (Sasanian province) =

Province of the Sasanian Empire

Kirman Kirmān
- Province of the Sasanian Empire
- 224 – 650
- Map of Kirman
- Capital: Kármana (224–480s); Shiragan (480s–650)
- Historical era: Late Antiquity
  - Established: 224
  - Muslim conquest: 650
Preceded by	Succeeded by
Parthian Empire	Rashidun Caliphate
- Today part of: Iran

Kirman (Middle Persian: Kirmān) was a Sasanian province in Late Antiquity, which corresponds to the present-day province of Kerman. The province bordered Pars in the west, Abarshahr and Sakastan in the northeast, Paradan in the east, Spahan in the north, and Mazun in the south. The capital of the province was Shiragan.

The province allegedly functioned as some kind of vassal kingdom, being mostly ruled by princes from the royal family, who bore the title of Kirmanshah ("King of Kirman"). The non-royal governors of the province bore the title of marzban.

== Name ==
The name of the province is derived from Old Persian Karmāna; the etymology of the name is debated, a popular theory is that it is related to Old Iranian *kṛma- and Middle Persian kerm ("worm").

== History ==
The province was originally part of the Parthian Empire, but was in the early 3rd-century conquered by the first Sasanian king Ardashir I (r. 224–242). According to the medieval Iranian historian al-Tabari, Ardashir I overthrew a local king in Kirman named Balash, who was either a member of the Arsacid royal family or the seven Parthian clans. Right after having the province conquered, he found the town of Veh-Ardashir close to the Dasht-e Loot. The town was a small but heavily protected town encircled by gardens and watered by many qanats, wells, and cisterns. Ardashir I also founded Narmashir, a caravan town which was constructed close to a little river near the ancient town of Bam. The capital of the province at this time is unknown—the Greek writer Ptolemy, who lived during the late Parthian era, mentions an Alexandria and Kármana mētrópolis as the towns of the province, whilst Ammianus Marcellinus mentions a “Carmana mother of all [the province’s cities]”, but they give no additional information about the province. One of Ardashir I's sons, also named Ardashir, was appointed as the governor of Kirman and given the title of Kirmanshah, which he would continue to rule during the reign of Ardashir's successor, Shapur I (r. 240–270). According to a legend, the town of Mahan was also a Sasanian foundation, being founded by another Sasanian governor of Kirman, Adhar Mahan.

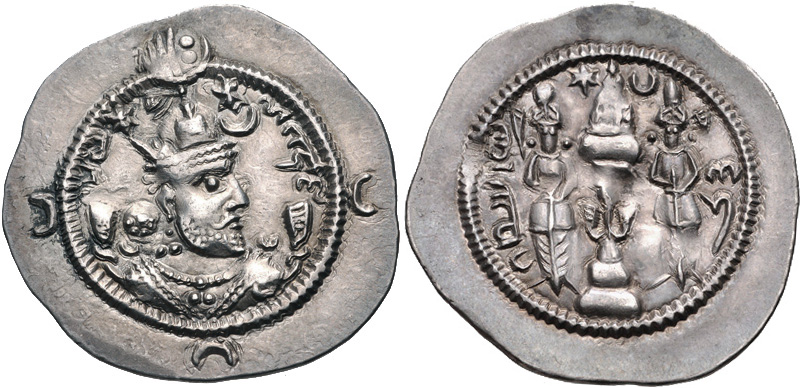
Coin of Khosrow I (r. 531–579) minted in Kirman.

Shapur II (r. 309–379), after a successful campaign against several Arab tribes in Arabia, resettled some of them in different parts of his empire, such as Kirman, where he settled some Arabs in Aban. During the reign of Shapur III (r. 383–388), his son Bahram IV governed Kirman, where he built the town of Shiragan, which would serve as the capital of the province for the remainder of the Sasanian period. The town played an important economic role, as it served as a mint city and had a great agricultural importance to the province. Khosrow I (r. 531–579) had a large part of the turbulent Pariz tribe massacred and deported. Furthermore, during his reign Kirman was brought under a huge cultivation, where many large qanats were built. According to a legend, extensive planting of trees was also made. He also divided his empire into four military districts, known as kusts—Kirman became part of the Nemroz (southeastern) kust.

During the Arab conquest of Iran, the last Sasanian king Yazdegerd III (r. 632–651) fled to Kirman in 649/50, but shortly left the province after having alienated the marzban of the province. The Arabs soon entered Kirman, where they defeated and killed the marzban, and had all of Kirman conquered. It was the Arab military leader Mujashi ibn Mas'ud al-Sulami who led the conquest of Kirman, capturing some towns by force while others surrendered without any form of major resistance. The Arabs also dealt with newly arrived Baloch migrants from the eastern Caspian area, who had seemingly occupied many parts of the province just before the arrival of the Arabs. As a result of the Arab conquest, many inhabitants of the province fled to the adjacent provinces of Sakastan and Makran.

== Geography, trade and administration ==
In terms of commerce, Kirman was oriented toward Pars and Media, whether through the Persian Gulf or its roads to the major cities of Istakhr and Hamadan. The port of Hormazd was able to send its imports via Valashgird to Jiroft and the southern route of the province. Jiroft was also connected with a central Kirman route through the mountains to Bahramabad, then through a south-eastern route from Kirmanshah and Yazd to the well-fortified city of Veh-Ardashir, which might have served as a mint-city.

A single āmārgar (chief fiscal officer) was assigned to the whole province of Kirman, which meant that the person who served as the āmārgar of the province was of high importance.

== Population ==
Kirman was mostly inhabited by Iranians, and was constantly receiving Iranian immigrants from the west, while the provinces to the farther east were slowly becoming Indian in language and culture. The language and customs of the Iranian population of Kirman was very close to the Persians and Medians.

A part of the Iranian population of Kirman was nomadic, such as the Baloch who lived in the western mountains. There were also indigenous, non-Iranian nomads in the province, such as the Jut, who were descendants of the Yutiya (Outii), who lived under the Achaemenid Empire. The Pariz tribe lived in the mountains north of Rudbar, while Arabs lived in some parts of Kirman's coast. The Kofchi, a nomadic people of obscure origins that spoke an Iranian language, inhabited the Bashagird range and its western surroundings.

== List of known governors ==
- Ardashir Kirmanshah (ca. 224 – mid 3rd-century)
- Adhar Mahan (???–???)
- Bahram Kirmanshah (???–388)
- Unnamed marzban (???–650)

== Sources ==
- Bosworth, C. Edmund (2013). "KERMAN v. From the Islamic Conquest to the Coming of the Mongols". Encyclopaedia Iranica.
- Bosworth, C. Edmund (2011). "QOFṢ". Encyclopaedia Iranica.
- Brunner, Christopher (1983). "Geographical and Administrative divisions: Settlements and Economy". The Cambridge History of Iran: The Seleucid, Parthian, and Sasanian periods (2). Cambridge: Cambridge University Press. pp. 747–778. ISBN 978-0-521-24693-4.
- Christensen, Peter (1993). The Decline of Iranshahr: Irrigation and Environments in the History of the Middle East, 500 B.C. to A.D. 1500. Museum Tusculanum Press. pp. 1–351. ISBN 9788772892597.
- Daryaee, Touraj (2011). The Oxford Handbook of Iranian History. Oxford University Press. pp. 1–432. ISBN 978-0199875757. Archived from the original on 2019-01-01.
- MacKenzie, D. N.; Chaumont, M. L. (1989). "ĀMĀRGAR". Encyclopaedia Iranica. pp. 925–926.
- Morony, M. (1986). "ʿARAB ii. Arab conquest of Iran". Encyclopaedia Iranica, Vol. II, Fasc. 2. pp. 203–210.
- Morony, Michael (1989). "BEH-ARDAŠĪR". Encyclopaedia Iranica, Vol. IV, Fasc. 1. pp. 93–94.
- Planhol, Xavier de; Hourcade, Bernard (2014). "KERMAN ii. Historical Geography". Encyclopaedia Iranica.
- Al-Tabari, Abu Ja'far Muhammad ibn Jarir (1985–2007). Ehsan Yar-Shater (ed.). The History of Al-Ṭabarī. Vol. 40 vols. Albany, NY: State University of New York Press.
- Zarrinkub, Abd al-Husain (1975). "The Arab conquest of Iran and its aftermath". The Cambridge History of Iran, Volume 4: From the Arab Invasion to the Saljuqs. Cambridge: Cambridge University Press. pp. 1–57. ISBN 978-0-521-20093-6.
- Schmitt, Rüdiger (1990). "CARMANIA". Encyclopaedia Iranica, Vol. IV, Fasc. 7. pp. 822–823.
- Elfenbein, J. (1988). "BALUCHISTAN iii. Baluchi Language and Literature". Encyclopaedia Iranica, Vol. III, Fasc. 6. pp. 633–644.
