= Sasanian Arabia =

Sasanian political, military, and commercial involvement in Arabia

The Sasanian Empire at its greatest extent under Khosrow II. Sasanian involvement in Arabia was concentrated in Yemen, Oman/Mazun, the Gulf littoral, and the Lakhmid frontier at al-Hira.

Sasanian Arabia refers to the regions of the Arabian Peninsula that were under the political influence, military occupation, or cultural hegemony of the Sasanian Empire (224–651 CE) in Arabia's late antique era. Sasanian Arabia was not a single administrative region, but instead, the range of areas on the Arabian Peninsula under a spectrum of Sasanian influence. Sasanian influence was heaviest in Eastern Arabia and the Gulf Coast (much of this part of the historical region of Beth Qatraye), modern-day Oman (historical Mazun), the Nasrid kingdom of Al-Hira in southern Iraq, and Yemen between the 570s (after the Aksumite–Persian wars) and 630s (during the early Muslim conquests). The Persians long had an influence on the Arabian Peninsula, well before the Sasanian dynasty came into power, going back at least to the era of Achaemenid Arabia.

Sasanian authority in Arabia was concentrated in the east and the south. Royal inscriptions and later Arabic and Persian traditions present the Sasanians as rulers or suzerains over parts of eastern Arabia, while Syriac, Greek, Armenian, and Arabic sources preserve evidence for diplomatic, military, and ecclesiastical ties between Arabia and the Sasanian world. Archaeology gives a more cautious picture. In eastern Arabia especially, the Sasanian period appears to have been one of limited settlement and weak material integration, rather than the dense imperial occupation sometimes inferred from later literary sources. In recent years, a Sasanian fort at Fulayj in Oman was excavated, providing the strongest physical evidence so far of Sasanian occupation in the region.

The Sasanians used Arabia for several purposes. Its Gulf shores mattered for maritime traffic between Fars, Mesopotamia, India, and the western Indian Ocean; its northern and central tribal politics mattered for the defence of Iraq and for competition with Rome; and Yemen mattered in the Red Sea conflict among Aksum, Himyar, Byzantium, and Iran. Much of Sasanian Arabia was governed indirectly, through local allies and Arab clients, rather than a continuously occupied province.

== Terminology and geography ==
"Sasanian Arabia" is a modern historical label. The Sasanians and their neighbours used several regional terms that only partly overlap with modern Arabia. Bahrayn in late antique and early Islamic usage referred not only to the island of Bahrain but more broadly to the eastern Arabian coast between Kuwait and Qatar. Uman referred to the Oman peninsula, including northern Oman and parts of what is now the United Arab Emirates. Mazun appears in Sasanian and related sources as a name for Oman or south-eastern Arabia. The northern Sasanian frontier with Arabia centred on lower Iraq and Al-Hira, while South Arabia corresponds broadly to Yemen and the former Himyarite kingdom.

== Pre-Sasanian background ==
Arabia had already been partly mapped, claimed, and managed by imperial powers before the rise of the Sasanians. After the conquests of Alexander the Great extended the Hellenistic world into the Near East, the Arabian Peninsula began to be systematically understood in the Greek and Roman worlds through contact, exploration, warfare, and trade. Hellenistic geographical writing treated Arabia as a large but indistinct region between Egypt, Syria, Mesopotamia, the Red Sea, and the Gulf. The Roman province of Arabia, created after the annexation of the Nabataean Kingdom in 106 CE, extended Roman military and administrative activity into northwest Arabia and the Hejaz, including Hegra, Dumat al-Jandal, and Ruwafa, however there was no clearly defined border (although the desert frontier with northern Arabia was broadly reflected by the Limes Arabicus). Nevertheless, Romans exerted continuous influence, eventually shifting from direct rule through the exercise of influence via diplomacy and local proxies; the Sasanians would come to use similar methods, especially through their capital Al-Hira in Mesopotamia, under the power of their primary allies, the Nasrids (or Lakhmids).

The eastern side of the peninsula had a different prehistory. Eastern Arabia was connected to the Gulf polities of Gerrha, Tylos, Characene, and the Parthian dynasty before the Sasanian rulers of Persia emerged. The role played by the Parthians in eastern Arabia remains poorly understood.

== Sources and interpretation ==
=== Literary sources ===
The most detailed sources outlining the role of the Sasanians comes centuries after the collapse of the Sasanian Empire, from Arabic-Islamic sources, in the histories and chronologies of the ninth to eleventh centuries (especially Al-Tabari, Al-Dinawari, Hamza al-Isfahani, Balami, and Gardizi). These authors wrote about, and were fascinated by, the stories of Ardashir I, Shapur II, the Nasrids, and the Persian conquest of Yemen. While some details of these accounts are helpful, they often confuse older memories, royal historiography, regional tradition and they retroject Islamic-era political geography to earlier eras. The most detailed information about Oman comes from a tenth-century Ansab, but historians such as Harry Munt doubt that it directly reflects treaties or landholding systems from the era of Sasanian Oman.

=== Inscriptions ===
Inscriptions about Sasanian Arabia are severely limited and are largely found in Sasanian centers rather than the Arabian Peninsula itself. Shapur I's inscription at the Ka'ba-ye Zartosht, which is located in modern-day Iran, mentions "Arabia" and (separately) Mazun as lands under his rule. The Paikuli inscription of Narseh, known from Iraq, names an Arab ruler associated with the Lakhmids, indicating Sasanian links with Arab clients by the late third or early fourth century.

=== Archaeology ===
Secure Sasanian-period finds in eastern Arabia include coins, seals, pottery, graves, fortified residences, and a small number of settlements. Derek Kennet's catalogue includes evidence from Thaj, Qatif, Tarut, Qal'at al-Bahrain, Saar, Ed-Dur, Mleiha, Kush, Khatt, Jazirat al-Ghanam, Fujairah, and sites in Oman. Much of this material indicates contact with the Sasanian world rather than direct Sasanian settlement. Isolated burials with Sasanian artefacts may belong to mobile or semi-mobile groups participating in regional exchange and frontier politics.

However, Kennet's survey of eastern Arabia also concluded that many published "Sasanian" identifications from older work may be incorrect, and that more secure evidence in relation to the Sasanians points to a decline in settlements, tombs, and coin circulation compared with the Hellenistic and Parthian periods. Overall, archaeological patterns differs from older reconstructions of the history of the region. Instead of there having been a prosperous and heavily developed Sasanian presence in eastern Arabia, Kennet sees a marked decline in visible settlement, tombs, and coinage compared with the earlier Achaemenid and Parthian periods. Greg Fisher's own and more recent historical synthesis accepts these findings, while proposing alternative approaches to a Sasanian presence, including shifts toward nomadism or different settlement patterns that leave fewer traces. Additional work by Morley has drawn attention to the chronological patterns of Sasanian coin finds in eastern Arabia, with concentrations under Shapur II and again in the late fifth to seventh centuries. The state of the evidence has also been improved by a major archaeological find in recent years, a Sasanian fort in Oman at a site called Fulayj. This find is considered highly significant and partially corrective of the minimalist view, but presently, is also exceptional.

== Early Sasanian expansion in eastern Arabia ==
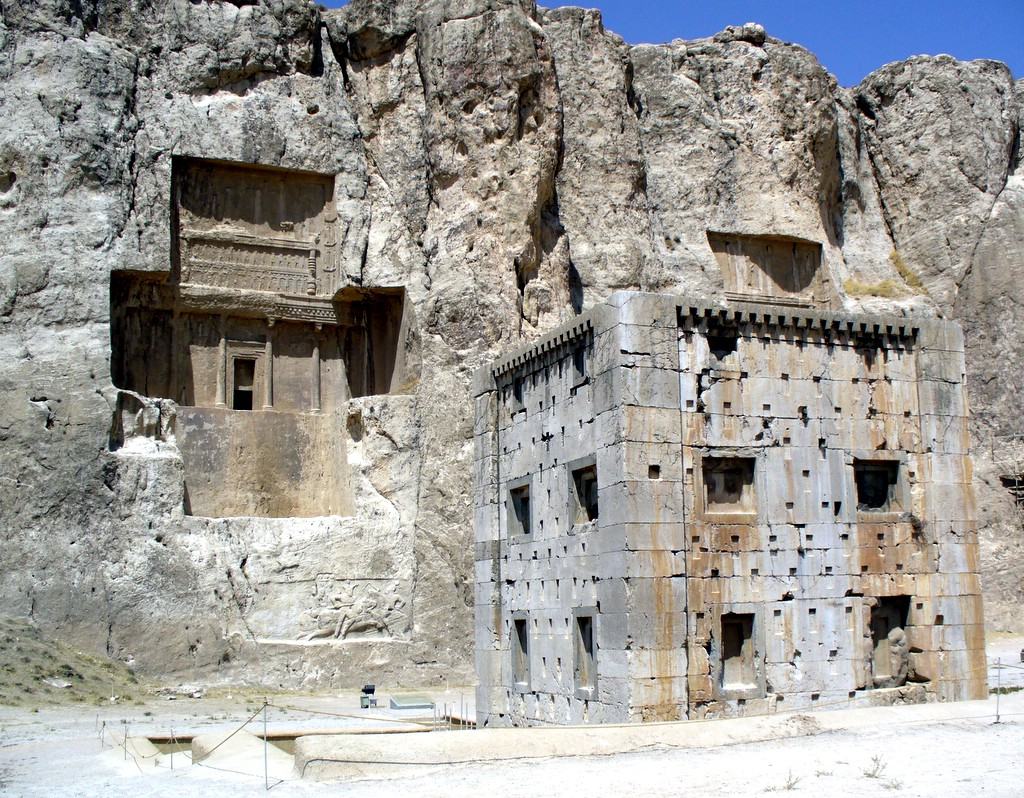
The Ka'ba-ye Zartosht at Naqsh-e Rostam, where Shapur I’s inscription lists the lands claimed by the early Sasanian empire, including Oman/Mazun.

In post-Sasanian Arabic and Persian stories, the beginning of Sasanian involvement in eastern Arabia is traced back to Ardashir I, the founder of the Sasanian dynasty. Al-Dinawari reports that Ardashir marched against Oman, Bahrain, and Yamama, while other traditions describe his conflict with a ruler of Bahrain named Sanatruq or Sinatrukes, a name that may point to a Parthian or Characene connection. These narratives are difficult to verify in detail. They may preserve memories of actual Sasanian campaigns, but they also reflect the later tendency to project a coherent project of imperial conquest onto regions where control was likely intermittent at most.

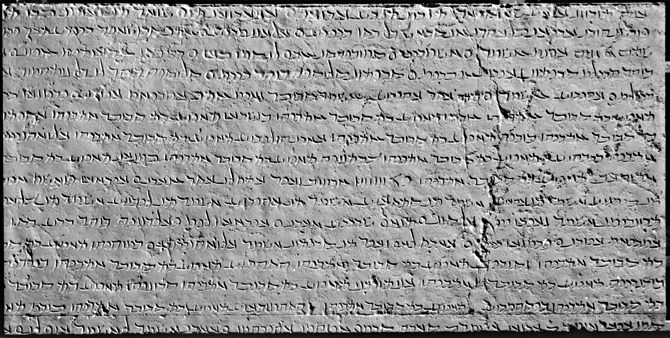
Parthian version of Shapur I’s inscription at the Ka'ba-ye Zartosht.

The political logic of such campaigns is nevertheless plausible. Ardashir's dynasty emerged from Fars, immediately across the Gulf from eastern Arabia. Gulf traffic, Arab raids, and the remains of Parthian-aligned authority on the Arabian coast all affected the security of the Sasanian heartland. Early Sasanian traditions also associate Ardashir with the foundation of ports or fortified settlements on both sides of the Gulf, which may have represented attempts at dominating the economic landscape of Gulf commerce, or act as naval or military strongholds. Inscriptions from the time of Shapur I indicate an early Sasanian involvement in eastern Arabia and Oman.

== Shapur II and the Gulf frontier ==
Traditions about Shapur II from Islamic-era Arabic chronicles emphasize how his politics was informed by the pressure of constant raiding by Arab nomads into regions such as Fars and southern Iran. For example, Al-Tabari describes Shapur crossing the Gulf to al-Khatt, marching through Bahrayn and Hajar, attacking tribes including Banu Tamim, Banu Bakr, and Abd al-Qays, and destroying wells in Yamama. Middle Persian and Persianate sources also remembered Shapur as a ruler who punished Arabs who had raided Iranian territory. The Bundahishn and Gardizi connect his reputation with warfare against the Arabs, while later traditions explain his epithet Dhu al-Aktaf as "piercer of shoulders".

While literary details surrounding these accounts are doubted by modern historians, it is also accepted that Arab raiding was a matter of regular concern in Sasanian affairs and politics. For example, the commercial status of the Gulf was also valuable to these other groups, and the Gulf region was also a corridor through which raids could travel deeper into wealthier Sasanian lands, such as Fars. Political authority in Eastern Arabia may have constantly drifted back-and-forth between recurring attempts by the Sasanians at imposing control, on the one hand, and raiding pressure against Iran, on the other. The defensive works attributed to Shapur II on the Iraqi desert frontier, including the Khandaq Shapur or "moat of the Arabs", belong to the same strategic world, even if their exact chronology and extent are debated. Morley treats Shapur's campaign as hoping to build a broader, fortified zone that protected Sasanian territory across Mesopotamia, Khuzestan, and Fars from Arabian raiding.

== The Lakhmids and Al-Hira ==
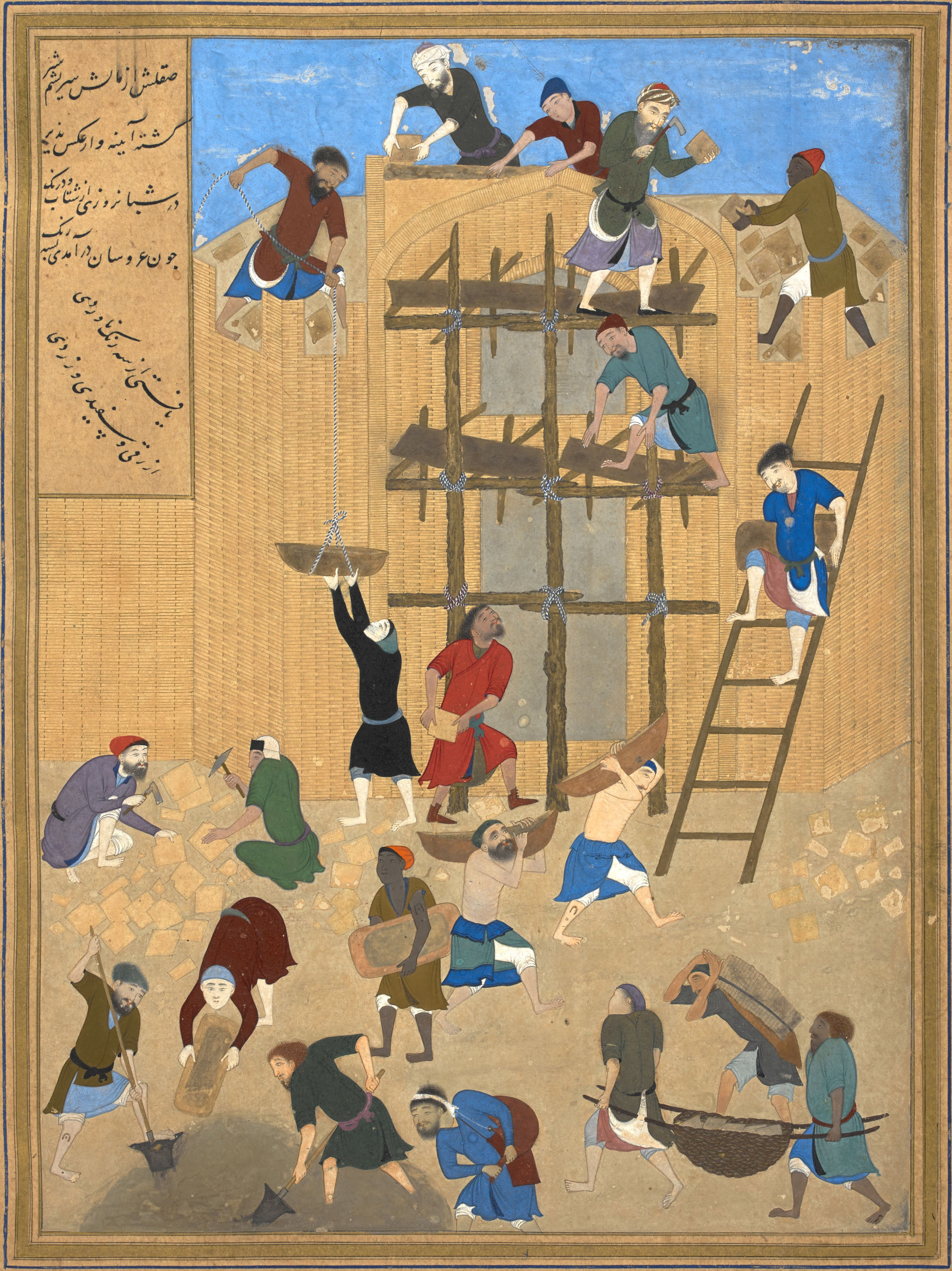
A fifteenth-century Persian miniature depicting the construction of Khawarnaq, the legendary palace associated with al-Hira and the Lakhmid court.

The Lakhmids (also called Nasrids) were the most important Arab clients of the Sasanians. Their capital at Al-Hira lay near the lower Euphrates and close to the Sasanian capital region in Iraq. Through their Lakhmid allies, the Sasanians projected influence deep into the Arabian steppe, through managing relations with various Arab groups on the one hand and countering the influence of Roman-backed Arab clients such as the Jafnids on the other. The Lakhmids were critical to Sasania's two-tier defensive system from the Arabian Peninsula and other potential enemies on their western border: the inner defensive system consisted of a fortified line and series of cities that guarded the settled core, and the outer system was made up of Arab client states that formed an outer shield with a much deeper penetration into Arabia.

Contrary to later representations, the Lakhmids and other Arab groups did not merely have a relationship of subordination to the Sasanians. Instead, while they received patronage leading to them acting as agents of the Sasanians or operating alongside them in some cases, they also had a well-developed political identity and, at times, acted at the expense of Sasanian interests when it benefited them.

The Lakhmids were also tied to eastern Arabia. Al-Tabari presents Al-Mundhir as controlling Bahrain and Yamama on behalf of the Sasanians after the death of Al-Harith, the leader of the Kingdom of Kinda in central Arabia. While historians are not confident in the exact political and administrative reconstruction of these sources, Greg Fisher treats this as part of a wider attempt by Nasrid leaders to enlarge their activities in Arabia during a period of Roman-Sasanian competition.

In the early seventh century, Khosrow II removed the last Lakhmid ruler, al-Nu'man III, and replaced the dynasty with a different arrangement at al-Hira. The reasons are disputed. Later Arabic tradition gives courtly and personal explanations, while Syriac and modern analyses emphasize al-Nu'man's vulnerability once Khosrow decided to move against him. Howard-Johnston has suggested that Khosrow's westward imperial ambitions made a single hereditary Arab client dynasty less useful. Whatever the precise cause, the dissolution of the Lakhmid kingdom weakened a long-standing Sasanian mechanism for managing the desert frontier.

== Oman and Mazun ==
Mazun (roughly modern-day Oman) was one of the major sites of Sasanian influence in Arabia. Mazun was listed as a Sasanian possession as early as the time of Shapur I, and later geographical and ecclesiastical sources continued to place Oman within, or at least adjacent to, the Sasanian imperial world. For example, the Armenian Ashkharhats'oyts, the Syriac Chronicle of Pseudo-Zachariah, and the ecclesiastical geography of the Church of the East all support the view that late Sasanian writers and neighbouring communities could regard Oman as part of the territory of the Sasanian Empire.

Nevrtheless, Oman is absent from published Sasanian seals and bullae, and it is unlikely that a province was directly set up and administered in the region. The most detailed Arabic account of Persian rule in Oman, preserved by Ps.-Awtabi, says that the Persians occupied the coastal plain while the Azd retained authority in the mountains and desert. It also refers to 4,000 asawira and maraziba with a tax collector near the Julanda rulers. While potentially containing some memories of pre-Islamic Oman, this source is also very late.

The archaeology of Oman has contributed a growing body of evidence to this debate. Older scholarship sometimes linked late Sasanian rule to major agricultural expansion, especially in the Batinah. One reassessment instead found little support for this, with another suggesting that while Sasanian Oman may have mattered to imperial strategy, this need not have happened alongside the level of settlement, agricultural development, and bureaucratic control that previous generations of historians assumed.

The only direct archaeological evidence for a Sasanian presence in Oman is the newly discovered fort at Fulayj. Located inland from the Batinah coast, about 30 km south of Sohar, it is a small square fort with thick stone walls, corner towers, and a narrow defended entrance. Its military character is clear from its construction, lack of domestic assemblage, and isolation from a surrounding settlement. Radiocarbon and ceramic evidence date its construction and use to the fifth or sixth century, with occupation continuing until the mid-seventh century or a brief reuse at that time. The excavators argue that Fulayj was probably built and provisioned by a professional foreign military force, most likely the Sasanians.

== Yemen and South Arabia ==
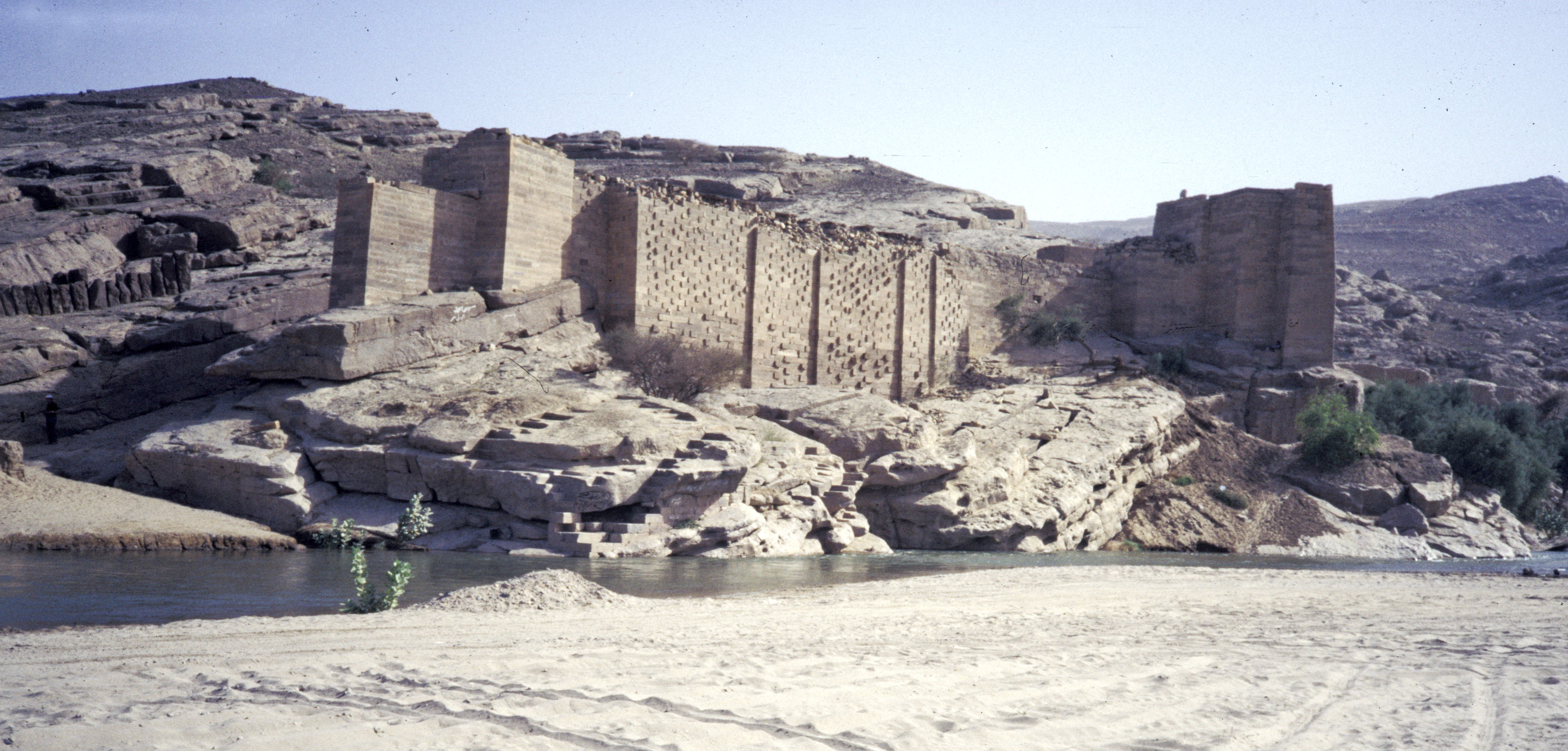
Ruins of the Great Dam of Marib.

Sasanian involvement in Yemen belongs to the wider Red Sea conflict of the sixth century. After the persecution of Christians under the Himyarite ruler Yusuf As'ar Yath'ar, known in later tradition as Dhu Nuwas, Aksumite forces invaded South Arabia in 525 and installed a Christian regime. The Aksumite presence in Himyar drew South Arabia into the rivalry among Aksum, Byzantium, and the Sasanians. Abraha's rule, his diplomacy, and his campaigns in Arabia formed part of this broader late antique contest.

According to later Arabic and Persian traditions, a Jewish South Arabian figure, Sayf ibn Dhi Yazan, sought help first from Byzantium and then from the Sasanian king Khosrow I. Khosrow sent a force under the general Wahrez, which expelled the Ethiopians from Yemen. Bowersock places the end of Aksumite rule around 575 and describes the subsequent Persian occupation as holding together a religiously unstable South Arabia of Christians, Jews, and pagans. Munt notes that, unlike Oman, South Arabia is supported by contemporary evidence for sixth-century Sasanian diplomatic interest and later occupation, including the Marib Dam inscription's reference to a Persian embassy and Theophanes of Byzantium's notice of the Sasanian conquest of Yemen.

Yemen became the clearest case of direct Sasanian rule in Arabia. Later narratives describe Sayf as a Persian client, followed by Persian commanders and governors. Al-Tabari's account names Wahriz, his descendants, and finally Badhan, the Persian governor of Yemen at the time of Muhammad. The exact details of the succession of Persian officials are difficult to disentangle, and some accounts conflate the reigns of Khosrow I and Khosrow II. Still, the broad sequence is secure: Aksumite power in Yemen ended in the later sixth century, and the Sasanians replaced it with a Persian-backed regime that survived into the early Islamic period.

== Economy ==
The Gulf was central to Sasanian interest in Arabia. Fars, the dynastic homeland, faced the Arabian coast across a sea route linking Mesopotamia, India, East Africa, and the wider western Indian Ocean. Daryaee argues that late antique conflicts between Rome and Iran made maritime routes through the Persian Gulf increasingly important as overland and northern routes became politically vulnerable. Gulf ports such as Bushihr and Siraf connected the coast to inland Fars, while early Islamic geographers preserve memories of merchants, maritime travel, pearls, textiles, and other commodities tied to the region.

The extent of state control over this commerce is debated. Daryaee emphasizes Sasanian control of Gulf ports and sea traffic, while Munt notes that the evidence for trade as the primary motive of late Sasanian involvement in Oman remains thin. Morley gives the strongest version of the strategic-economic interpretation: north-eastern Arabia mattered because it protected the "soft underbelly" of the Sasanian Empire and gave access to the Persian Gulf trade routes. Other motives may have included copper, pearls, dates, taxation, military security, and the ideological incorporation of coastal Arabia into the territory of the king of kings.

The Sasanian navy is likewise difficult to reconstruct. Dmitriev argues that the Sasanians cannot be treated simply as a land power: Persian naval or transport capacity was necessary for operations across the Gulf and, in the sixth century, for the conquest of Yemen. Even so, the evidence does not show a permanent, heavily documented navy comparable to the Roman or Byzantine fleets. Sasanian maritime power in Arabia was probably practical and episodic: ships, ports, fortified sites, and allied coastal groups were mobilized when Gulf security, Red Sea politics, or Indian Ocean commerce required them.

== Religion ==
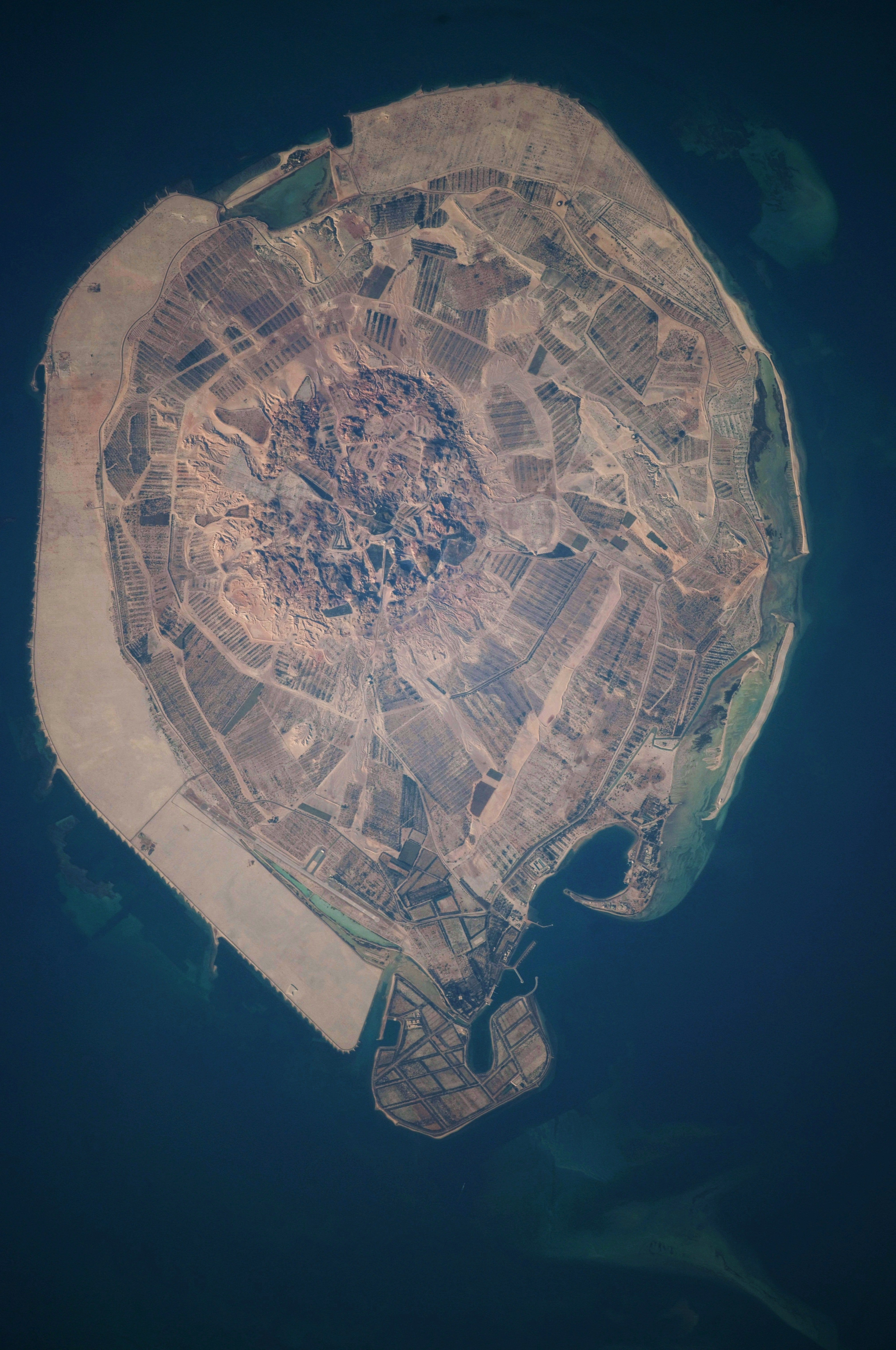
Church of the East monastery on Sir Bani Yas island provides archaeological evidence for late antique Christianity in the Gulf.

Christianity, through the Church of the East, was a major religion in late antique Eastern Arabia. The historical region of Beth Qatraye was the most significant region of the Christian community here, and it was linked ecclesiastically to the metropolitan of Rev Ardashir in Fars. Kennet notes that the episcopal unit encompassing Bahrain came under this metropolitan jurisdiction, although the absence of Arabian bishops from several synods may reflect political disruption in the region. Munt observes that bishops of Mazun are attested as attending international Christian synods according to the Synodicon orientale in 424, 544, and 576, and that the ecclesiastical geography may partly mirror, and therefore inform us of, Sasanian imperial geography.

== End of Sasanian rule in Arabia ==
Some time between 601 and 611, the Sasanians lost the Battle of Dhu Qar, which took place near Kufa between Persian forces (and their Arab allies) with the Banu Bakr, a confederation of Arab tribes. Whether it was a full-fledged battle as in later memory, or as is more likely in recent assessment a more minor skirmish, it exposed the weakness on the Sasanian frontier to Arabia and it became a symbolic victory of Arabs over Persians. Tradition eventually tied this event to the ultimate end of the Sasanian influence on Arabia, the collapse of the Sasanian Empire, and the rise of Islam.

At the beginning of the seventh century, Sasanian influence in Arabia was already under severe stress. In addition to the Battle of Dhu Qar, the Lakhmid kingdom collapsed around 602 CE. With that, the Sasanians lost a major historical Arab ally that was responsible for managing their frontier with the peninsula. In addition, the Sasanian Empire had been exhausted by the decades of the Byzantine–Sasanian War of 602–628. Furthermore, with the dissolution of the Lakhmids, the main historical Ara ally and client of the Sasanians, the Sasanian core was further exposed. Eastern Arabia and Oman were still remembered as formally connected with the Sasanian world, but no single authority controlled the region by the time Muhammad sent letters to local rulers and officials. In other words, no unified regional power is likely to have existed in these places in the 630s.

In Yemen, Persian rule passed into the Islamic period through the conversion and surrender of local Persian officials and their descendants, often known in Arabic sources as the abna or "sons" of the Persians. In eastern Arabia and Oman, Sasanian garrisons, governors, client rulers, and coastal authorities were absorbed or displaced during the Islamization of the region and the subsequent conquest of the Sasanian Empire. The end of Sasanian Arabia was therefore not a single event. It was the collapse of several overlapping arrangements: client kingship at Al-Hira, Persian-backed rule in Yemen, coastal and military footholds in Oman, and looser claims over Bahrain and the Gulf.

== See also ==
- Achaemenid Arabia
- Arabia in late antiquity
- Battle of Dhu Qar
- Beth Qatraye
- Lakhmids
- Pre-Islamic Arabia
- Sasanian Yemen
