= Sar Khareh-ye Olya =

Sar Khareh-ye Olya سرخره عليا
- Village
- Location within Iran
- Coordinates: 30°26′06″N 49°42′44″E
- Country: Iran
- Province: Khuzestan
- County: Hendijan
- Bakhsh: Cham Khalaf-e Isa
- Rural District: Cham Khalaf-e Isa

Population (2006)
  - Total: 170
- Time zone: UTC+3:30 (IRST)
  - Summer (DST): UTC+4:30 (IRDT)

Sar Khareh-ye Olya (Persian: سرخره عليا, also Romanized as Sar Khareh-ye ‘Olyā and Sarkhareh-ye ‘Olyā; also known as Şafā’īyeh) is a village in Cham Khalaf-e Isa Rural District, Cham Khalaf-e Isa District, Hendijan County, Khuzestan Province, Iran. At the 2006 census, its population was 170, in 35 families.
