= Carmania =

Carmania may refer to:

- Carmania (region), an ancient satrapy of the Achaemenid Persian empire
  - Alexandria Carmania, a former city in Carmania founded by Alexander the Great
- Kerman province in the south-east of Iran
- RMS Carmania (1905), a Cunard liner built 1905
- RMS Carmania (1954), a Cunard liner, originally RMS Saxonia
- British Rail Class 40 diesel locomotive D218
