= Achaemenid Arabia =

Satrapy of the Achaemenid Empire

Achaemenid Arabia
𐎠𐎼𐎲𐎠𐎹, Arabāya

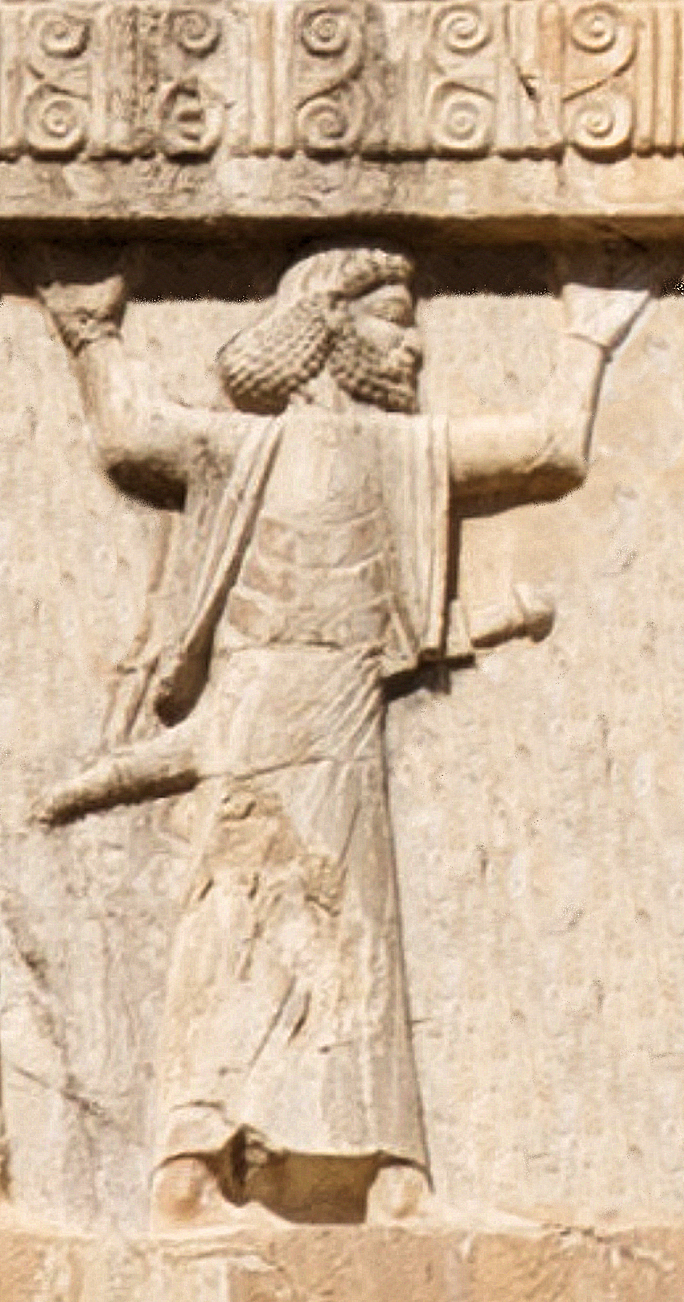
Arab soldier (Old Persian cuneiform: 𐎠𐎼𐎲𐎠𐎹, Arabāya) of the Achaemenid army, circa 480 BCE. Xerxes I tomb relief.

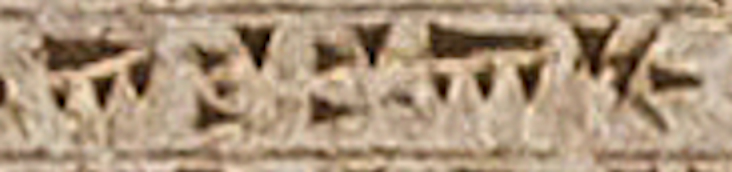
The name for Arabia as an Achaemenid territory in the DNa inscription of Darius the Great (circa 490 BC): Arabāya (𐎠𐎼𐎲𐎠𐎹)

Arabia (Old Persian cuneiform: 𐎠𐎼𐎲𐎠𐎹, Arabāya) was a satrapy (province) of the Achaemenid Empire. Achaemenid Arabia corresponded to the lands between Nile Delta (Egypt) and Mesopotamia, later known to Romans as Arabia Petraea, as well as Arabia Deserta and Arabia Felix. According to Herodotus, Cambyses did not subdue the Arabs when he attacked Egypt in 525 BCE. His successor Darius the Great mentions the Arabs in the Behistun inscription from the first years of his reign, and in later texts. This suggests that Darius might have conquered this part of Arabia, or that it was originally part of another province, perhaps Achaemenid Babylonia, but later became its own province.

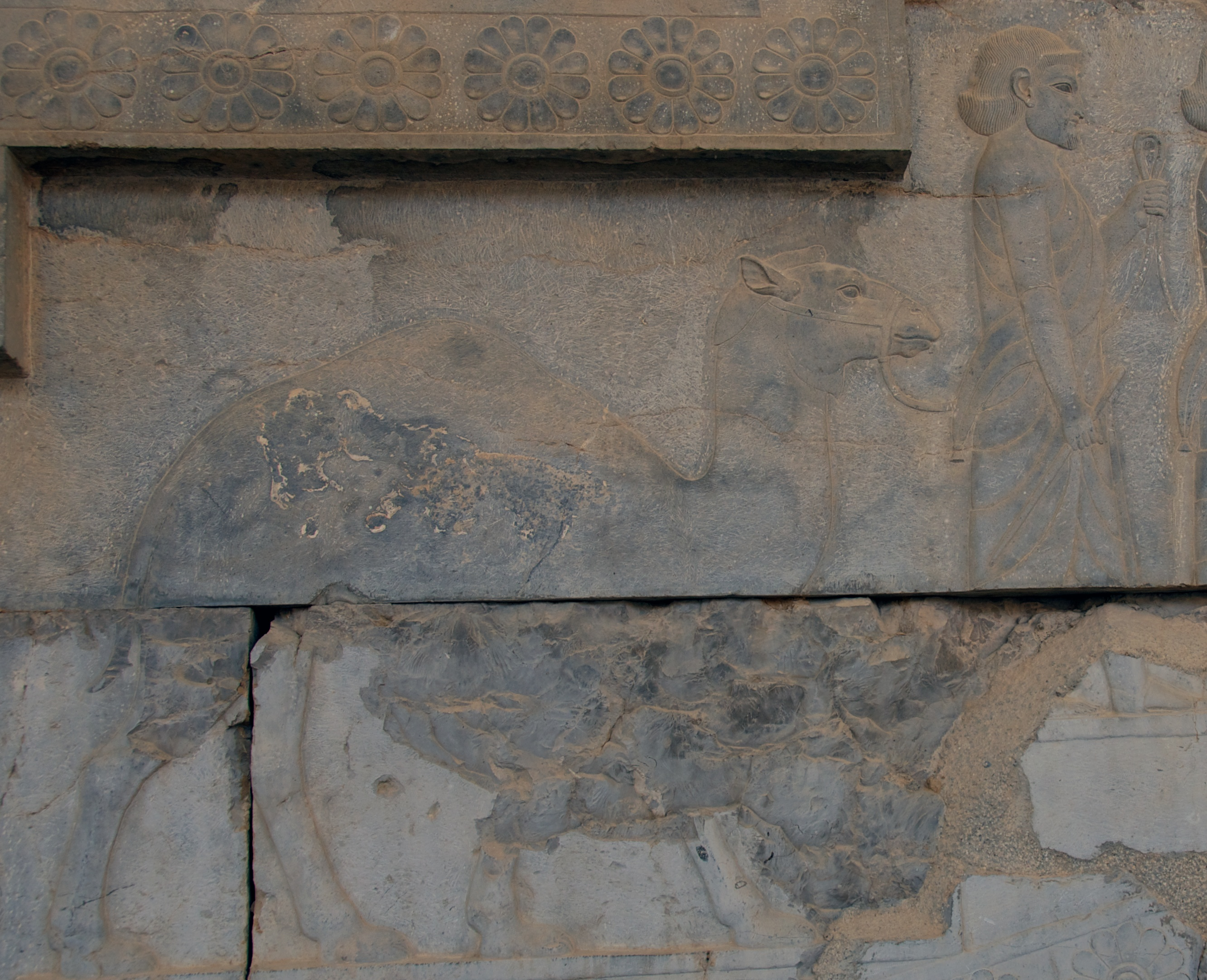
Relief of the Arabian delegation bearing a dromedary, Apadana stairs of Persepolis

Arabs were not considered as subjects to the Achaemenids, as other peoples were, and were exempt from taxation. Instead, they simply provided 1,000 talents of frankincense a year. They also helped the Achaemenids invade Egypt by providing water skins to the troops crossing the desert.

They were enrolled in the Achaemenid army and participated to the Second Persian invasion of Greece (479–480 BCE). Arab soldier in the service of the Achaemenids are depicted in the reliefs of the imperial tombs of Naqsh-e Rustam. An Arab delegation bringing a dromedar appears on the Apadana reliefs at Persépolis.

== See also ==
- Beth Qatraye
- Mazun (historical region)
- Sasanian Arabia
