= Moshrageh =

Moshrageh or Masharageh or Meshrageh or Mosharageh (Persian: مشراگه) may refer to:

- Masharageh, Hendijan
- Moshrageh, Ramshir
- Moshrageh District, in Ramshir County
- Moshrageh Rural District, in Ramshir County
