= Haregī, Iran =

Haregī
- Village
- Location within Iran
- Coordinates: 25°41′00″N 59°19′00″E
- Country: Iran
- Province: Sīstān va Balūchestān
- County: Chabahar County
- Elevation: 10 m (33 ft)
- Time zone: UTC+3:30 (IRST)
  - Summer (DST): UTC+4:30 (IRDT)

Haregī, also known as Hargī, or Harqī is a town in the Province of Sīstān va Balūchestān, Iran.

Located at Latitude 25.4906°N and Longitude 59.2967° E, the village is located on the Iranian coast looking over the Gulf of Oman, and is 210km from the port of Jask, and about 150 km from the Port of Chabahar, the county capital.

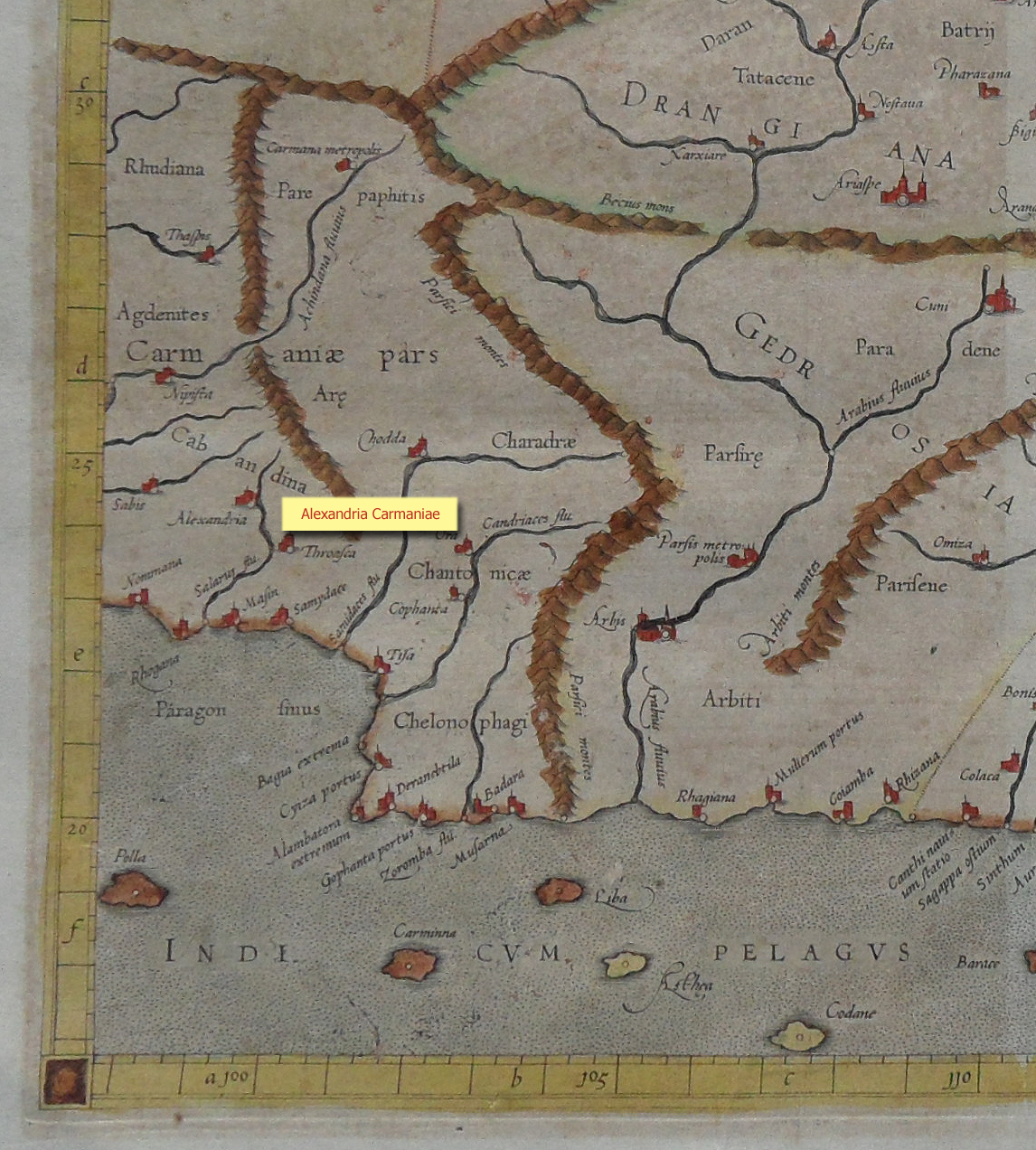
Carmania (satrapy)

The village sits aside an ephemeral stream that some have identified with the Salarus River which Ptolemy though was the site of Alexandria Carmania.
