= Fathabad, Jiroft =

Fathabad فتح اباد
- Village
- Location within Iran
- Coordinates: 28°39′36″N 57°09′04″E
- Country: Iran
- Province: Kerman
- County: Jiroft
- Bakhsh: Central
- Rural District: Esfandaqeh

Population (2006)
  - Total: 220
- Time zone: UTC+3:30 (IRST)
  - Summer (DST): UTC+4:30 (IRDT)

Fathabad (Persian: فتح اباد, also Romanized as Fatḩābād; also known as Gāvkosh) is a village in Esfandaqeh Rural District, in the Central District of Jiroft County, Kerman Province, Iran. At the 2006 census, its population was 220, in 58 families.

It is one of many sites in the district that have been proposed for the lost city of Alexandria Carmania founded by Alexander the Great.

== Gallery ==
The village is famous for Fathabad Garden which is located 16 km northwest of Kerman. According to historians, the same construction pattern has been used at Shazdeh Garden in Mahan.

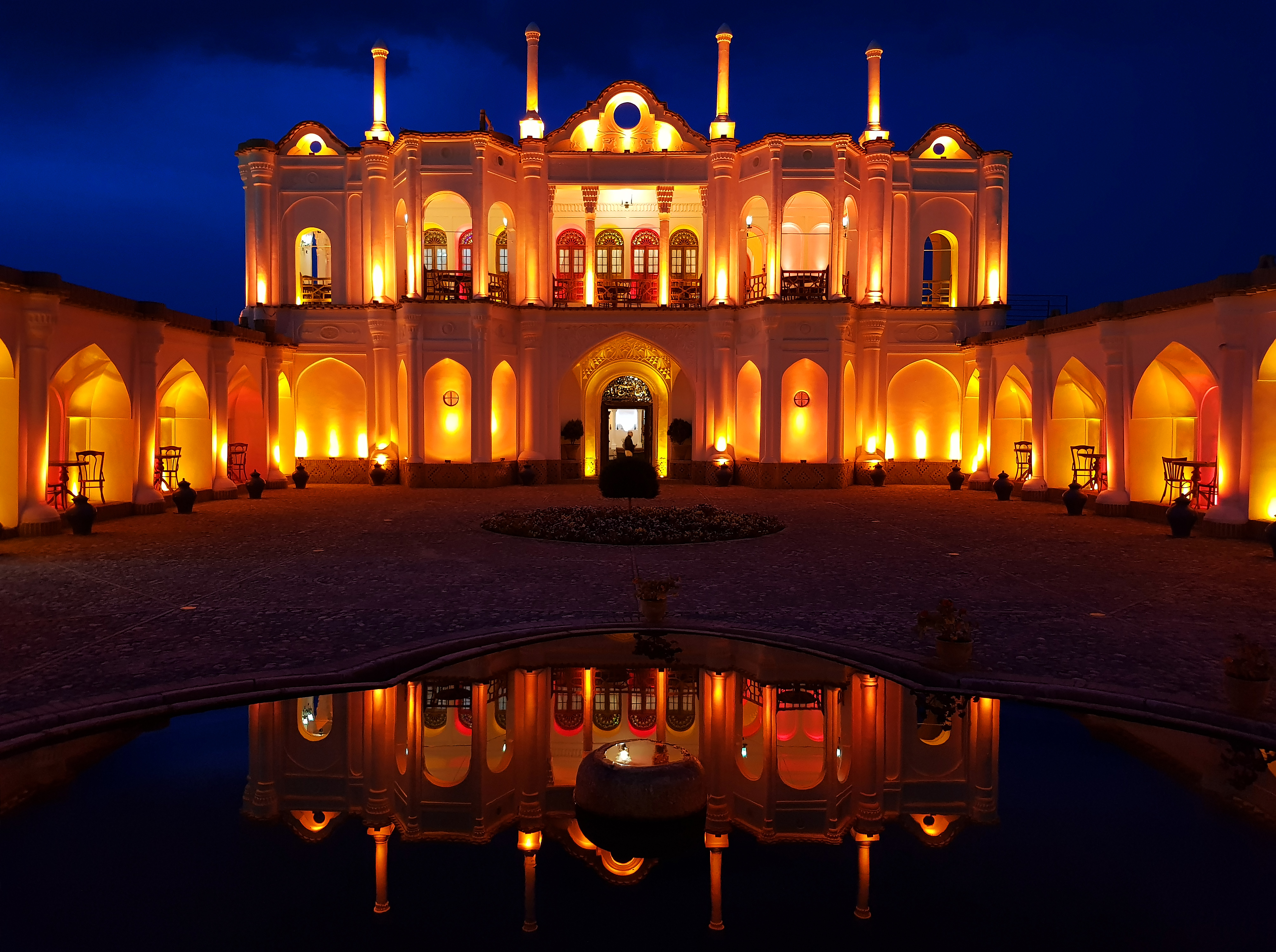
Fathabad Garden

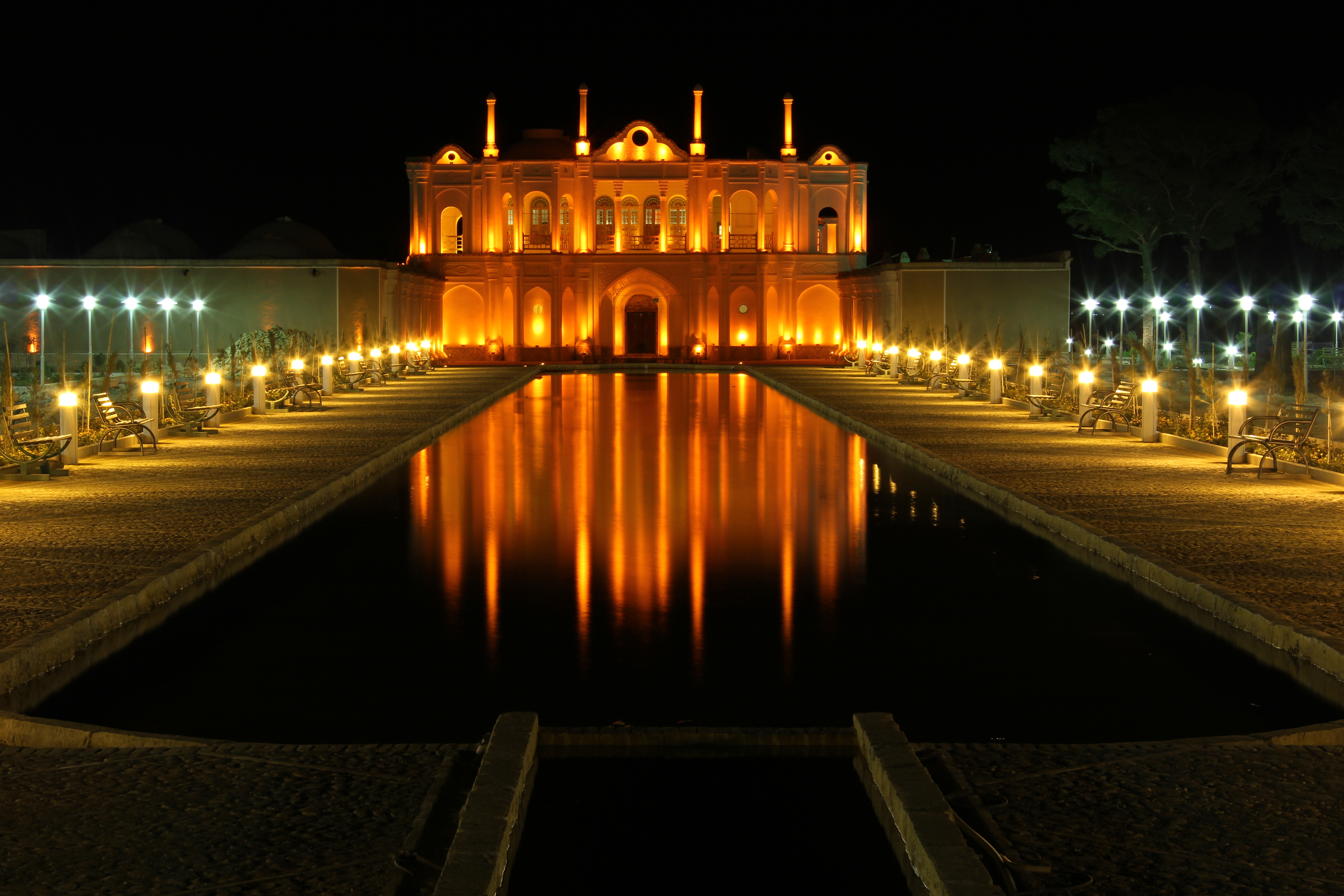
Fathabad Garden

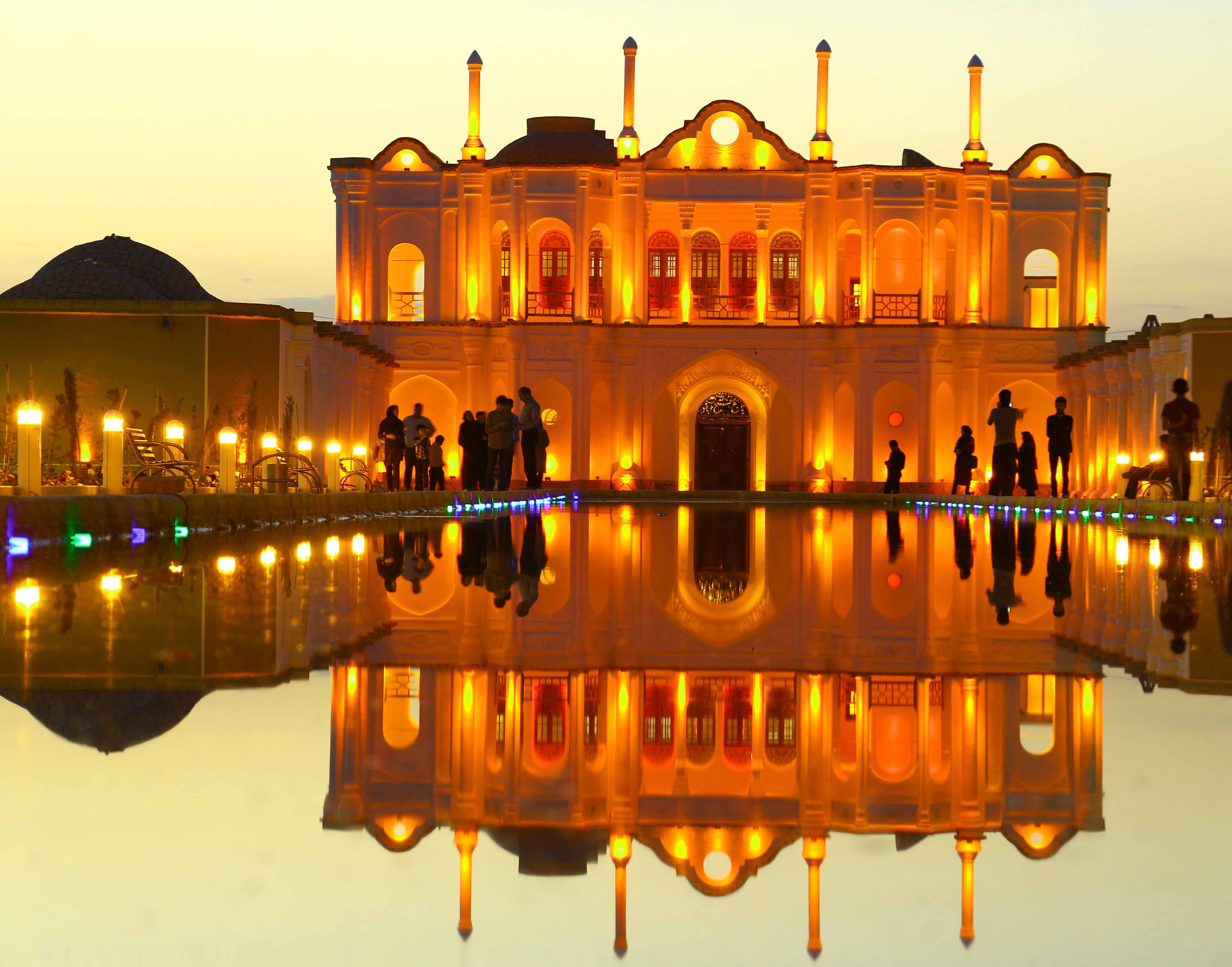
Fathabad Garden
