= Zahreh =

City in Khuzestan province, Iran

Zahreh Persian: زهره
- City
- Location within Iran
- Coordinates: 30°28′08″N 49°41′03″E
- Country: Iran
- Province: Khuzestan
- County: Hendijan
- District: Cham Khalaf-e Isa

Population (2016)
  - Total: 1,192
- Time zone: UTC+3:30 (IRST)

Zahreh (Persian: زهره) (Note: Also romanized as Zohreh, formerly Cham Khalaf-e Isa (چم خلف عیسی)) is a city in, and the capital of, Cham Khalaf-e Isa District of Hendijan County, Khuzestan province, Iran. It is also the administrative center for Cham Khalaf-e Isa Rural District.

== Demographics ==
=== Population ===
At the time of the 2006 National Census, the city's population was 1,282 in 267 households. The following census in 2011 counted 1,277 people in 297 households. The 2016 census measured the population of the city as 1,192 people in 325 households.
