= Gulashkird =

Medieval town in present-day Kerman Province, Iran

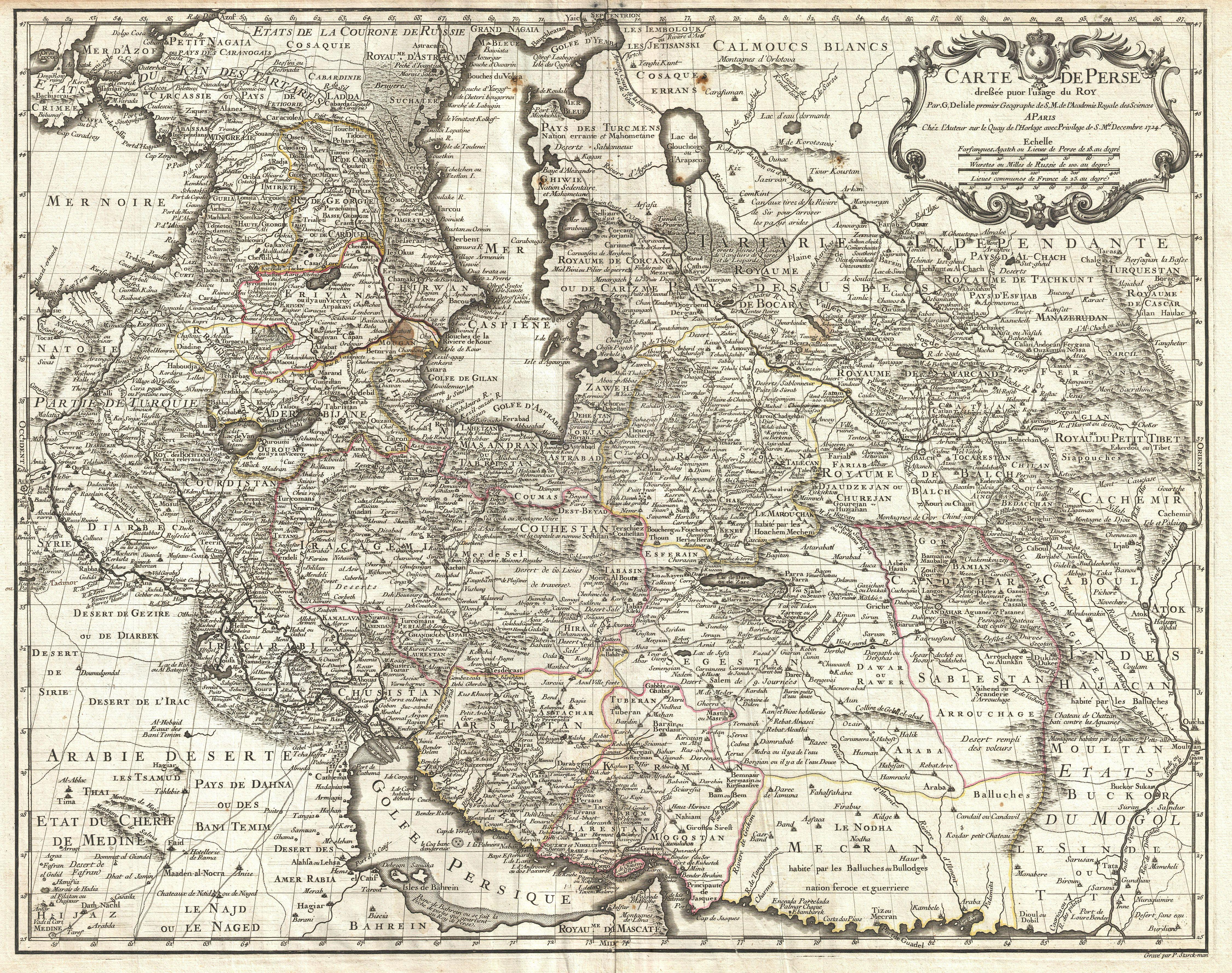
Map of Persia 1724

Gulashkird also known as Faryjab or Paryjab or Valashgird was an important town in Kerman province of Iran during the Middle Ages as a station on the trade routes from the Persian Gulf and Persia to India and also into Central Asia.

Today the town lies at modern Faryjab, a small village north east of Bandar Abbas, south of Jiroft and 50 km north of Mantijan, near the town of Manujan and the Rudkhanah i Duzdi River.

Historically the town was a strongly fortified town with a castle known as Kftshah and was serviced by quanats that allowed the area to grow Indigo, oranges, date palms and Grain, It was mentioned by Arab geographers Mukaddasi and Yaqut al-Hamawi and Marco Polo.

The village has been suggested as a possible location for the lost city of Alexandria Carmania, founded by Alexander the Great months before he died in Babylon. Indeed, Greek pottery has been found in the area.
