= Rudkhanah-i-Duzdi =

- Location within Iran
- Coordinates: 26°31′27″N 57°08′33″E
- Country: Iran
- Province: Hormozgan
- County: Minab/Jiroft County
- Time zone: UTC+3:30 (IRST)
  - Summer (DST): UTC+4:30 (IRDT)

Rudkhanah-i-Duzdi also known as the Nahr-az-Zankan River was a river in Medieval southern Persia. Mentioned by Marco Polo, Istakhri and by Yaqut al-Hamawi Its name means River of Robbers.

Rudkhanah-i-Duzdi was also the name of a village on the river with about 500 inhabitants, known in colonial times. It is in the Jiroft area, possibly a tributary of the Minab River.
