= Hendijan =

City in Khuzestan province, Iran

Hendijan Persian: هنديجان
- City
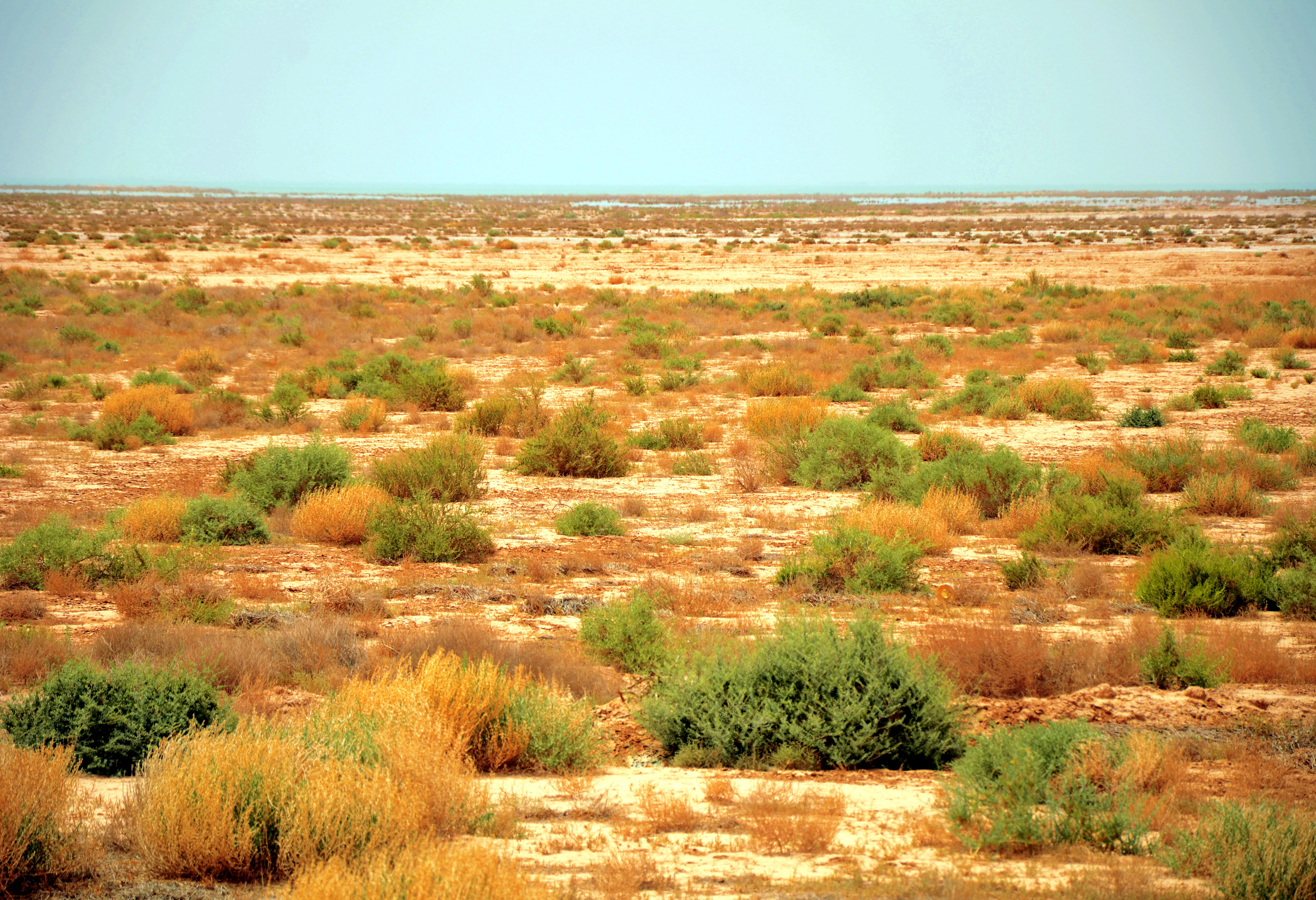
- Nickname: بعض معشور
- Location within Iran
- Coordinates: 30°14′18″N 49°42′27″E
- Country: Iran
- Province: Khuzestan
- County: Hendijan
- District: Central

Population (2016)
  - Total: 29,015
- Time zone: UTC+3:30 (IRST)

Hendijan (Persian: هندیجان) (Note: Also romanized as Hendījān; also known as Andīgān, Hendiun, Hendīān, and Hendīgān) is a city in the Central District of Hendijan County, Khuzestan province, Iran, serving as capital of both the county and the district.

== Demographics ==
=== Population ===
At the time of the 2006 National Census, the city's population was 25,100 in 5,054 households. The following census in 2011 counted 26,929 people in 6,255 households. The 2016 census measured the population of the city as 29,015 people in 7,904 households.

== Climate ==
Climate data for Hendijan (2000-2005 normals)
Month	Jan	Feb	Mar	Apr	May	Jun	Jul	Aug	Sep	Oct	Nov	Dec	Year
Daily mean °C (°F)	13.2 (55.8)	15.1 (59.2)	19.9 (67.8)	25.2 (77.4)	31.7 (89.1)	35.0 (95.0)	36.9 (98.4)	36.4 (97.5)	32.6 (90.7)	28.3 (82.9)	19.9 (67.8)	15.1 (59.2)	25.8 (78.4)
Average precipitation mm (inches)	70.9 (2.79)	8.7 (0.34)	20.9 (0.82)	18.4 (0.72)	0.7 (0.03)	0.0 (0.0)	0.0 (0.0)	0.0 (0.0)	0.0 (0.0)	0.4 (0.02)	21.6 (0.85)	111.4 (4.39)	253 (9.96)
