= Alexandria Carmania =

Alexandria Carmania Αλεξάνδρεια η εν Καρμανία
- City
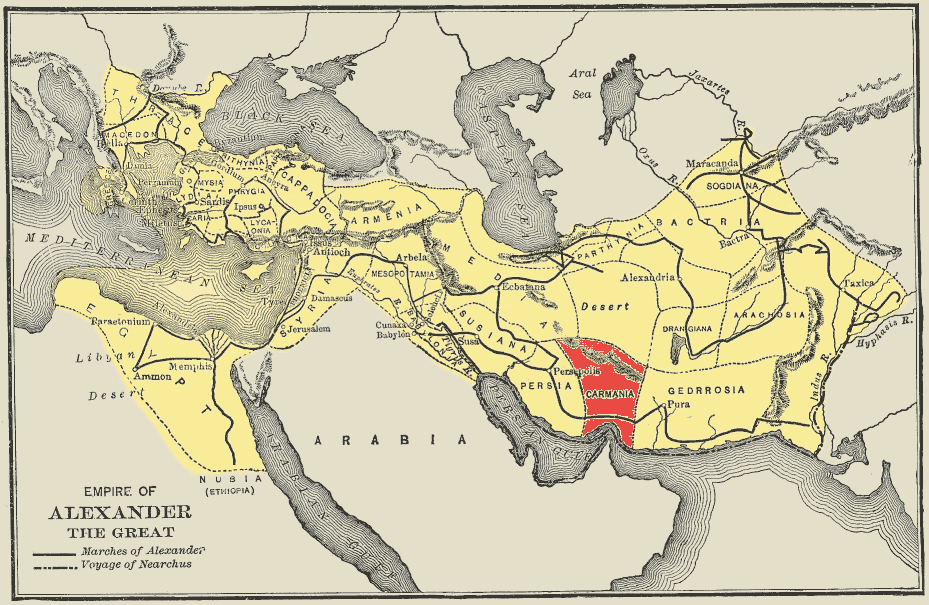
- The area of Carmania where the Alexandria Carmania was located, noted with red colour on the map of the Empire of Alexander the Great
- Country: Iran
- Established: January 324 BC
- Founder: Alexander the Great

Alexandria Carmania (Greek: Αλεξάνδρεια η εν Καρμανία, Alexandreia hē en Karmania) was one of the seventy-plus cities founded or renamed by Alexander the Great.

The town was founded by Alexander in January 324 BC after his army had reunited with Nearchus and his men who had beached their boats near the mouth of the Minab River.

== Location ==
The exact site of the city in Carmania is still unknown but several locations have been proposed:

- The most commonly cited location is the village of Gulashkird, Iran (Lat. 27° 56' 57"N Long. 57° 17' 57"E)
- The unexplored ruins to the north and northwest of Gulishkird.

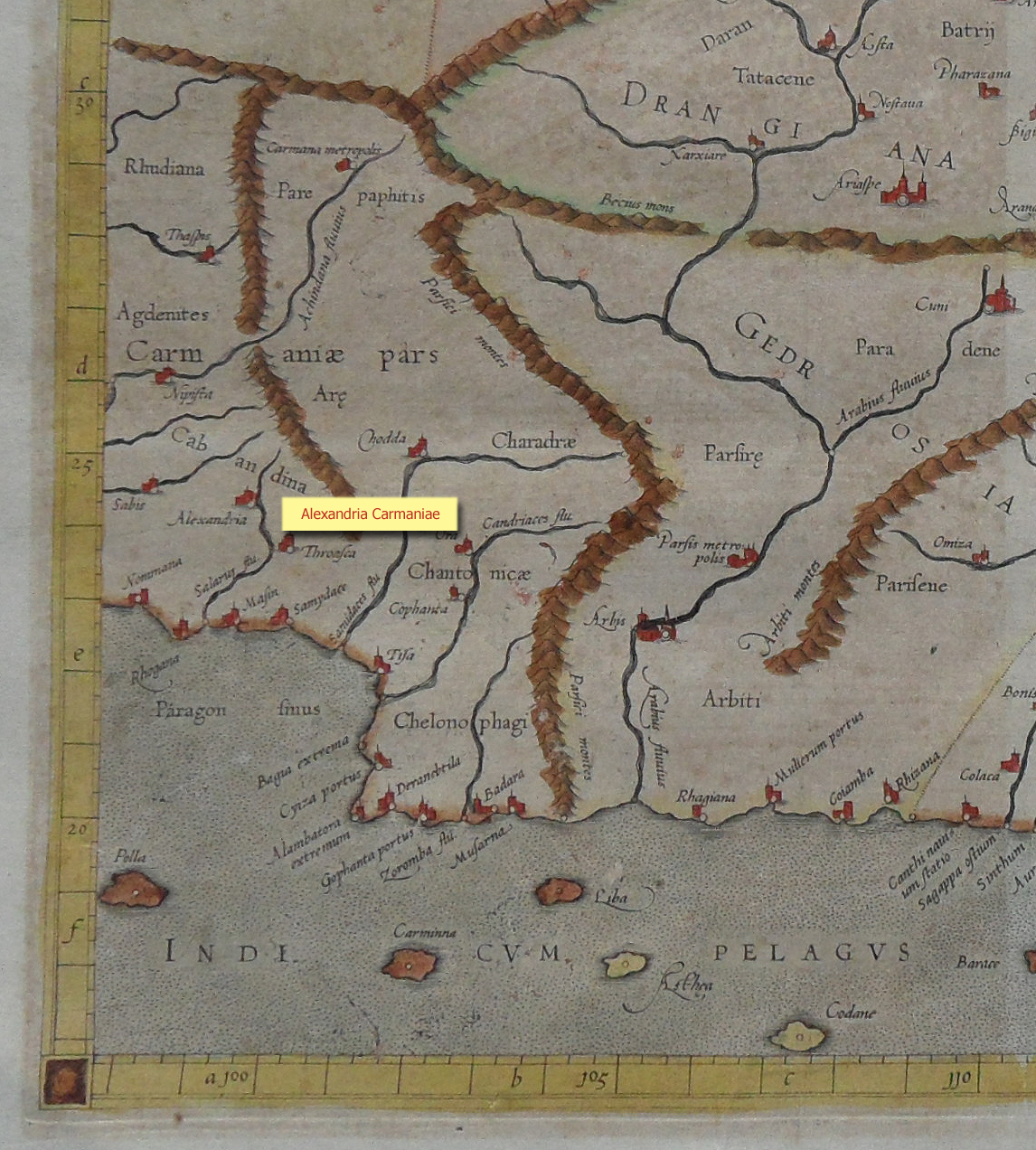
Mercator 1569 world map showing Alexandria.

- The village of Gav Koshi nearby to the east of Gulishkird has also been popular.
- Sykes says it was in Rudbar 5km north of Gulishkird, based on surface finds of Greek pottery he made in that location.
- A less likely option is the village of Shahr-i Dakyanus (Town of the emperor Decius) near Jiroft, Iran.
- Sites at Sirjan and Tepe Yahya have also been postulated.
- Fraser, taking a typically conservative position thinks that Alexandria in Carmainai never existed.
- The 1569 world map of Gerardus Mercator, taken from Ptolemy's second century world map, shows Alexandria Carmania further to the west on the Salarus River, in the arid area north of the modern town of Haregī, Iran.

The main contenders are all within a few kilometres of each other and that area would seem a logical one. Provided with reliable water from the Minab river, the location was on the convergence of the main passes from Afghanistan, the route into Gedrosia and had good access to the nearby Indian Ocean ports at Hormosia. The location would also provide control of the arable parts of Carmania.

The city still existed in the medieval period being known as Camadi, when Marco Polo visited. If Galashkird is the now lost city it was described by Arab geographer Mukaddasi who described it as "a strongly fortified town with a castle Kushah," and lush orchards and fields supported by extensive qanat irrigation.

== See also ==
- List of cities founded by Alexander the Great
