= Cham Konar, Dezful =

Cham Konar چم كنار
- Village
- Location within Iran
- Coordinates: 32°53′57″N 49°01′08″E
- Country: Iran
- Province: Khuzestan
- County: Dezful
- Bakhsh: Sardasht
- Rural District: Darreh Kayad

Population (2006)
  - Total: 83
- Time zone: UTC+3:30 (IRST)
  - Summer (DST): UTC+4:30 (IRDT)

Cham Konar (Persian: چم كنار, also Romanized as Cham Konār) is a village in Darreh Kayad Rural District, Sardasht District, Dezful County, Khuzestan Province, Iran. At the 2006 census, its population was 83, in 15 families.
