= Deh Molla, Razavi Khorasan =

Deh Molla ده ملا
- Village
- Location within Iran
- Coordinates: 35°58′27″N 59°14′08″E
- Country: Iran
- Province: Razavi Khorasan
- County: Mashhad
- Bakhsh: Ahmadabad
- Rural District: Piveh Zhan

Population (2006)
  - Total: 65
- Time zone: UTC+3:30 (IRST)
  - Summer (DST): UTC+4:30 (IRDT)

Deh Molla (Persian: ده ملا, also Romanized as Deh Mollā) is a village in Piveh Zhan Rural District, Ahmadabad District, Mashhad County, Razavi Khorasan Province, Iran. At the 2006 census, its population was 65, in 19 families.
