= Safaiyeh, Kermanshah =

Safaiyeh صفائيه
- Village
- Location within Iran
- Coordinates: 34°45′35″N 47°30′00″E
- Country: Iran
- Province: Kermanshah
- County: Sonqor
- Bakhsh: Central
- Rural District: Sarab

Population (2006)
  - Total: 357
- Time zone: UTC+3:30 (IRST)
  - Summer (DST): UTC+4:30 (IRDT)

Safaiyeh (Persian: صفائيه, also Romanized as Şafā'īyeh; also known as Shāh Godār and Shāhgudār) is a village in Sarab Rural District, in the Central District of Sonqor County, Kermanshah Province, Iran. At the 2006 census, its population was 357, in 89 families.
