= Kani Sharif =

Kani Sharif كاني شريف
- Village
- Location within Iran
- Coordinates: 34°33′32″N 46°46′58″E
- Country: Iran
- Province: Kermanshah
- County: Ravansar
- Bakhsh: Central
- Rural District: Hasanabad

Population (2006)
  - Total: 221
- Time zone: UTC+3:30 (IRST)
  - Summer (DST): UTC+4:30 (IRDT)

Kani Sharif (Persian: كاني شريف, also Romanized as Kānī Sharīf; also known as Şafā’īyeh and Shāh Godār) is a village in Hasanabad Rural District, in the Central District of Ravansar County, Kermanshah Province, Iran. At the 2006 census, its population was 221, in 51 families.
