= Deh-e Molla, Kerman =

Deh-e Molla ده ملا
- Village
- Location within Iran
- Coordinates: 30°23′30″N 57°17′45″E
- Country: Iran
- Province: Kerman
- County: Kerman
- Bakhsh: Central
- Rural District: Derakhtengan

Population (2016)
  - Total: 138
- Time zone: UTC+3:30 (IRST)
  - Summer (DST): UTC+4:30 (IRDT)

Deh-e Molla (Persian: ده ملا, also Romanized as Deh-e Mollā and Deh Mollā) is a village in Derakhtengan Rural District, in the Central District of Kerman County, Kerman Province, Iran. At the 2017 census Bureau of Iran in 2016, its population was 112 peoples in 38 Families.
