= Deh Molla, Markazi =

Deh Molla ده ملا
- Village
- Location within Iran
- Coordinates: 33°38′45″N 49°42′14″E
- Country: Iran
- Province: Markazi
- County: Khomeyn
- Bakhsh: Kamareh
- Rural District: Chahar Cheshmeh

Population (2006)
  - Total: 15
- Time zone: UTC+3:30 (IRST)
  - Summer (DST): UTC+4:30 (IRDT)

Deh Molla (Persian: ده ملا, also Romanized as Deh Mollā; also known as Mollā) is a village in Chahar Cheshmeh Rural District, Kamareh District, Khomeyn County, Markazi Province, Iran. At the 2006 census, its population was 15, in 5 families.
