= Rudbar, Rabor =

Rudbar رودبر
- Village
- Location within Iran
- Coordinates: 29°16′47″N 56°57′38″E
- Country: Iran
- Province: Kerman
- County: Rabor
- Bakhsh: Central
- Rural District: Rabor

Population (2006)
  - Total: 420
- Time zone: UTC+3:30 (IRST)

Rudbar (Persian: رودبر, also Romanized as Rūdbar; also known as Deh-e Rūd Bār, Deh Rūdeh, Roodar’ieyh, and Rūdar) is a village in Rabor Rural District, in the Central District of Rabor County, Kerman Province, Iran (at 29°16'48" north and 56°57'36" east). At the 2006 census, its population was 420, in 106 families.

General Percy Sykes found Greek pottery and coins at Rudbar.
