= Cham Konar, Shushtar =

Cham Konar چمكنار
- Village
- Location within Iran
- Coordinates: 31°58′50″N 48°53′06″E
- Country: Iran
- Province: Khuzestan
- County: Shushtar
- Bakhsh: Central
- Rural District: Shahid Modarres

Population (2006)
  - Total: 257
- Time zone: UTC+3:30 (IRST)
  - Summer (DST): UTC+4:30 (IRDT)

Cham Konar (Persian: چمكنار, also Romanized as Cham Konār) is a village in Shahid Modarres Rural District, in the Central District of Shushtar County, Khuzestan Province, Iran. At the 2006 census, its population was 257, in 48 families.
