= Deh-e Mowla =

Deh-e Mowla ده مولا
- Village
- Location within Iran
- Coordinates: 33°47′24″N 49°07′21″E
- Country: Iran
- Province: Markazi
- County: Shazand
- Bakhsh: Sarband
- Rural District: Malmir

Population (2006)
  - Total: 105
- Time zone: UTC+3:30 (IRST)
  - Summer (DST): UTC+4:30 (IRDT)

Deh-e Mowla (Persian: ده مولا, also Romanized as Deh-e Mowlā, Deh Maula, and Deh Mowlā; also known as Deh-e Mollā) is a village in Malmir Rural District, Sarband District, Shazand County, Markazi Province, Iran. At the 2006 census, its population was 105, in 32 families.
