= Minab River =

- Location within Iran
- Coordinates: 26°30′20″N 57°07′19″E
- Country: Iran
- Province: Hormozgan
- County: Minab
- Bakhsh: Byaban
- Time zone: UTC+3:30 (IRST)
  - Summer (DST): UTC+4:30 (IRDT)

The Minab River is a river in Hormozgan province, and Sistan and Baluchestan, Iran, near Harmosia.

This river is formed by adjoining of two smaller rivers, the Roudan and Joqeen. These two rivers meet near the village of Borjegan, 25 km south east of Minab city and the river empties into the Strait of Hormuz at Sirik, Iran. Here there is a flourishing Mangrove ecosystem.

Minab River

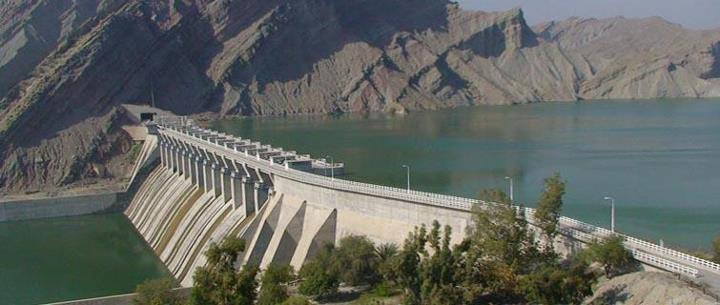
Minab reservoir.

The river has a dam 2 km from Minab.

In ancient times, the Minab was the site of Alexandria Carmania, a Greek Colony founded by Alexander the Great in January 324B.C. after his army had reunited with Nearchus and his men who had beached their boats near the mouth of the Minab River, which was then called Anamis or Saganos.
