= Hendijan-e Gharbi Rural District =

Rural district in Khuzestan province, Iran

Hendijan-e Gharbi Rural District Persian: دهستان هندیجان غربی
- Rural District
- Location within Iran
- Coordinates: 30°13′44″N 49°37′17″E
- Country: Iran
- Province: Khuzestan
- County: Hendijan
- District: Central
- Capital: Hoseynabad

Population (2016)
  - Total: 1,165
- Time zone: UTC+3:30 (IRST)

Hendijan-e Gharbi Rural District (Persian: دهستان هندیجان غربی) is in the Central District of Hendijan County, Khuzestan province, Iran. Its capital is the village of Hoseynabad.

== Demographics ==
=== Population ===
At the time of the 2006 National Census, the rural district's population was 1,136 in 233 households. There were 1,313 inhabitants in 318 households at the following census of 2011. The 2016 census measured the population of the rural district as 1,165 in 313 households. The most populous of its 25 villages was Hoseynabad, with 338 people.
