= Mazun (historical region) =

Province of the Sasanian Empire

- Province of the Sasanian Empire
- 240–628
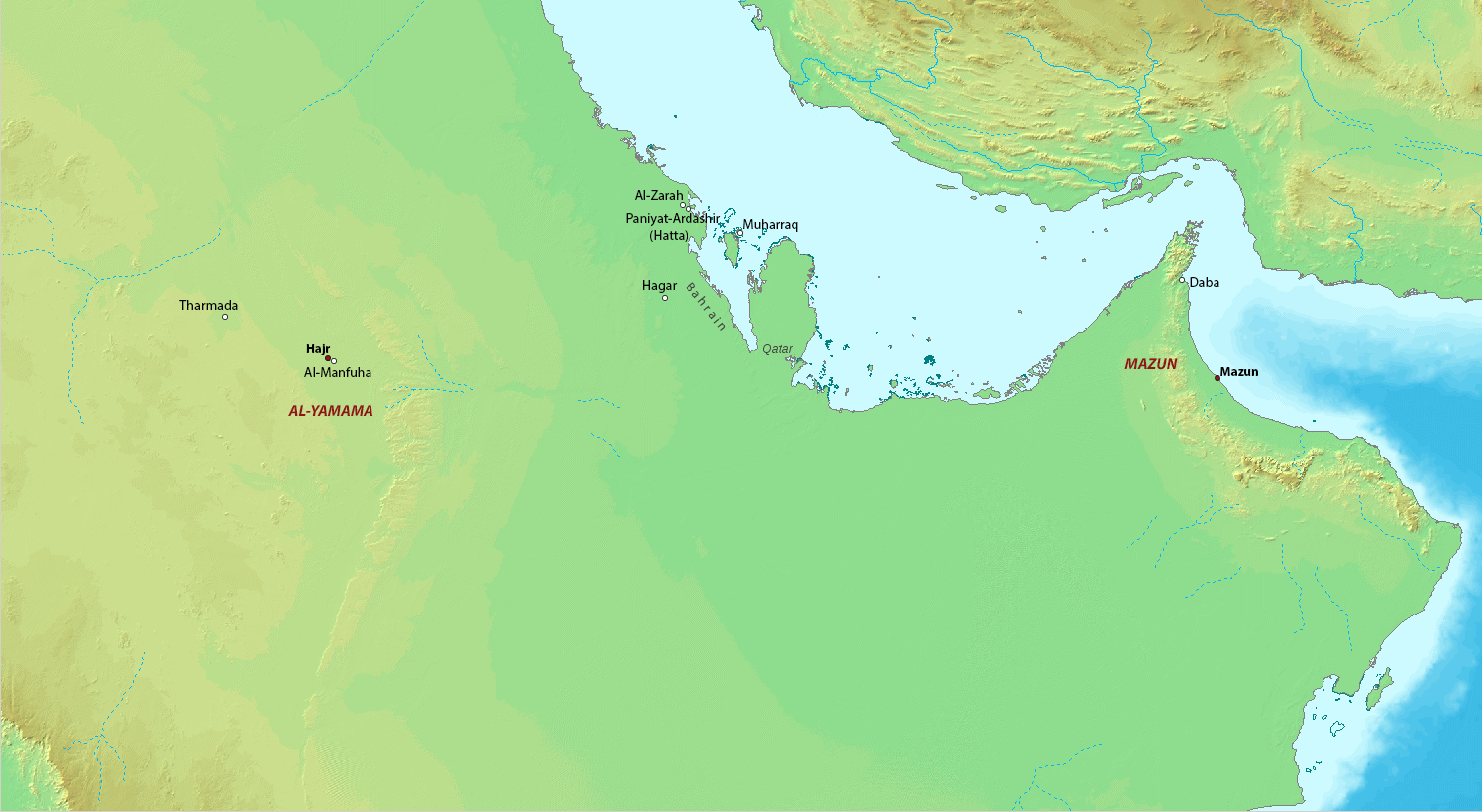
- Map of eastern and central Arabia in the 6th-century. By this period, the Sasanians had extended their authority over al-Yamama through their Lakhmid vassals.
- Capital: Mazun
- Historical era: Antiquity
  - Conquest of Eastern Arabia by Ardashir I: 240
  - Mazun is incorporated into the political system of Islamic Medina: 628
Succeeded by
First Islamic State

Mazun was a Sasanian province in Late Antiquity, which corresponded to modern-day Bahrain, Qatar, United Arab Emirates, and the northern half of Oman. The province served as a Sasanian outpost and played an important role in the Sasanian efforts to gain control over the Indian Ocean trade, and to establish their dominance in the wealthy regions of Hadramaut and Yemen.

In the 6th-century, the province was ruled by the clients and allies of the Sasanians, the Lakhmids.

== History ==
Eastern Arabia was in c. 240 conquered by Ardashir I (r. 224–242), who made it into the province of Mazun. According to the 8th-century Šahrestānīhā ī Ērānšahr, Ardashir appointed a certain Oshag of Hagar as marzban (general of a frontier province, "margrave") over the "Do-sar and Borg-gil by the wall of the Arabs." He also deported the prominent Azd tribe from Oman to Shihr on the Hadhramaut coast. During the childhood of shah Shapur II (r. 309–379), Arab nomads made several incursions into the Sasanian homeland of Pars, where they raided Gor and its surroundings. Furthermore, they also made incursions into Meshan and Mazun. At the age of 16, Shapur II led an expedition against the Arabs; primarily campaigning against the Iyad tribe in Asoristan and thereafter he crossed the Persian Gulf, reaching eastern Arabia. He proceeded to attack the Banu Tamim in the Al Hajar Mountains. Shapur II reportedly killed a large number of the Arab population and destroyed their water supplies by stopping their wells with sand.

After having dealt with the Arabs of eastern Arabia, he continued his expedition into western Arabia and Syria, where he attacked several cities—he even went as far as Medina. Because of his cruel way of dealing with the Arabs, he was called Dhū l-Aktāf "he who pierces shoulders" by them. Not only did Shapur II pacify the Arabs of the Persian Gulf, but he also pushed many Arab tribes further deep into the Arabian Peninsula. Furthermore, he also deported some Arab tribes by force; the Taghlib to Bahrain and Hatta; the Banu Abdul Qays and Banu Tamim to Hagar; the Banu Bakr to Kirman, and the Banu Hanzalah to a place near Hormizd-Ardashir. Sasanian garrisons were established in Oman's strategic coast in Al Batinah Region, including the tip of the Musandam Peninsula, Sohar, and Rustaq. Shapur II, in order to prevent the Arabs from making more raids into his country, ordered the construction of a wall near al-Hirah, which became known as war-i tāzigān ("wall of the Arabs").

With Eastern Arabia more firmly under Sasanian control, and with the establishment of Sasanian garrison troops, the way for Zoroastrianism was opened. Pre-Islamic Arabian poets often makes mention of Zoroastrianism practices, which they must have either made contact with in Asoristan or Eastern Arabia. In c. 531/2, shah Khosrow I (r. 531–579) appointed the Lakhmid king al-Mundhir III ibn al-Nu'man as the ruler of Mazun.

A late Sasanian fort is recently excavated in Fulayj, Oman.

== Sources ==
- al-Jahwari, Nasser Said; Kennet, Derek; Priestman, Seth; Sauer, Eberhard (2018). "Fulayj: a Late Sasanian fort on the Arabian coast" (PDF). Antiquity. 92 (363): 724–741. doi:10.15184/aqy.2018.64. ISSN 0003-598X. S2CID 166200082.
- Zakeri, Mohsen (1995). Sasanid Soldiers in Early Muslim Society: The Origins of 'Ayyārān and Futuwwa. Otto Harrassowitz Verlag. pp. 1–391. ISBN 978-3447036528.
- Bosworth, C. E. (1983). "Abnāʾ". Encyclopaedia Iranica, Vol. I, Fasc. 3. pp. 226–228.
- Brunner, Christopher (1983). "Geographical and Administrative divisions: Settlements and Economy". The Cambridge History of Iran: The Seleucid, Parthian, and Sasanian periods (2). Cambridge: Cambridge University Press. pp. 747–778. ISBN 978-0-521-24693-4.
- Bosworth, C.E. (1975). "Iran and the Arabs before Islam". The Cambridge History of Iran, Volume 3 (1): The Seleucid, Parthian and Sasanian periods. Cambridge: Cambridge University Press. pp. 593–613. ISBN 978-0-521-20093-6.
- Daryaee, Touraj (July 20, 2009a). "ŠĀPUR II". Encyclopaedia Iranica.
- Daryaee, Touraj (2009b). Sasanian Persia: The Rise and Fall of an Empire. I.B.Tauris. pp. 1–240. ISBN 978-0857716668.
- Frye, R. N. (1983). "The Political History of Iran under the Sassanians". In Yarshater, Ehsan (ed.). Cambridge History of Iran. Vol. 3. London: Cambridge University Press. pp. 116–181.
- Potts, Daniel T. (2012). "ARABIA ii. The Sasanians and Arabia". Encyclopaedia Iranica.
- Sauer, Eberhard (2017). Sauer, Eberhard (ed.). Sasanian Persia: Between Rome and the Steppes of Eurasia. Edinburgh University Press. pp. 1–336.
- Omar, Farouk (1987). "Urban Centres in the Gulf during the Early Islamic Period: A Historical Study". Bulletin (British Society for Middle Eastern Studies). 14 (2): 156–161. doi:10.1080/13530198808705462. JSTOR 194381.
