= Cham Khalaf-e Isa Rural District =

Rural district in Khuzestan province, Iran

Cham Khalaf-e Isa Rural District Persian: دهستان چم خلف عیسی
- Rural District
- Location within Iran
- Coordinates: 30°26′15″N 49°42′12″E
- Country: Iran
- Province: Khuzestan
- County: Hendijan
- District: Cham Khalaf-e Isa
- Capital: Zahreh

Population (2016)
  - Total: 2,524
- Time zone: UTC+3:30 (IRST)

Cham Khalaf-e Isa Rural District (Persian: دهستان چم خلف عیسی) is in Cham Khalaf-e Isa District of Hendijan County, Khuzestan province, Iran. It is administered from the city of Zahreh. (Note: Formerly the village of Cham Khalaf-e Isa)

== Demographics ==
=== Population ===
At the time of the 2006 National Census, the rural district's population was 2,701 in 515 households. There were 2,693 inhabitants in 644 households at the following census of 2011. The 2016 census measured the population of the rural district as 2,524 in 695 households. The most populous of its 16 villages was Karimabad, with 566 people.
