= Soviren Rural District =

Rural district in Khuzestan province, Iran

Soviren Rural District Persian: دهستان سورين
- Rural District
- Location within Iran
- Coordinates: 30°31′29″N 49°40′48″E
- Country: Iran
- Province: Khuzestan
- County: Hendijan
- District: Cham Khalaf-e Isa
- Capital: Soveyreh

Population (2016)
  - Total: 2,934
- Time zone: UTC+3:30 (IRST)

Soviren Rural District (Persian: دهستان سورين) is in Cham Khalaf-e Isa District of Hendijan County, Khuzestan province, Iran. Its capital is the village of Soveyreh.

== Demographics ==
=== Population ===
At the time of the 2006 National Census, the rural district's population was 3,234 in 642 households. There were 2,964 inhabitants in 771 households at the following census of 2011. The 2016 census measured the population of the rural district as 2,934 in 836 households. The most populous of its 14 villages was Deh-e Molla Bozorg, with 874 people.
