= Hendijan-e Sharqi Rural District =

Rural district in Khuzestan province, Iran

Hendijan-e Sharqi Rural District Persian: دهستان هندیجان شرقی
- Rural District
- Location within Iran
- Coordinates: 30°11′53″N 49°51′09″E
- Country: Iran
- Province: Khuzestan
- County: Hendijan
- District: Central
- Capital: Chehel Mani

Population (2016)
  - Total: 1,932
- Time zone: UTC+3:30 (IRST)

Hendijan-e Sharqi Rural District (Persian: دهستان هندیجان شرقی) (Note: Formerly Hendijan Rural District (دهستان هندیجان)) is in the Central District of Hendijan County, Khuzestan province, Iran. Its capital is the village of Chehel Mani.

== Demographics ==
=== Population ===
At the time of the 2006 National Census, the rural district's population was 2,479 in 516 households. There were 2,264 inhabitants in 593 households at the following census of 2011. The 2016 census measured the population of the rural district as 1,932 in 563 households. The most populous of its 21 villages was Emamzadeh Abdollah, with 616 people.
