= Central District (Hendijan County) =

District in Khuzestan province, Iran

Central District (Hendijan County) Persian: بخش مرکزی شهرستان هندیجان
- District
- Location within Iran
- Coordinates: 30°11′53″N 49°50′17″E
- Country: Iran
- Province: Khuzestan
- County: Hendijan
- Capital: Hendijan

Population (2016)
  - Total: 32,112
- Time zone: UTC+3:30 (IRST)

The Central District of Hendijan County (Persian: بخش مرکزی شهرستان هندیجان) is in Khuzestan province, Iran. Its capital is the city of Hendijan.

== Demographics ==
=== Population ===
At the time of the 2006 National Census, the district's population was 28,715 in 5,803 households. The following census in 2011 counted 30,506 people in 7,166 households. The 2016 census measured the population of the district as 32,112 inhabitants in 8,780 households.

=== Administrative divisions ===
Central District (Hendijan County) Population
Administrative Divisions	2006	2011	2016
Hendijan-e Gharbi RD	1,136	1,313	1,165
Hendijan-e Sharqi RD (Note: Formerly Hendijan Rural District)	2,479	2,264	1,932
Hendijan (city)	25,100	26,929	29,015
Total	28,715	30,506	32,112
RD = Rural District
