= Cham Khalaf-e Isa District =

District in Khuzestan province, Iran

Cham Khalaf-e Isa District Persian: بخش چم خلف عیسی
- District
- Location within Iran
- Coordinates: 30°28′55″N 49°42′12″E
- Country: Iran
- Province: Khuzestan
- County: Hendijan
- Capital: Zahreh

Population (2016)
  - Total: 6,650
- Time zone: UTC+3:30 (IRST)

Cham Khalaf-e Isa District (Persian: بخش چم خلف عیسی) is in Hendijan County, Khuzestan province, Iran. Its capital is the city of Zahreh.

== Demographics ==
=== Population ===
At the time of the 2006 National Census, the district's population was 7,217 in 1,424 households. The following census in 2011 counted 6,934 people in 1,712 households. The 2016 census measured the population of the district as 6,650 inhabitants in 1,856 households.

=== Administrative divisions ===
Cham Khalaf-e Isa District Population
Administrative Divisions	2006	2011	2016
Cham Khalaf-e Isa RD	2,701	2,693	2,524
Soviren RD	3,234	2,964	2,934
Zahreh (city) (Note: Formerly the village of Cham Khalaf-e Isa)	1,282	1,277	1,192
Total	7,217	6,934	6,650
RD = Rural District
