= Hendijan County =

County in Khuzestan province, Iran

Hendijan County Persian: شهرستان هندیجان
- County
- Location of Hendijan County in Khuzestan province (bottom right, pink)

- Location of Khuzestan province in Iran
- Coordinates: 30°18′N 49°51′E
- Country: Iran
- Province: Khuzestan
- Capital: Hendijan
- Districts: Central, Cham Khalaf-e Isa

Population (2016)
  - Total: 38,762
- Time zone: UTC+3:30 (IRST)

Hendijan County (Persian: شهرستان هندیجان) is in Khuzestan province, Iran. Its capital is the city of Hendijan. Hendijan County is located in the southeast of Iran and is connected to Persian Gulf through Zohreh River.

== History ==
The name of this area was "Hendigan" after Islam entered Iran, because of its vicinity to the Persian Gulf.

According to archaeological documents, this area was a residential area on the edge of Hendijan River around 10,000 years BCE.

Some earthenware also prove civilization in lower part of Hendijan River in the vicinity of the Persian Gulf related to Arsacid Empire era.

Some earthenware famous as Chinese earthenware has been found in the historical harbor called Mahi Rouban in the vicinity of Hendijan related to the Ashkaniyan era.

== Demographics ==
=== Population ===
At the time of the 2006 National Census, the county's population was 35,932 in 7,227 households. The following census in 2011 counted 37,440 people in 8,873 households. The 2016 census measured the population of the county as 38,762 in 10,636 households.

=== Administrative divisions ===
Hendijan County's population history and administrative structure over three consecutive censuses are shown in the following table.

Hendijan County Population
Administrative Divisions	2006	2011	2016
Central District	28,715	30,506	32,112
Hendijan-e Gharbi RD	1,136	1,313	1,165
Hendijan-e Sharqi RD (Note: Formerly Hendijan Rural District)	2,479	2,264	1,932
Hendijan (city)	25,100	26,929	29,015
Cham Khalaf-e Isa District	7,217	6,934	6,650
Cham Khalaf-e Isa RD	2,701	2,693	2,524
Soviren RD	3,234	2,964	2,934
Zahreh (city) (Note: Formerly the village of Cham Khalaf-e Isa)	1,282	1,277	1,192
Total	35,932	37,440	38,762
RD = Rural District

== See also ==
Media related to Hendijan County at Wikimedia Commons
