= Patrologia Orientalis =

Collection of the writings by eastern Church Fathers

The Patrologia Orientalis is an attempt to create a comprehensive collection of the writings by eastern Church Fathers in Syriac, Armenian, Arabic, Coptic, Ge'ez, Georgian, and Slavonic, published with a Latin, English, Italian or mostly French translation. It is designed to complement the comprehensive, influential, and monumental Latin and Greek patrologies published in the 19th century. It began in 1897 as the Patrologia Syriaca, was discontinued in its original form and replaced by the Patrologia Orientalis. The collection began with those liturgical texts that touch on hagiography. Since then critical editions of the Bible, theological works, homilies and letters have been published.

The edition is ongoing. Editors were René Graffin, (d. 1941); François Nau (d. 1931); Max, Prince of Saxony (d. 1951) and from 1951 François Graffin. Volume 1 was published in 1904, and 1984 saw the publication of volume 41.

== Volumes ==
=== Volume 1. 1904. 705 p. ===
- I. The Book of the Mysteries of Heaven and Earth / Ethiopian text and French translation by J. Perruchon
- II. History of the Patriarchs of the Coptic Church of Alexandria, Part I: S. Mark to Benjamin I, traditionally ascribed to Severus of Hermopolis, Arabic text edited, translated, and annotated by Basil Thomas Alfred Evetts.
- III. The Jacobite Arab Synaxarium (Coptic Edition) / Arab text and translation into French by René Basset
- IV. The Ethiopian Synaxarium: The months of Sanê, Hamlê and Nahasê, translated into French by Ignazio Guidi. I, Mois de Sanê

=== Volume 2. 1907. 688 p. ===
Text in Coptic, Ethiopic, Greek, Latin and Syrian

- I - Vie de Sévère d'Antioche, par Zacharie le scholastique,
- II - Les apocryphes coptes: Les évangiles des douze apôtres et de saint Barthélemy / E. Revillout,
- III - Vie de Sévère, par Jean, supérieur du monastère de Beith Aphthonia / M.A. Kugener,
- IV - Les versions grecques des actes des martyrs persans sous Sapor II / Hippolyte Delehaye S.J.,
- V - Le livre de Job: version éthiopienne - Francisco Maria Esteves Pereira

=== Volume 3. 1909. 646 p. ===
Text in Arabic, Ethiopic and Syriac

- I - Histoire d'Ahoudemmeh et de Marouta, métropolitains Jacobites de Tagrit et de l'Orient; traité d'Ahoudemmeh / F. Nau,
- II - Réfutations d'Eutychius, par Sévère, évêque d'Aschmounaïn / P. Chébli,
- III - Le synaxaire arabe Jacobite / René Basset,
- IV - Sargis d'Aberga, controverse Judéo-Chrétienne / S. Grébaut et I. Guidi

=== Volume 4. 1908. 725 p. ===
Text in Arabic, Ethiopic, Greek, Latin and Syriac

- I - Les "Homiliae Cathedrales" de Sévère d'Antioche. Traduction syriaque de Jacques d'Édesse; publiée et traduite. Homélies LII-LVII / Rubens Duval,
- II - Les plus anciens monuments du Christianisme écrits sur papyrus / C. Wessely,
- III - Histoire nestorienne inédite : (chronique de Séert). Première partie. (I) / Addaï Scher et J. Périer,
- IV - La cause de la fondation des écoles, par Mar Barhadbsabba `Arbaya; texte syriaque publié et traduit / Addaï Scher,
- V - Histoire de S. Pacome (une rédaction inédite des Ascetica) : texte grec des manuscrits Paris 881 et Chartres 1754 / avec une traduction de la version syriaque et une analyse du manuscrit de Paris suppl. grec 480 / J. Bousquet et F. Nau
- VI. Histoire de Saint Jean-Baptiste attribuée à Saint Marc l'évangéliste; texte grec publié avec traduction française [par F. Nau].
- VII. Le miracle de S. Michel à Colosses : (récit de Saint Archippos), texte grec publié avec l'ancienne traduction Latine, composée au Mont Athos par le moine Léon (XIe-XIIe siècle), par F. Nau
- VIII. The conflict of Severus, Patriarch of Antioch, by Athanasius; Ethiopic text edited and translated by Edgar J. Goodspeed; with the remains of the Coptic versions by W.E. Crum

=== Volume 5. 1910. 807 p. ===
Text in Arabic, Armenian and Syriac

- I. History of the Patriarchs of the Coptic Church of Alexandria, Part III: Agathon to Michael I, traditionally ascribed to Severus of Hermopolis, Arabic text edited, translated, and annotated by Basil Thomas Alfred Evetts.
- II - Histoire nestorienne : (chronique de Séert). Première partie. (II), publiée par Addaï Scher; traduite par Pierre Dib
- III - Le synaxaire arménien de Ter Israël / publié et traduit par G. Bayan; avec le concours de Max de Saxe. I, Mois de navasard
- IV - Kitab al-`unvan = Histoire universelle, écrite par Agapius (Mahboub) de Menbidj; éditée et traduite en français par Alexandre Vasiliev. Première partie (I)
- V - Les légendes syriaques d'Aaron de Saroug, de Maxime et Domèce, d'Abraham, maître de Barsoma et de l'empereur Maurice / texte syriaque édité et traduit par F. Nau. Les miracles de Saint Ptolémée / texte arabe édité et traduit par L. Leroy

=== Volume 6. 1911. 704 p. ===
Text in Arabic, Armenian, Ethiopic, Greek, Latin and Syriac

- I - The hymns of Severus and others in the Syriac version of Paul of Edessa as revised by James of Edessa / E.W. Brooks,
- II - Le synaxaire Arménien de Ter Israël. II, Mois de hori / G. Bayan,
- III - Les trois derniers traités du livre des mystères du ciel et de la terre. texte éthiopien publié et traduit / S. Grébaut,
- IV - L'histoire des conciles de Sévère ibn al Moqaffa (second livre) / L. Leroy et S. Grébaut,
- V - Vie d'Alexandre l'Acémète. texte grec et traduction latine / E. de Stoop

=== Volume 7. 1911. 802 p. ===
Text in Arabic, Coptic, and Syriac

- I - Traités d'Isaï le docteur et de Hnana d'Abiabène sur les martyrs, le vendredi d'or et les rogations, et de foi a réciter par les évéques nestoriens avant l'ordination / Addaï Scher,
- II - Histoire nestorienne (Chronique de Séert). Seconde partie (I) / Addaï Scher,
- III - Le synaxaire Éthiopien: les mois de sanê, hamlê et nahasê / I. Guidi,
- IV - Kitab al-'Unvan = Histoire universelle / écrite par Agapius (Mahboub) de Menbidj; editée et traduite en français. Seconde partie. (I)/ A.A. Vasiliev,
- V - The hymns of Severus and others in the Syriac version of Paul of Edessa as revised by James of Edessa (II) / E.W. Brooks

=== Volume 8. 1912. 780 p. ===
Text in Arabic, Greek and Syriac

- I - Jean Rufus, Évëque de Maïouma - Plérophories, c'est-a-dire témoignages et révélations (contre le concile de Chalcédoine) version syriaque et traduction française / F. Nau,
- II - Les homiliae cathedrales de Sévère d'Antioche, version syriaque de Jacques d'Édesse. Homélies LVIII à LXIX, éditées et traduites en français / M. Briere,
- III - Kitab al'Unvan. Histoire universelle, écrite par Agapius de Menbidj. Seconde partie. (II) / A.A. Vasiliev,
- IV - La version arabe des 127 canons des apotres, texte arabe, en partie inédit, publié et traduit en français d'après les manuscrits de Paris, de Rome et de Londres / J. Périer et A. Périer,
- V - La didascalie de Jacob, première assemblée : texte grec, original du Sargis d'Aberga (P. O., III, 4) / F. Nau

=== Volume 9. 1913. 677 p. ===
Text in Coptic, Ethiopic and Syriac

- I - Le livre d'Esther, version éthiopienne / Francisco Maria Esteves Pereira,
- II - Les Apocryphes coptes: II, Acta Pilati / Dr E. Revillout,
- III - Le testament en Galilée de notre-seigner Jésus-Christ / L. Guerrier et S. Grébaut,
- IV - Le synaxaire Éthiopien: les mois de sanê, hamlê, nahasê et pâguemên / I. Guidi et S. Grébaut,
- V - La seconde partie de l'histoire ecclésiastique de Barhadbesaba 'Arbaïa et une controverse de Théodore de Mopsueste avec les Macédoniens: texte syriaque édité et traduit / F. Nau

=== Volume 10. 1915. 674 p. ===
Text in Arabic, Latin and Syriac

- I - Un martyrologie et douze Ménologes syriaques / F. Nau,
- II - Les Ménologes des Évangéliaires coptes-arabes / F. Nau,
- III - Le calendrier d'Aboul-Barakat: texte arabe, édité et traduit / Eug. Tisserant,
- IV - Les fêtes des melchites, par Al-Bîrounî; Les fêtes des coptes par Al-Maqrizi; Calendrier maronite par Ibn al-Qola'i. textes arabes édités et traduits / R. Griveau,
- V. History of the Patriarchs of the Coptic Church of Alexandria, Part IV: Mennas I to Joseph, traditionally ascribed to Severus of Hermopolis, Arabic text edited, translated, and annotated by Basil Thomas Alfred Evetts.
- VI - Ammonii Eremitae epistolae / syriace edidit et praefatus est Michael Kmoskó
- Index for tomes 1-10

=== Volume 11. 1915. 859 p. ===
Text in Arabic, Greek and Syriac

- I - Kitab al-'Unvan. Histoire universalle écrite par Agapius (Mahboub) de Menbidj. Première partie. (II) / Al. Vasiliev,
- II - La vie de saint Luc le Stylite (879-979), texte grec édité et traduit / Fr. Vanderstuyf,
- III - Histoire d'Isaac, patriarche Jacobite d'Alexandrie de 686 à 689, écrite par Mina, évêque de Pchati; texte copte édité et traduit en français / E. Porcher,
- IV - Ammonas, successeur de saint Antoine, textes grecs et syriaques édités et traduits / Fr. Nau,
- V - Le synaxaire arabe Jacobite: (rédaction copte). III, Les mois de toubeh et d'amchir. texte arabe publié, traduit et annoté / René Basset

=== Volume 12. 1919. 802 p. ===
- I - Les Homiliae cathedrales de Sévère d'Antioche: traduction syriaque de Jacques d'Édesse (suite). Homélies LXX à LXXVI, éditées et traduites en français par Maurice Brière
- II - A collection of letters of Severus of Antioch : from numerous Syriac manuscripts. edited and translated by E.W. Brooks
- III - Histoire des sultans mamlouks, par Moufazzal ibn Abil-Fazaïl; texte arabe publié et traduit en français par E. Blochet
- IV - Les miracles de Jésus. texte éthiopien publié et traduit par Sylvain Grébaut
- V - Eis epideixin tou apostolikou kerygmatos = The proof of the apostolic preaching : with seven fragments : Armenian version par S. Irenaeus; edited and translated by Karapet ter Mekerttschian and S.G. Wilson; with the co-operation of Prince Maxe of Saxony

=== Volume 13. 1919. 738 p. ===
Text in Ethiopic, French, Latin and Syriac

- I - Sargis d'Aberga, controverse Judéo chrétienne (fin). texte éthiopien publié et traduit / S. Grébaut,
- II - Documents pour servir a l'histoire de l'église Nestorienne: I. Quatre homélies de Saint Jean Chrysostome, II. Textes monophysites - Homélies d'Érechthios, Fragments divers, Extraits de Timothée Ælure, de Philoxène, de Bar Hébraeus, III. Histoire de Nestorius ..., Conjuration de Nestorius contre les migraines / textes syriaques édités et traduits / F. Nau,
- III - Logia et agrapha domini Jesu : apud Moslemicos scriptores, asceticos praesertim, usitata / collegit, vertit, notis instruxit Michaël Asin et Palacios. Fasciculus prior
- IV - Histoire nestorienne inédite : (Chronique de Séert). Seconde partie. (II) / Addai Scher et Robert Griveau,
- V - Le troisième livre d'Ezrâ (Esdras et Néhémie cononiques) : version éthiopienne, editée et traduite en français / E. Pereira

=== Volume 14. 1920. 855 p. ===
Text in Arabic, Coptic, Ethiopic and Syriac

- I - A collection of letters of Severus of Antioch, from numerous Syriac manuscripts / E.W. Brooks,
- II - The life of Abba John Kamé, Coptic text edited and translated from the Cod. Vat. Copt. LX. / M.H. Davis,
- III - Mufazzal Ibn Abil - Fazaïl. Histoire des sultans Mamlouks, texte arabe publié et traduit en français,
- IV - Sei scritti antitreistici in langua siriaca / G. Furlani,
- V - Les miracles de Jésus, texte Éthiopien publié et traduit en français / S. Grébaut
- "Index to the Letters of Severus and appendix (t. xii, fasc. 2 and t. xiv, fasc. 1)": p. [845]-855 (also numbered p. [481]-491)

=== Volume 15. 1920. 798 p. ===
Text in Arabic, Armenian, Ethiopic, Greek and Latin

- I - Documents relatifs au concile de Florence. I, La question du Purgatoire à Ferrare. Documents I-VI / Louis Petit,
- II - Les trophées de Damas: controverse judéo-chrétienne du VIIe siècle / texte grec édité et traduit / G. Bardy,
- III - Le synaxaire Arménien de Ter Israêl : III, Mois de sahmi/ G. Bayan,
- IV - Sancti Philoxeni Episcopi Mabbugensis Dissertationes decem de uno e sancta Trinitate incorporato et passo / textum syriacum edidit latineque vertit Mauritius Brière. Dissertatio Ia et IIa
- V - Le synaxaire Éthiopien: les mois de mois de tahschasch, ter et yakatit. IV, Le mois de tahschasch / S. Grébaut

=== Volume 16. 1922. 862 p. ===
Text in Arabic, Armenian, Greek, Latin and Syriac

- I - Le synaxaire arménien de Ter Israel: IV, Mois de tré / G. Bayan,
- II - Le synaxaire arabe Jacobite: (rédaction copte). IV, Les mois de barmahat, barmoudah et bachons / René Basset,
- III - Homélies mariales Byzantines: textes grecs / édités et traduits en Latin / M. Jugie,
- IV - La perle précieuse: traitant des sciences ecclésiastiques (chapitres I-LVI), par Jean, fils d'Abou-Zakariyâ, surnommé Ibn Sabâ`; texte arabe publié et traduit / J. Périer,
- V - Les homiliae cathedrales de Sévère d'Antioche (suite). Homélie LXXVII, texte grec édité et traduit en français, versions syriaques publiées pour la première fois / M.-A. Kugener & Edg. Triffaux

=== Volume 17. 1923. 857 p. ===
Text in Arabic, Ethiopic, Greek, Latin and Syriac

- I - John of Ephesus. Lives of the eastern saints. I. / E.W. Brooks,
- II - Documents relatifs au concile de Florence. II, Oeuvres anticonciliares de Marc d'Éphèse : documents VII-XXIV / Mgr L. Petit,
- III - Le synaxaire arabe Jacobite : (rédaction copte). V, Les mois de baounah, abib, mesoré et jours complémentaires / René Basset,
- IV - Les miracles de Jésus: texte éthiopien publié et traduit. III. / S. Grébaut

=== Volume 18. 1924. 833 p. ===
Text in Armenian, Coptic, Greek and Syriac

- I - Le synaxaire arménien de ter Israël: V, Mois de kalotz / G. Bayan,
- II - Le livre de Job: : version copte bohaïrique / E. Porcher,
- III - Les plus anciens monuments du christianisme écrits sur papyrus: textes grecs édités, traduits et annotés. II. / C. Wessely,
- IV - John of Ephesus. Lives of eastern saints. II. / E.W. Brooks,
- V - Histoire de Yahya-ibn-Sa'ïd d'Antioche continuateur de Sa'ïd-ibn-Bitriq / J. Kratchkovsky & A. Vasiliev

=== Volume 19. 1926. 741 p. ===
Text in Arabic, Armenian, Georgian, Greek, Latin and Syriac

- I - Le synaxaire arménien de ter Israël. VI, Mois de aratz / G. Bayan,
- II - John of Ephesus. Lives of the eastern saints. III. / E.W. Brooks,
- III - Homélies mariales Byzantines. II / M. Jugei,
- IV - Logia et agrapha Domini Jesu : apud Moslemicos scriptores, asceticos praesertim, usitata / collegit, vertit, notis instruxit Michaël Asin et Palacios. Fasciculus alter
- V - Le synaxaire Géorgien: rédaction ancienne de l'union arméno-géorgienne; publié et traduit d'après le manuscrit du Couvent Iviron du Mont Athos / N. Marr

=== Volume 20. 1929. 826 p. ===
Text in Arabic, Georgian, Latin and Syriac

- I - Moufazzal Ibn Abil-Fazaïl. Histoire des sultans Mamlouks. texte arabe publié et traduit en français / E. Blouchet,
- II - Les homeliae cathedrales de Sévère d'Antioche: traduction syriaque de Jacques d'Édesse. Homélies LXXVIII à LXXXIII / M. Brière,
- III - The old Georgian version of the gospel of Mark: from the Adysh Gospels with the variants of the Opiza and Tbet' Gospels; edited with a Latin translation / Robert P. Blake,
- IV - Livre de la lampe des ténèbres et de l'exposition (lumineuse) du service (de l'église), par Abû`l-Barakât connu sous le nom d'Ibn Kabar; texte arabe édité et traduit / L. Villecourt, Mgr Tisserant, G. Wiet,
- V - Le synaxaire arabe Jacobite: (rédaction copte). VI, Additions et corrections; Tables / F. Nau
- "Table des matières des tomes XI à XX": p. 796-826 (also numbered 6-38)

=== Volume 21. 1930. 870 p. ===
Text in Armenian with parallel translation in French

- I-VI - Le Synaxaire arménien de Ter Israël / publié et traduit par G. Bayan. VII, Mois de méhéki—Le Synaxaire arménien de Ter Israël / publié et traduit par G. Bayan. VIII, Mois de areg—Le Synaxaire arménien de Ter Israël / publié et traduit par G. Bayan. IX, Mois de ahékan—Le Synaxaire arménien de Ter Israël / publié et traduit par G. Bayan. X, Mois de maréri—Le Synaxaire arménien de Ter Israël / publié et traduit par G. Bayan. XI, Mois de margats—Le Synaxaire arménien de Ter Israël / publié et traduit par G. Bayan. XII, Mois de hrotits—Le Synaxaire arménien de Ter Israël / publié et traduit par G. Bayan. Jours avéleats

=== Volume 22. 1930. 888 p. ===
Text in Arabic, Greek, Slavic and Syriac

- I - Voyage du Patriarche Macaire d'Antioche: texte arabe et traduction française / Basile Radu,
- II - Les homiliae cathedrales de Sévère d'Antioch: traduction syriaque de Jacques d'Édesse (suite). Homélies XCIX à CIII; éditées et traduites en français / Ignazio Guidi,
- III - The Arabic life of S. Pisentius: according to the text of the two manuscripts Paris Bib. Nat. Arabe 4785, and Arabe 4794 / edited with English translation / De Lacy O'Leary,
- IV - Le candélabre des sanctuaires de Grégoire Aboulfaradj dit Barhebraeus, édité et traduit en français / Jean Bakos,
- V - Le "De autexusio" de Méthode d'Olympe; version slave et texte grec édités et traduit en français / A. Vaillant

=== Volume 23. 1932. 771 p. ===
- I - Les Homiliae cathedrales de Sévère d'Antioche; traduction syriaque de Jacques d'Édesse (suite). Homélies LXXXIV à XC; editées et traduites en français par Maurice Brière
- II - La première partie de l'Histoire de Barhadbesabba `Arbaïa; texte syriaque édité et traduit par F. Nau
- III - Histoire de Yahya-ibn-Sa`ïd d'Antioche, continuateur de Sa`ïd-ibn-Bitriq; éditée et traduite en français par I. Kratchkovsky et A. Vasiliev. Fascicule II
- IV - Les Paralipomènes, livres I et II : version éthiopienne; éditée et traduite par Sylvain Grébaut, d'après les manuscrits 94 de la Bibliothèque nationale et 35 de la collection d'Abbadie

=== Volume 24. 1933. 801 p. ===
Text in Arabic, Coptic, Georgian, Greek, Latin and Slavic

- I - the old Georgian version of the gospel of Matthew: from the Adysh Gospels with the variants of the Opiza and Tbet' Gospels. Edited with a Latin translation / Robert P. Blake,
- II - Le lectionnaire de la semaine sainte: texte copte édité avec traduction française d'après le manuscrit Add. 5997 du British Museum / O.H.E. Burmester,
- III - Le candélabre des sanctuaires de Grégoire Aboulfaradj dit Barhebraeus. II. / Ján Bakos,
- IV - Voyage du patriarche macaire d'Antioche. II. / Basile Radu,
- V - Euchologium Sinaiticum: texte slave avec sources grecques et traduction française / Jean Frek

=== Volume 25. 1943. 814 p. ===
Text in Coptic, Greek, Slavic and Syriac

- I - Les Homiliae cathedrales de Sévère d'Antioch. Homélies XCI à XCVIII / Maurice Brière,
- II - Le lectionnaire de la semaine sainte. II. / O.H.E. Burmester,
- III - Euchologium Sinaiticum. / Jean Frcek
- IV - Les homiliae cathedrales de Sévère d'Antioche. Homélies CIV à CXII / Maurice Brière

=== Volume 26. 1950. 720 p. ===
Text in Arabic, Ethiopic, Georgian, Greek, Latin and Syriac

- I - Le synaxaire Éthiopien / Sylvian Grébaut,
- II - La liturgie de Saint Jacques / Dom B.-Ch. Mercier,
- III - Les homiliae cathedrales de Sévère d'Antioche / Maurice Brière,
- IV - The old Georgian version of the gospel of John / Robert P. Blake, Maurice Brière,
- V - Voyage du patriarche macaire d'Antioche / Basile Radu

=== Volume 27. 1957. 626 p. ===
Text in Armenian, Georgian, Greek, Latin and Syriac

- I-II - Hippolyte de Rome / Maurice Brière, Louis Mariès et B.-Ch. Mercier,
- III - La version Géorgienne ancienne de l'évangile de Luc / Maurice Brière,
- IV - Le candélabre du sanctuaire de Grégoire Aboul' Faradj dit Barhebraeus / François Graffini

=== Volume 28. 1959. 776 p. ===
Text in Armenian, Coptic, Greek, and Syriac

- I - Les six centuries des "Kaphalaia Gnostica" d'Évagre le pontique / édition critique de la version syriaque commune et édition d'une nouvelle version syriaque, intégrale, avec une double traduction française par Antoine Guillaumont
- II - Les homiliae cathedrales de Sévère d'Antioch / Ignaziole Pontique / Antoine Guillaumont,
- II - Le grand euchologe du Monastère Blanc / Emmanuel Lanne,
- III - Eznik de Kolb, de deo, édition critique du texte arménien / Louis Mariès et Charles Mercier,
- IV - Eznik de Kolb, de deo, traduction française, notes et tables / Louis Mariès et Charles Mercier

=== Volume 29. 1961. 869 p. ===
Text in Georgian, Latin and Syriac

- I - Les homiliae cathedrales de Sévère d'Antioch.Introduction générale à toutes les homélies. Homélies CXX à CXXV éditées et traduites en français / Maurice Brière,
- II - the old Georgian version of the Prophets. Petits prophètes. Critical ed. with a Latin translation / Robert Pierpoint Blake & Canon Maurice Brière,
- III - id. Isaïe,
- IV - id. Jérémie,
- V - id. Ézéchiel et Daniel

=== Volume 30. 1963. 894 p. ===
Text in Armenian, Georgian, Latin and Syriac

- I - Hymnes de saint Éphrem conservées en version arménienne. Texte arménien, traduction latine et notes explicatives / Louis Mariès and Charles Mercier,
- II - Le candélabre du sanctuaire de Grégoire Aboulfaradj dit Bar Hebraeus. Septième base, Des démons / texte syriaque édité pour la première fois avec traduction française. / Micheline Albert,
- III - The old Georgian version of the Prophets [5], Apparatus criticus / Robert P. Blake et Maurice Brière,
- IV - Le candélabre du sanctuaire de Grégoire Aboulfaradj dit Bar Hebraeus. Cinquième base, Des anges / texte syriaque édité pour la première fois et traduction française / Antoine Torbey,
- V - La lettre à Patricius d'Édesse de Philoxène de Mabboug. édition critique du texte syriaque et traduction française / René Lavenant
- Table des matières des tomes XXI à XXX

=== Volume 31. 1966. 616 p. ===
- I. Le candélabre du sanctuaire de Grégoire Abou'lfaradj dit Barhebraeus. Quatrième base, De l'incarnation / texte syriaque édité pour la première fois avec traduction française par Joseph Khoury
- II. Les Canons d'Hippolyte / édition critique de la version arabe, introduction et traduction française par René-Georges Coquin
- III. Barsanuphius and John, questions and answer / critical edition of the Greek text with English translation by Derwas James Chitty

=== Volume 32. 1966. 490 p. ===
- I. Soma Deggua : antiphonaire du Carême, quatre premières semaines. fasc. 1-2. Texte éthiopien avec variantes—fasc. 3-4.
- Introduction, traduction française, transcriptions musicales / Velat, Bernard

=== Volume 33. 1966. 712 p. ===
- I. Études sur le Me`eraf, commun de l'office divin éthiopien / Velat, Bernard

=== Volume 34. 1968. 716 p. [Last in Paris] ===
- I. Me`eraf : commun de l'office divin éthiopien pour toute l'année / texte éthiopien avec variantes par Bernard Velat
- II. Homélies de Narsaï sur la création / édition critique du texte syriaque, introduction et traduction française par Philippe Gignoux

=== Volume 35. 1970. 692 p. [Brepols] ===
- I. Le codex arménien Jérusalem 121. I, Introduction aux origines de la liturgie hiérosolymitaine, lumières nouvelles / par Athanase Renoux
- II. Le candélabre du sanctuaire de Grégoire Abou'lfaradj dit Barhebraeus. Dixième base, De la résurrection / texte syriaque édité pour la première fois avec traduction française par Élise Zigmund-Cerbü
- III. Les Homiliae cathedrales de Sévère d'Antioche / traduction syriaque de Jacques d'Édesse (suite). Homélies XLVI à LI / éditées et traduites en français par M. Brière et F. Graffin
- IV. Textes coptes relatifs à saint Claude d'Antioche. Four Coptic texts, with French translations, from the Coptic manuscript
- no. 587 in the Pierpont Morgan Library, New York. French tr. / par Gérard Godron

=== Volume 36. 1971. 676 p. ===
- I. Les Homiliae cathedrales de Sévère d'Antioche / traduction syriaque de Jacques d'Édesse (suite). Homélies XL à XLV / éditées et traduites en français par M. Brière et F. Graffin
- II. Le codex arménien Jérusalem 121. II, Édition comparée du texte et de deux autres manuscrits / introduction, textes, traduction et notes par Athanase Renoux
- III. Les Homiliae cathedrales de Sévère d'Antioche / traduction syriaque de Jacques d'Édesse (suite). Homélies XXXII à XXXIX / éditées et traduites en français par M. Brière, F. Graffin et C.J.A. Lash
- IV. Les Homiliae cathedrales de Sévère d'Antioche / traduction syriaque de Jacques d'Édesse (suite). Homélies XXVI à XXXI / éditées et traduites en français par M. Brière et F. Graffin

=== Volume 37. 1975. 179, lxx, 355 p. ===
- I. Les Homiliae cathedrales de Sévère d'Antioche / traduction syriaque de Jacques d'Édesse (suite). Homélies XVIII à XXV / éditées et traduites en français par M. Brière et F. Graffin
- II. Memre sur Nicomédie / Éphrem de Nisibe; édition des fragments de l'original syriaque et de la version arménienne, traduction française, introduction et notes par Charles Renoux

=== Volume 38. 1976. 728 p. ===
- I. Homélies contre les Juifs / Jacques de Saroug; édition critique du texte syriaque inédit, traduction française, introduction et notes par Micheline Albert
- II. Les Homiliae cathedrales de Sévère d'Antioche / traduction syriaque de Jacques d'Édesse. Homélies I à XVII / éditées et traduites en français par M. Brière et F. Graffin; avec la collaboration de C.J.A. Lash et J.-M. Sauget
- III. Sancti Philoxeni Episcopi Mabbugensis Dissertationes decem de uno e sancta Trinitate incorporato et passo. II, Dissertationes 3a, 4a, 5a / textum syriacum ediderunt latineque verterunt M. Brière et F. Graffin
- IV. Trois homélies syriaques anonymes et inédites sur L'Épiphanie / introduction, texte syriaque et traduction française par Alain Desreumaux

=== Volume 39. 1978. 764 p. ===
- I. Nouveaux fragments arméniens de l'Adversus haereses et de l'Epideixis / Irénée de Lyon; introduction, traduction latine et notes par Charles Renoux
- II. Lettre de Sophrone de Jérusalem à Arcadius de Chypre : version syriaque inédite du texte grec perdu / introduction et traduction française par Micheline Albert; avec la collaboration de Christoph von Schönborn
- III. La collection des lettres de Jean de Dalyatha / édition critique du texte syriaque inédit, traduction française, introduction et notes par Robert Beulay
- IV. Sancti Philoxeni Episcopi Mabbugensis Dissertationes decem de uno e sancta Trinitate incorporato et passo (Memre contre Habib). III, Dissertationes 6a, 7a, 8a / édition critique du texte syriaque inédit et traduction française par M. Brière et F. Graffin

=== Volume 40. 1979. 723 p. ===
- I. Narsai's metrical homilies on the Nativity, Epiphany, Passion, Resurrection, and Ascension : critical edition of Syriac text / English translation by Frederick G. McLeod
- II. Sancti Philoxeni Episcopi Mabbugensis Dissertationes decem de uno e sancta Trinitate incorporato et passo. IV, Dissertationes 9a, 10a / édition critique du texte syriaque inédit et traduction française par M. Brière et F. Graffin
- III. Le candélabre du sanctuaire de Grégoire Abou'lfaradj dit Barhebraeus. Douzième base, Du paradis : suivie du Livre des rayons, traité X / texte syriaque édité pour la première fois avec traduction française par Nicolas Séd
- IV. Une correspondance islamo-chrétienne entre Ibn al-Munaǧǧim, Ḥunayn ibn Isḥāq et Qusṭā ibn Lūqā / Introduction, Édition, Division, Notes et Index par Khalil Samir / Introduction, Traduction et Notes par Paul Nwyia

=== Volume 41. 1982. 533 p. ===
- I. Sancti Philoxeni Episcopi Mabbugensis Dissertationes decem de uno e sancta Trinitate incorporato et passo (Memre contre Habib). V, Appendices: Tractatus, Refutatio, Epistula dogmatica, Florigelium / édition critique du texte syriaque inédit et traduction française par M. Brière et F. Graffin
- II. Barsabée de Jérusalem sur le Christ et les églises / Michel van Esbroeck
- III. Le candélabre du sanctuaire de Grégoire Abou'lfaradj dit Barhebraeus. Onzième base, Du judgement dernier / texte syriaque édité pour la première fois avec traduction française par Nicolas Séd
- IV. Homélies anonymes du VIe siècle : dissertation sur le Grand-Prêtre, homélies sur la pécheresse I, II, III / édition du texte syriaque inédit, introduction et traduction française par François Graffin

=== Volume 42. 1983. ===
- Homélies sur Job : version arménienne. I-XXIV / Hésychius de Jérusalem; édition, introduction et notes par Charles Renoux—Brefs chapîtres sur la Trinité et l'Incarnation / Al-Safi ibn al-'Assal; introduction, texte arabe et traduction, avec un index-lexique exhaustif par Khalil Samir

=== Volume 43. 1985 ===
La chaîne arménienne sur les Épîtres catholiques. I, La chaîne sur l'Épître de Jacques / Charles Renoux—Le candélabre de Grégoire Abou'lfaradj dit Barhebraeus. Neuvième base, Du libre arbitre / texte syriaque édité pour la première fois avec traduction française par Paul-Hubert Poirier—Le synaxaire éthiopien. Mois de maskaram / édition critique du texte éthiopien et traduction par Gérard Colin—Six homélies festales en prose / Jacques de Saroug; édition critique du texte syriaque, introduction et traduction française par Frédéric Rilliet

=== Volume 44. 1987 ===
Le synaxaire éthiopien. Mois de teqemt / édition critique du texte éthiopien et traduction par Gérard Colin—La chaîne arménienne sur les Épîtres catholiques. II, La chaîne sur les Épîtres de Pierre / par Charles Renoux—Le synaxaire éthiopien. Mois de hedar / édition critique du texte éthiopien et traduction par Gérard Colin—Le lectionnaire de Jérusalem en Arménie : le Casoc`. I, Introduction et liste des manuscrits / par Charles Renoux

=== Volume 45. 1989 ===
Le synaxaire éthiopien. Mois de terr / édition critique du texte éthiopien et traduction par Gérard Colin—Lettre sur les trois étapes de la vie monastique / Joseph Hazzaya; édition critique du texte syriaque et introduction par Paul Harb, François Graffin; avec la collaboration de Micheline Albert—Le synaxaire éthiopien. Mois de Yakkatit / édition critique du texte éthiopien et traduction par Gérard Colin—Martyre de Pilate / édition critique de la version éthiopienne et traduction française par Robert Beylot

=== Volume 46. 1994 ===
La chaîne arménienne sur les Épîtres catholiques. III, La chaîne sur la première épitre de Jean / par Charles Renoux—Le synaxaire éthiopien. Mois de maggabit / édition critique du texte éthiopien et traduction française par Gérard Colin—Le synaxaire éthiopien. Mois de miyazya / édition critique du texte éthiopien et traduction française par Gérard Colin

=== Volume 47. 1996-1997 ===
A metrical homily on holy Mar Ephrem / by Mar Jacob of Sarug; critical edition of the Syriac text, translation and introduction by Joseph P. Amar—La chaîne arménienne sur les épîtres catholiques. IV. La chaîne sur 2-3 Jean et Jude / par Charles Renoux—Le synaxaire éthiopien. Mois de genbot / édition critique dy texte éthiopien et traduction française par Gérard Colin—Histoire de Yahya ibn Sa`id d'Antioche / édition critique du texte arabe préparée par Ignace Kratchkovsky; et traduction française annotée par Françoise Micheau et Gérard Troupeau

=== Volume 48. 1999 ===
Atti di Banadlewos (1303-1400) / edizione del testo etiopico e traduzione italiana di Osvaldo Raineri—Le lectionnaire de Jérusalem en Arménie : le Casoc`. II, Édition synoptique des plus anciens témoins / par Charles Renoux—Le synaxaire éthiopien. Index généraux; Annexes / par Gérard Colin—The life of Timothy Kakhusht / two Arabic texts edited and translated by John C. Lamoreaux and Cyril Cairala

=== Volume 49. 2004 ===
L'homélie sur l'église du Rocher / attribuée à Timothée Ælure (2 v.)

== See also ==
- Patrologia Graeca – writings in Greek (161 volumes)
- Patrologia Latina – writings in Latin (221 volumes)
