= Synaxarium =

Collection of hagigraphies of the Eastern Churches' saints and martyrs

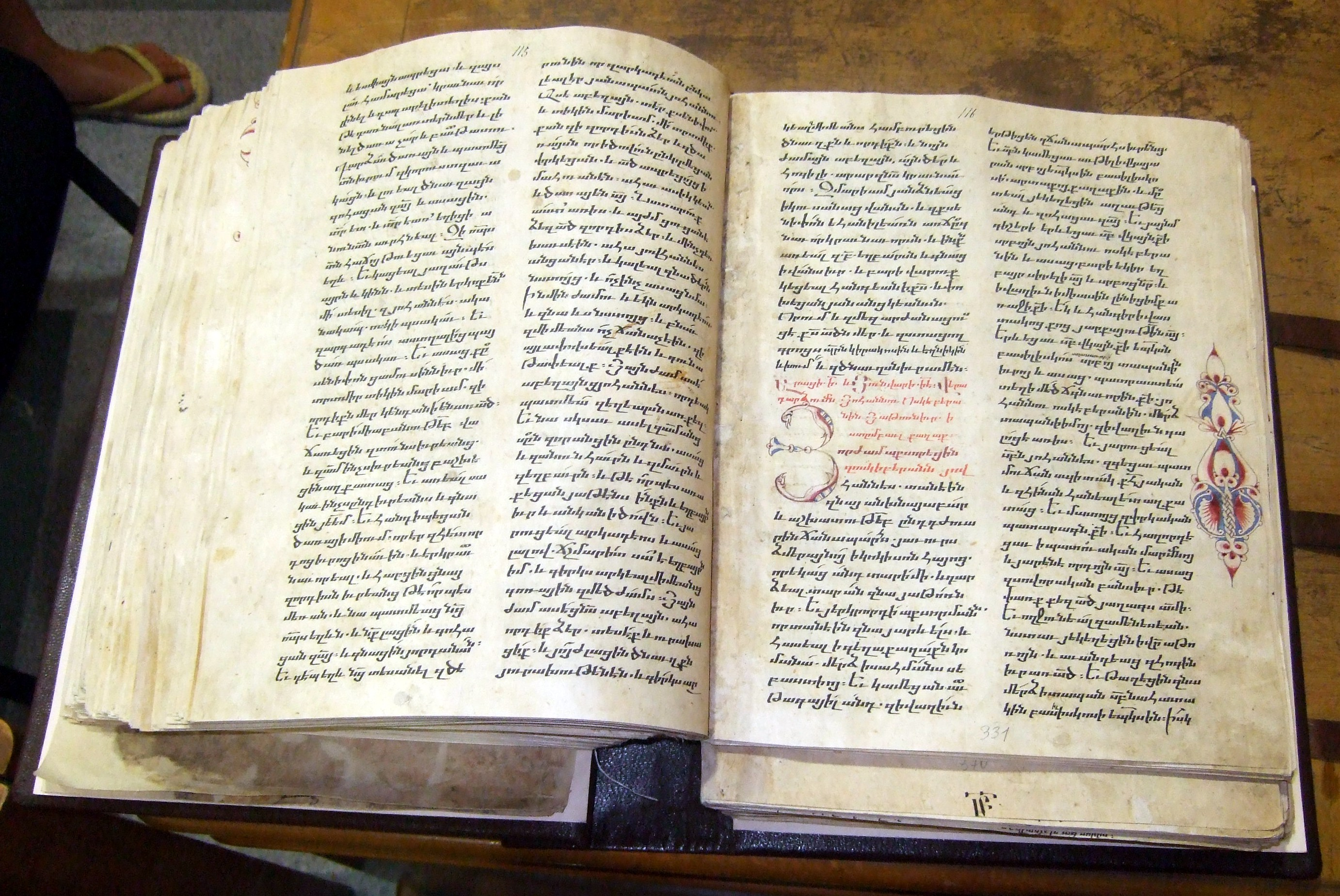
A Haysmavurk (Synaxarion) in Armenian restored and kept in Matenadaran

In terminology of Eastern Orthodox, Oriental Orthodox and Eastern Catholic Churches, Synaxarion, Synaxarium or Synaxary (plurals Synaxaria, Synaxaries; Greek: Συναξάριον, from συνάγειν, synagein, "to bring together"; cf. etymology of synaxis and synagogue; Latin: Synaxarium, Synexarium; Coptic: ⲥⲩⲛⲁⲝⲁⲣⲓⲟⲛ; Ge'ez: ሲናክሳሪየም(ስንክሳር); Arabic: ٱلسِّنْكِسَارُ/ٱلسَّنْكِسَارُ/ٱلسِّنَكْسَارُ, romanized: As-sinkisār/As-sankisār/As-sinaksār) is a compilation of hagiographies corresponding roughly to the martyrology of the Roman Church.

There are two kinds of synaxaria:

- Simple synaxaria: lists of the saints arranged in the order of their anniversaries, e.g. the calendar of Morcelli
- Historical synaxaria: including biographical notices, e.g. the Menologion of Basil II and the synaxarium of Sirmond. The notices given in the historical synaxaria are summaries of those in the great menologies, or collections of lives of saints, for the twelve months of the year. As the lessons in the Byzantine Divine Office are mostly the lives of saints, the Synaxarion became the collection of short lives of saints and martyrs, but also of accounts of events, of famous visions seen by saints and even useful narratives whose memory is kept.

== Definitions ==
The exact meaning of the name has changed at various times. Its first use was for the index to the Biblical and other lessons to be read in church. In this sense it corresponds to the Latin Capitulare and Comes. Then the Synaxarion was filled up with the whole text of the pericopes to be read. As far as the Holy Liturgy was concerned this meant that it was essentially transformed into the "Gospel" and "Apostle" books. Synaxarion remained the title for the index to the other lessons. Without changing its name it was filled up with complete texts of these lessons. The mere index of such lessons is generally called menologion heortastikon, a book now hardly needed or used, since the Typikon supplies the same, as well as other, information.

Certain calendars extant in the Middle Ages were also called Synaxaria. Krumbacher describes those composed by Christopher of Mytilene and Theodore Prodromus (twelfth century).

== Examples ==
The oldest historical synaxaria apparently go back to the tenth century. There are a great number of medieval synaxaria extant in manuscript. They are important for Byzantine heortology and church history. The short lives that form the lessons were composed or collected by various writers. Of these Symeon Metaphrastes is the most important. The accounts are of very varying historical value. Emperor Basil II (976-1025) ordered a revision of the synaxarion, which forms an important element of the present official edition. The synaxarion is not now used as a separate book; it is incorporated in the Menaia. The account of the saint or feast is read in the Orthros after the sixth ode of the Canon. It is printed in its place here, and bears each time the name synaxarion as title. Synaxarion then in modern use means, not the whole collection, but each separate lesson in the Menaia and other books. An example of such a synaxarion (for St. Martin I, 13 April) will be found in Nilles, op. cit., infra, I, xlix. Some surviving examples of regional Synaxaria are:

- The Coptic Synaxarium- Also known as the Synaxarium Alexandrinum, which is employed by the Coptic Orthodox Church. Publication was started by J. Forget in the Corp. script. orient.. It was written using the Coptic language (Coptic: ⲥⲩⲛⲁⲝⲁⲣⲓⲟⲛ) before the adoption of Arabic as an official language of Egypt.
- The Ethiopian Synaxarium- which belongs to the Ethiopian Orthodox Church was first published by I. Guidi in the Patrologia orientalis, as well as by E.A. Wallis Budge.
- The Armenian Synaxarium of Ter Israel- which is used by the Armenian Apostolic Church was published at Constantinople in 1834, and again in Patrologia Orientalis.
- The Georgian Synaxarium- There are also various Georgian synaxaria, surviving in various complete states.
- The Roman Martyrology- which is utilized by the Roman Catholic Church for its calendar of saints.
- The Arab-Jacobite Synaxarium- which is composed in Arabic (Arabic: السِّنْكِسارُ) and used by the Syriac Orthodox Church.
- Synaxarion of Constantinople

== See also ==
- Calendar of saints
- Hagiography
- Paterikon
