= Gregory of Cyprus =

Gregory of Cyprus may refer to:

- Gregory of Cyprus (monk), Syriac writer in the 6th or 7th century
- Gregory II of Constantinople, patriarch (1283–1289)
