= Joseph Hazzaya =

Syriac Christian writer and mystic (born c. 710)

Joseph Hazzaya (Syriac: ܝܘܣܦ ܚܙܝܐ, romanized: Yawsep Ḥazzāyā; born c. 710) was an 8th-century Syriac Christian writer, ascetic and mystic. The nickname Hazzaya means 'the seer' or 'the visionary'. He belonged to the Church of the East.

The main source of biographical information on Joseph is the Book of Chastity of Isho'dnah of Basra, written a century or so after his death. He was born to a Persian family of Zoroastrian religion in the village of Nimrud about 710. During the reign of the Caliph Umar II (717–720), the villagers rebelled and the seven-year-old Joseph taken captive by the caliph. He was sold as a slave to an Arab in Sinjar, who later sold him to a Christian from Qardu. There, Joseph became familiar with the ascetic life of the monks of the monastery of John of Kamul. He requested to be baptized and was freed by his owner in order to enter the monastery of Abba Sliba as a novice. His brother also converted to Christianity and took the name Abdisho.

At the end of his novitiate, Joseph moved back to Qardu and lived as a hermit for some years. He then became the abbot of the local monastery of Mar Bassima, before moving to Mount Zinai in Adiabene to resume the life of a hermit. Again, he was persuaded to become the abbot of the local monastery of Rabban Bakhtisho. He continued in this office until his death.

Abdisho bar Berika claimed that Joseph wrote 1,900 treatises, but only ten were extant in Abdisho's time. He is generally regarded as a systematizer of the mystic and ascetic practices of the Church of the East. His most systematic work, A Letter on the Three Stages of the Monastic Life, is misattributed to Philoxenus of Mabbug in the manuscripts. Like Philoxenus, Joseph taught that the monastic life fosters the charismatic gifts. He belonged to the same theological family as Isaac of Nineveh, Simon of Taibuteh and John of Dalyatha. He was the first to synthesise the three contemplations of the Hellenistic scholar Evagrius Ponticus (4th-century) with the tripartite division of the Syriac John of Apamea (5th century). Among his other works are the treatise On the Divine Essence, the Chapters of Knowledge and the Book of Questions and Answers. Many of his works, such as the Treatise on the Workings of the Grace of God, are erroneously transmitted under his brother's name.

At a synod held in 786–787 or 790, the Patriarch Timothy I condemned Joseph Hazzaya and two other ascetic authors, John of Dalyatha and John the Solitary, for heresy. According to Timothy, Joseph rejected prayer and the divine office as impediments to receiving the charismatic gifts. He also supposedly slipped into Messalianism, claiming that a gmirā (person who had achieved perfection) did not need prayer, the office, scripture reading or manual labour. These charges are not substantiated by any of Joseph's surviving writings, but David Wilmshurst considers them unsurprising if Joseph claimed to be a "privileged recipient of divine revelation" as his nickname implies.

The date of Joseph's death is unknown. Karl Pinggéra believes he was alive at the time of the synod, but Micheline Albert believes he was already dead by then.
