= John bar Penkaye =

Syrian writer

John bar Penkaye (Syriac: ܝܘܚܢܢ ܒܪ ܦܢܟܝ̈ܐ Yōḥannān bar Penkāyē) was a writer of the late seventh century who was a member of the Church of the East. He lived at the time of the fifth Umayyad caliph, Abd al-Malik ibn Marwan.

His surname indicates that his parents came from Feneq, on the Tigris east of Tur Abdin. He was a monk at the monastery of Mar John of Kamul, and later at the monastery of Mar Bassima. Later writers confuse him with John Saba of Dalyatha.

John bar Penkaye's writings provides an eyewitness account of the early Muslim conquests of his time.

== Works ==
A number of his works are still in existence. Most of them have never been published and are extant only in manuscripts.

=== Ktâbâ d-rêš mellê or Summary history of the world ===
This is in 15 books.

- Books 1–4 cover from creation to Herod the Great
- Book 5 is on demons
- Book 6–8 are largely on typology in the Old Testament
- Book 9 is about the cults of pagan people. It includes important information on Zoroastrianism.
- Books 10–13 are on the life of Christ, and of his disciples.
- Book 14 covers history from there up to the Arab conquest.
- Book 15 covers the period to the last decades of the 7th century, and so is contemporary. Few such sources are known.

== Manuscripts ==
- Harvard MS Syr 42. This contains "a collection of ascetical literature dominated by a fairly complete assembly of the works of John of Dalyatha (eighth century), and including brief selections from John bar Penkaye, Evagrius Ponticus, Basil the Great, Philoxenus of Mabbug, John Chrysostom, and the monks Gregory (of Cyprus?) and Simon (the Graceful?)" (Ref: M. Henze, The Syriac Apocalypse of Daniel: Introduction, Text, and Commentary. Studien und Texte zur Antike und Christentum 11. Tübingen: Mohr Siebeck, (2001) as described in Alexander Golitzin, Making the Inside like the Outside: Toward a Monastic Sitz im Leben for the Syriac Apocalypse of Daniel, Contribution to a Festschrift, edited by Monica Blanchard and Robin Darling Young for Catholic University of America Press, forthcoming 2003. Online at http://www.marquette.edu/maqom/daniel).
- Biblioteca apostolica Vaticana, "Vat." sir. 497 * 20e s. : (1900). Alqos - MAR JOHANNAN BAR PENKAYE, "Histoire des principaux événements du monde" * (Stephan Raës, copiste) (Reference found online at http://www.ftsr.ulaval.ca/_pdf/bibp/index_manuscrits4_origines2003.pdf)
- Several works are contained in mss. at the monastery of Rabban Hormizd (Notre-Dame des Semences) at Alqosh, and listed by Addai Scher in his catalogue.
  - Codex 25. Book of the archaeology or history of the temporal world composed by St. John Bar Penkaye. The work is divided into two sections, the first of 9 chapters and the second 6. It finishes in 686 AD.
  - Codex 116. The tenth item in this miscellaneous volume is a poem On faith in God by John bar Penkaye, published by Elia Millos in 1868.
  - Codex 122. Book of good works, composed by John of Mosul. But following this is a poem by John bar Penkaye On the vices of the monks; and then other works by other authors. The Ms. was written in 1758. Most of the works, including John's, were published by Elia Millos, Directorium Spirituale, Rome (1868).
  - Codex 123. Same content as Ms. 122, but the Ms. dates to 1663.
- Vatican Borgia Syr. Ms. 1. This is a copy of the Book of good works, composed by John of Mosul, and is followed by a poem by John bar Penkaye, On the vices of the monks; the Book of the pearl by Ebedjesu; Catalogue of Syriac writers also by Ebedjesu. 217 folios. The last folios have gone. Written at Alqosh in May 1674. Listed in Addai Scher's catalogue of the Borgia mss. in the Journal Asiatique, March–April 1909 (online at gallica.bnf.fr)

== Bibliography ==
- Addai Scher, Notice sur la vie et les oeuvres de Yohannan bar Penkaye, Journal Asiatique, ser. 10. vol. 10 (1907), p. 161-178. Available online from http://gallica.bnf.fr (search for Journal Asiatique). This publishes the text and French translation of a notice, and then an analysis of his principal work.
- S. P. Brock, North Mesopotamia in the late 7th century : book 15 of John Bar Penkaye's "Ris Melle", Jerusalem Studies in Arabic and Islam, 9 (1987), reprinted in Studies in Syriac Christianity (1992), chapter 2. (More details from Copac).
- Hubert Kaufhold, Anmerkungen zur Textüberlieferung der Chronik des Johannes bar Penkaye, Oriens christianus 87 (2003) pp. 65–79. (Reference found on the web)
- Alphonse Mingana (ed.), Books X-XV in Sources Syriaques vol. 1 (and only vol.), Leipzig (1907). Syriac text and French translation.
- K. Pinggéra, Nestorianische Weltchronistik. Johannes Bar Penkaye und Elias von Nisibis, in: Martin Wallraff (Hrsg.), Iulius Africanus und die christliche Weltchronistik (Texte und Untersuchungen zur altchristlichen Literatur), Berlin; New York: de Gruyter 2006, 263–283.
- Jean-Louis Simonet, Les citations des Actes des Apôtres dans les chapitres édités du Ketaba deres melle de Jean Bar Penkaye, Le Muséon: Revue d'Études Orientales (ISSN 0771-6494) vol. 114 (2001) pp. 97–119. (Reference found on the web)

== Sources ==
- Brock, Sebastian P. (1992). Studies in Syriac Christianity: History, Literature, and Theology. Aldershot: Variorum. ISBN 9780860783053.
- Brock, Sebastian P. (1997). A Brief Outline of Syriac Literature. Kottayam: St. Ephrem Ecumenical Research Institute.
