= Monastery of Mar Bassima =

The Monastery of Mar Bassima was an East Syriac monastery on the slopes of Mount Judi (Note: Also known as Mount Qardu or Mount Kola (i.e., the mount of the Ark), this is the resting place of Noah's Ark according to the Syriac Peshitta.) between the 7th and 13th centuries. Its full name and dedication was Monastery of Mar Hnanya, Mar Hnanishoʿ, Mar Bassima, and Mar Habib, but it was commonly called the Monastery of the Bear (debba in Syriac). Its exact position on the mountain is uncertain, as no ruins remain.

According to the 9th-century Book of Chastity of Ishoʿdnah of Basra, the monastery was founded by Mar Habib near the village of Kfar Tuta. Later, Bassima, while in royal service, (Note: This could have happened under either the Sasanian Empire or the early Caliphate.) was told by a Zoroastrian magus that he would become a monk. After spending some time in several different monasteries, he settled permanently in that of Mar Habib, which he proceeded to enlarge.

In the late 7th or early 8th century, John bar Penkaye moved to the monastery of Mar Bassima from the monastery of John of Kamul. In the middle of the 8th century, the famous mystic Joseph Hazzaya served as its abbot for a time. The history of the monastery between the 8th century and the 13th is completely unknown. At an unknown date in the 13th century, however, a manuscript was copied there. Its colophon reads as follows:

This book ... was completed and finished in the holy monastery, the place of rest for humility, Tabor's abode, Sion's Upper Room, the fragrant shrine [of] the holy Mar Hnanya, Mar Hnanishoʿ, Mar Bassima, and Mar Habbib, known as the [monastery] of the Bear, situated ... on the edge of the resting place of Noah and his children when [they] came out of the Ark, it being on the slopes of the mountain of the Ark.

The two other saints that became associated with the monastery, Mar Hnanya and Mar Hnanishoʿ, are otherwise unknown. This manuscript, now British Library, Oriental 3336, contains the only known copy of Gabriel of Qatar's Commentary on the Liturgy.
