= Isaac the Syrian =

7th-century Christian bishop and theologian

Saint Isaac the Syrian
- image of Isaac from a 1389 manuscript created at the Monastery of Great Lavra

Bishop, Hieromonk, Ascetic
- Born: c. 613; Beth Qatraye, Eastern Arabia
- Died: c. 700 (age c. 87); Nineveh, Umayyad Caliphate
- Venerated in: Church of the East; Catholic Church; Eastern Orthodox Church
- Major shrine: Rabban Hormizd Monastery
- Feast: January 28 (Church of the East); May 14 (Syriac Orthodox)
- Attributes: Turban, cape, scrolls, writing tools

Isḥaq of Nineveh (Syriac: ܡܪܝ ܐܝܣܚܩ ܕܢܝܢܘܐ, romanized: mār isḥāq d-ninwē; Arabic: إسحاق النينوي Ishaq an-Naynuwī; c. 613 – c. 700), also remembered as Saint Isaac the Syrian (Ancient Greek: Ἰσαὰκ ὁ Σύρος), Isaac of Nineveh, Abba Isaac, Isaac Syrus and Isaac of Qatar, was a 7th-century Syriac Christian bishop of the Church of the East, and theologian best remembered for his written works on Christian asceticism. He is regarded as a saint in the Church of the East, Roman Catholic, Eastern Orthodox and Syriac Orthodox (Note: According to K. Mani Rajan of the Jacobite Syrian Christian Church) churches. His feast day falls, together with 4th-century theologian and hymnographer St. Ephrem the Syrian, on January 28. In the Syriac Orthodox Church, his feast day falls on May 14.

== Life ==
Isaac was born in the region of Beth Qatraye in Eastern Arabia, a mixed Syriac- and Arabic-speaking region encompassing the south east of Mesopotamia and the north-eastern Arabian Peninsula. When the Catholicos Giwargis I of the Church of the East (661–680), visited Beth Qatraye in 676 to attend a synod, he ordained Isaac bishop of Nineveh far to the north in Assyria.

According to Isho'dnah's Book of Chastity, Isaac was Bishop of Nineveh only for a brief period before abdicating for an unknown reason. Isho'dnah continues that Isaac retired first to Mount Matuot in Beth Huzaye, then to the monastery of Rabban Shabur (located near Shushtar in present-day Khuzestan, Iran), where he died and was buried. At the time of his death, Isho'dnah reports that he was nearly blind due to his devotion to study.

== Writings ==
=== Overview ===
Abdisho bar Brikha claims that Isaac wrote seven volumes. Isaac's known writings comprise a 'First Part', 'Second Part', and 'Third Part'. Passages of a supposed 'Fifth Part' have also been discovered, but there is no academic consensus about whether they are authentic. The 'First Part' alone was translated into Greek in antiquity, and from Greek into various other languages, such as Slavonic. The 'Second Part' was rediscovered in the 1980s, and the 'Third Part' in the 1990s. Isaac's writings survive in Syriac manuscripts, and in later translations into languages including Greek, Arabic, Georgian, and Sogdian.

Isaac's main influences include Evagrius Ponticus, Pseudo-Dionysius, John the Solitary, Ephrem the Syrian, Narsai, and Theodore of Mopsuestia. In turn, Isaac influenced later Syriac writers such as John of Dalyatha and Joseph Hazzaya.

Sebastian Brock has provided a summary as of 2024 of all editions and translations of each of the three known 'Parts' of Isaac's writings. Brock, Mary Hansbury, and the Holy Transfiguration Monastery have been Isaac's primary translators into English, and Sabino Chialà into Italian.

=== First Part ===
The 'First Part' is the most widely known part. Arent Jan Wensinck produced an English translation of the original Syriac text in 1923. In 1983 the Holy Transfiguration Monastery in Brookline published an English translation based primarily on the ancient Greek translation of the First Part, though with reference to the original Syriac text. A revised second edition of this translation was published in 2011, with a third printing in 2020. The number and order of homilies in the First Part can vary greatly depending on the manuscript or edition.

=== Second Part ===
The 'Second Part' contains 41 chapters, of which Chapter 3 is by far the longest. Chapter 3, also known as the 'Headings on Spiritual Knowledge', contains roughly 400 chapters of various lengths, arranged in four centuries. Recently, parts of these headings (i.e., Chapter 3 of the 'Second Part') have been identified in Sogdian fragments from Turfan.

The Second Part was discovered in April 1983 at the Bodleian Library by Sebastian Brock, who found that MS syr. e. 7, originally donated by the Assyrian priest Yaroo Michael Neesan (1853–1937) to the Bodleian Library on 29 June 1898, in fact contained writings of Isaac the Syrian that were hitherto unknown to Western scholars, even though they were regularly read by Syriac readers. Bodleian MS syr. e. 7 is a parchment manuscript written in small East Syrian Estrangela script and is 195–200 mm long by 145–150 mm wide with 190 folios. There are about 26 lines per page, with about 23 lines near the beginning. It was copied during the 10th or 11th century in the Monastery of Mar ‘Abdisho‘ of Kom by the scribe Marqos for Rabban Isho‘ of the village of Beth B‘DY.

After 1983, incomplete manuscripts of Part 2 have been discovered in Cambridge MS Or. 1144, which is a part of Bibliothèque Nationale de France, MS syr. 298 (c. 11th-13th century). Chapters 1–3 have been translated into English by Brock (2022) (with Chapters 1–2 previously published in Brock (1997) as well), while an English translation of chapters 4–41, along with the original Syriac text, can be found in Brock (1995). A complete French translation was published by André Louf (2003), and a partial Greek translation was published by Kavvadas (2006). Selections from Part 2 have been translated into Italian by Bettiolo (1985) and into Catalan by Nin (2005).

List of manuscripts containing the 'Second Part':

- Oxford, Bodleian Library, MS syr. e.7 (10th/11th century) (complete manuscript)
  - Tehran, Mar Issayi Collection, MS 4 (copied from MS syr. e.7) (1895)
- Paris MS syr. 298 (11th/12th century)
- Harvard University, Houghton Library, MS syr. 57 (13th/14th century)
- Baghdad, Chaldean Monastery, MS syr. 680 (olim Alqosh 237) (for chs. 7, 9, 15.1-6, 11, 18.18-22, 32, 34–36) (1288/9)
  - Mingana syr. 601 (copied from Baghdad MS syr. 680) (1932)
- Mingana syr. 86 (for chs. 24.11-13, 20.25, 25) (c. 1300)
- British Library, Add. 14632 (for chs. 16–17) (10th century)
- British Library, Add. 14633 (for chs. 16–17) (c. 11th century)
- Tehran, Mar Issayi Collection, MS 5 (for ch. 25) (1900)
- Paul Bedjan's edition of ch. 54-55 of Part I (= chs. 16-17 of Part II) (based on ms of 1235)
- Paul Bedjan's edition of lost Urmiah manuscript (for chs. 5.5,22-26,29-30; and ch. 11); the original manuscript is presumed to have been lost during World War I, although Bedjan's transcription has been published.

=== Third Part ===
The 'Third Part' has been translated into English by Mary Hansbury (2016), into French by André Louf (2009), and into Italian by Sabino Chialà (2004, 2011). It is based on Issayi MS 5, held in Tehran, Iran. The manuscript is a 1903 copy of a 14th-century original manuscript that has now been lost. It was discovered by Monsignor Yuhannan Samaan Issayi, the Chaldean archbishop of Tehran, at an antiquarian Jewish bookshop and was kept in his private library. After his death in 1999, Belgian scholar Michel van Esbroek found the manuscript in Issayi's library in Tehran and announced its discovery to the international scholars. Issayi MS 5 has 133 folios, with 111 folios containing 17 homilies that can be attributed to Isaac. There are 14 homilies not found in other texts that are numbered as 1–13 and 16 within Part 3. The other three texts in Issayi MS 5 can also be found in extant Part 1 and Part 2 manuscripts.

=== Fifth Part ===
Supposed portions of the 'Fifth Part' have been discovered in MS Rahmani 80 (in Sharfet), MS Dawra sir. 694 and MS Dawra sir. 938 (both held in Baghdad), and Vatican MS sir. 592. Hansbury (2016) contains English translations of two discourses from the Fifth Part. There is currently no consensus among scholars about the authenticity of any of these supposed fragments of the 'Fifth Part'.

== Views on universal reconciliation ==
Scholars have noted that Isaac advocates strongly for universal salvation in the 'Second Part'. In Chapter 39 of the 'Second Part', Isaac writes, "It is not the way of the compassionate Maker to create rational beings in order to deliver them over mercilessly to unending affliction in punishment for things of which He knew even before they were fashioned, aware how they would turn out when He created them, and whom nonetheless He created." Likewise, in Chapter 5 of the 'Third Part', Isaac explains, "This is the mystery: that all creation by means of One, has been brought near to God in a mystery; then it is transmitted to all; thus all is united to Him...This action was performed for all of creation; there will, indeed, be a time when no part will fall short of the whole."

In Isaac's 'First Part' some have also seen evidence for universalist sympathies, as illustrated by the following: "God will not abandon anyone." "There was a time when sin did not exist, and there will be a time when it will not exist." "As a handful of sand thrown into the ocean, so are the sins of all flesh as compared with the mind of God; as a fountain that flows abundantly is not dammed by a handful of earth, so the compassion of the Creator is not overcome by the wickedness of the creatures... If He is compassionate here, we believe that there will be no change in Him; far be it from us that we should wickedly think that God could not possibly be compassionate; God's properties are not liable to variations as those of mortals... What is hell as compared with the grace of resurrection? Come and let us wonder at the grace of our Creator." Other passages throughout the corpus of Isaac's writings have been cited in demonstration of his belief in eventual universal salvation.

== Veneration and legacy ==
Isaac is widely regarded as a saint in several Christian traditions, including the Church of the East, the Oriental Orthodox Churches, the Eastern Orthodox Church, and the Roman Catholic Church. His feast day is observed in many Eastern Christian calendars on January 28, often together with the feast of the 4th-century theologian and hymnographer Ephrem the Syrian, reflecting long-standing liturgical commemoration across different churches. In the Syriac Orthodox tradition, his feast is celebrated on May 14.

In November 2024, Pope Francis announced the inclusion of Isaac of Nineveh in the Roman Martyrology, the official liturgical list of saints venerated by the Latin Church, following discussions with ecclesiastical leaders of the Assyrian Church of the East. This decision was explained as a recognition of his enduring spiritual legacy and of holiness extending beyond historical ecclesial divisions.

Isaac’s writings, particularly his ascetical and mystical discourses emphasizing prayer, divine mercy, and inner stillness, have had a lasting impact on Christian monasticism. These writings remain popular in monastic communities such as those on Mount Athos, and have influenced later revivals of monastic life, including within the Coptic Orthodox Church in the late 20th century.

== Translations ==
Part of Isaac's writings	Details of translation	Translation language	Notes
First Part, entire text	Mystic Treatises by Isaac of Nineveh, ed. by A. J. Wensinck, 1923 (reprinted Gorgias Press, 2011)	English	Made from the original Syriac text
First Part, entire text	The Ascetical Homilies of Saint Isaac the Syrian, ed. by Dana Miller, Rev. 2nd ed (The Holy Transfiguration Monastery, 2020)	English	Made primarily from the ancient Greek translation
Second Part, Chapters 1-3	Saint Isaac of Nineveh: Headings on Spiritual Knowledge (The Second Part, Chapters 1-3), ed. by Sebastian P. Brock, Popular Patristics, 63 (Saint Vladimir's Seminary Press, 2022).	English	
Second Part, Chapters 4-41	Isaac of Nineveh (Isaac the Syrian): ‘The Second Part’, Chapters IV-XLI, ed. by Sebastian P. Brock, Corpus Scriptorum Christianorum Orientalium: Scriptores Syri, 224–225 (Peeters, 1995)	English	
Third Part, entire text	Isaac the Syrian’s Spiritual Works, ed. by Mary Hansbury (Gorgias Press, 2016).	English	

== See also ==
- The Ascetical Homilies of Isaac the Syrian
- Anthony the Great
- Apocatastasis
- Arab Christians
- Asceticism
- Christian Universalism
- Church Fathers
- Church of the East
- Dadisho Qatraya
- East Syriac Rite
- Ephrem the Syrian
- John of the Ladder
- Monastic silence
- Philokalia
- Syriac Christianity
