= Yaroo Michael Neesan =

Assyrian priest

- Church: Assyrian Church of the East

Personal details
- Born: 1853 Urmia, Persia
- Died: 24 September 1937 (aged 83–84) United States
- Denomination: Eastern Christianity
- Spouse: Gulnaz (d. 1915); Hawa (m. 1917)
- Children: Beatrice (born 1888)
- Occupation: Priest

Yaroo Michael Neesan (1853 – September 24, 1937), also known as Jared Michael Neesan, was an Assyrian-American priest of the Assyrian Church of the East. He was among the first Assyrians to emigrate to the United States.

== Biography ==
Neesan was born in 1853 in the Urmia region of Persia.

In 1881, he emigrated to the United States to study theology.

Neesan married Gulnaz, with whom he had a daughter named Beatrice (born 1888). She was engaged to Patriarch Mar Benyamin Shimun's brother Hormizd. However, in early 1915, Hormizd was shot by Turks in Istanbul shortly before the deportation of Armenian intellectuals on 24 April 1915. Beatrice was said to have died of shock from the shooting of Bishop Mar Dinkha in February 1915 before the eyes of the Neesan family, although Coakley (1993) attributed her death to typhoid fever. Neesan's wife Gulnaz died 15 days afterwards.

In 1917, Yaroo Neesan remarried, this time to an Assyrian nurse named Hawa.

In August 1918, during the Sayfo (Assyrian genocide) of World War I, Neesan joined the Assyrians during their march to safety to Hamadan and stayed in Baqubah refugee camp near Baghdad.

He moved to Flint, Michigan in 1924, where he served as the leader of the nascent Assyrian community. In Flint, he was the priest of Mar Shimun Bar Sabbae Parish. He died on September 24, 1937, in the United States.

== Manuscripts ==
Neesan is notable for donating MS syr. e. 7 to the Bodleian Library on 29 June 1898. In April 1983, the manuscript was rediscovered by British Syriacist Sebastian P. Brock as a complete version of the Second Part of the Homilies of Isaac of Nineveh.
