= Euchologium Sinaiticum =

109-folio Old Church Slavonic euchologion in Glagolitic script

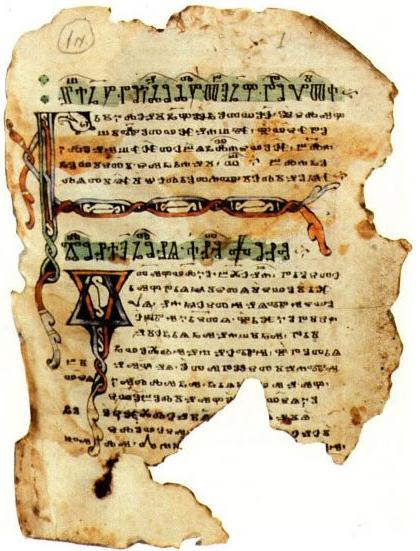
Fragment rediscovered in 1975 (Sin. slav. 1/N, f.1r)

The Euchologium Sinaiticum (scholarly abbreviation: Eu or Euch) is a 109-folio Old Church Slavonic euchologion in Glagolitic script. It contains parts of the liturgy of Saint John Chrysostom, and is dated to the 11th century. It is named after Saint Catherine's Monastery in Sinai, where it was found in the 19th century.

== Manuscripts ==
Part of the manuscript was found in Saint Catherine's Monastery in 1850 by the Russian archimandrite Porphyrius Uspensky (Sin. slav. 37), and there it's still kept today excepting the three folios taken by Uspenskij and N.P. Krylov to Saint Petersburg, Russia (NLR Ms. глаг. 2 & 3). Among the Sinai manuscripts discovered in 1975 is a 28-folio fragment of the Euchologium Sinaiticum (Sin. slav. 1/N).

== Editions ==
It was first published by Czech L. Geitler in 1882 in Zagreb. In the edition Patrologia Orientalis (t. XXIV, fasc. 5, 1933, p. 605-802 and t. XXV, fasc. 3, 1939, p. 487-617) it was published by J. Frček. Slovene Slavist R. Nahtigal published a facsimile edition it in Ljubljana in 1941, and in 1942 in a Cyrillic transcription. A facsimile edition of the recent discoveries of Euchologium fragmenta has been published by I. C. Tarnanidis: The Slavonic Manuscripts Discovered in 1975. at St. Catherine's Monastery on Mount Sinai (Thessaloniki, 1988).

== Context ==
Researchers emphasize that the manuscript is a collection of diverse prayers of different origins: some of them are scribed to the pre-Cyrillo-Methodian Salzburg mission, and for others it's being claimed that they represent Eastern-rite missal fragments. We don't know much of its language: nasal vowels are well-preserved, there is no notation of palatalism in syllabic sonorants r and l, strong yers are sometimes preserved, and sometimes vocalized (ъ > o, ь > e), weak yers are sometimes omitted, Jagić's rule is confirmed etc.

== See also ==
- List of Glagolitic manuscripts

== Source ==
- "Sinai, Saint Catherine's Monastery, Ms. Slav. 37". “Euchologion sinaiticum” (Eu, Euch) – Glagolitic euchologion with extracts of the divine liturgies and other rituals, probably copied at Preslav (11th-century).
