= John of Dalyatha =

John of Dalyatha (c. 690 – c. 780), commonly known as John Saba ("the Elder") and in Syriac Yoḥannan, was a monk and mystic of the Church of the East. He spent his entire life in Upper Mesopotamia, alternating between coenobitic (community-based) and eremitic (solitary) monasticism, with a preference for the latter. At the time of his death, he was serving as the abbot of a community of monks.

John was a prolific writer in Syriac. A great number of his sermons, treatises, maxims and letters have survived. Translated into several languages in the centuries after his death, they were rarely read within the Church of the East (even being banned between the 780s and the 820s) but circulated widely in other Christian traditions throughout Asia, Africa and Europe.

== Life ==
The 14th-century Syriac writer ʿAbdishoʿ bar Brikha, in his Catalogue of Books, mistakenly dated John of Dalyatha's life to the first half of the 6th century. This was widely accepted into the 20th century, when it was finally demonstrated that John in fact belongs to the 8th century.

John was born around 690 in the village of Ardamut, northeast of Mosul in the Syriac-speaking region of Beth Nuhadra, part of the Syrian province of the Umayyad Caliphate. As a child, he studied the Bible, liturgy and patristics in the local church in preparation for a priestly or monastic vocation. As a youth, he paid regular visits to the monastery of Mar Aphnimaran to read ascetic literature, and he practised fasting and keeping vigils. When he was old enough he entered the coenobitic monastery of Mar Yozadaq in the mountains of Beth Qardu. He may have been drawn to this monastery because it had been that of the Syriac writer Narsai over a century earlier. As a novice he was under the instruction of a certain Blessed Stephen, himself a disciple of Mar Yozadaq.

After seven years living in the community of Mar Yozadaq, John received permission to live as a hermit. He retreated north to the mountains of Beth Dalyatham—the "house of the vine-branches" or "vine-shoots"—at an elevation of 3,000 metres (9,800 ft). In his writings, John mentions his mountainous surrounding only once, in Letter 37. Because he spent most of his life in solitude and is not known to have ever visited a town, he probably never met a Muslim nor heard the Muslim call to prayer, the adhān.

In his old age, when he was too weak to continue on his own, John returned to Beth Qardu. A community of monks gathered around him and elected him their abbot or superior. As abbot he created a new rule for novices. He served as abbot until his death around 780.

Because John belonged to a monastic circle accused, probably incorrectly, of the heresies of Messalianism and Sabellianism, his works were banned after his death by the Patriarch Timothy I at a synod held in 786/787 or 790. Joseph Hazzaya was condemned at the same synod. John was later rehabilitated by the Patriarch Ishoʿbar Nun (governed 823–828).

== Writings ==
John left behind 25 sermons (or discourses) and 51 letters, as well as a set of maxims (kephalaia) called the Ru'us al-Ma'rifah, variously translated Chapters of Understanding, Chapters of Wisdom or Kephalaia on Knowledge.

Probably because of the condemnation of Timothy I, his writings survive in their original language (Syriac) only in manuscripts of the Syriac Orthodox tradition opposed to the Church of the East. They largely circulated anonymously, attributed only to the "spiritual elder", "divine elder" or just "elder", although there are some attributed to "Mar John the Elder", mar being a Syriac honorific meaning saint or reverend. Only in the 15th century did scholars begin to identify the author of the works as either John of Dalyatha or John bar Penkaye. Modern scholars are in general agreement that the first identification is correct, although Brian Colless has suggested that the two Johns are one and the same person.

Many of John's works were translated into Arabic, Ethiopic (Ge'ez) and Greek. Four of his sermons falsely attributed to Isaac of Nineveh and his Letter 15 falsely attributed to Dorotheus of Gaza were translated into Greek, and thence into Latin and other European languages during the Middle Ages.

John's works were all written for the benefit of ascetics. They discuss monastic living and the glory and beauty of God. He had a strong perfectionist streak. His recommended path took a devotee through repentance, ascetic exercises, purity, serenity and finally perfection, relying heavily on Matthew 5:48 ("Be perfect as your heavenly Father is perfect") and Matthew 5:8 ("Blessed are the pure in heart, for they shall see God"). Ever the mystic, he clarifies that the pure shall see God only "in their heart".

== Sources ==
- Albert, Micheline (2005) [2002]. "John of Dalyatha or John Sabas". In André Vauchez (ed.). Encyclopedia of the Middle Ages. James Clarke & Co.
- Beulay, Robert (1977–78). "Précisions touchant l'identité et la biographie de Jean Saba de Dalyatha". Parole de l'Orient. 8: 103–116.
- Colless, Brian Edric (1969). The Mysticism of John Saba (PhD thesis). University of Melbourne.
- Colless, Brian Edric (1972). "The Biographies of John Saba" (PDF). Parole de l'Orient. 3 (1): 45–63.
- Colless, Brian Edric (1973). "The Mysticism of John Saba". Orientalia Christiana Periodica. 39 (1): 83–102.
- Colless, Brian Edric (2011). "Yoḥannan of Dalyatha". In Sebastian P. Brock; Aaron M. Butts; George A. Kiraz; Lucas Van Rompay (eds.). Gorgias Encyclopedic Dictionary of the Syriac Heritage: Electronic Edition. Gorgias Press.
- Cross, F. L.; Livingstone, E. A., eds. (2009) [2005]. "John of Dalyatha". The Oxford Dictionary of the Christian Church (3rd rev. ed.). Oxford University Press. ISBN 978-0-19-280290-3.
- Frederick, Vincent (1991). "John Sabas". In Aziz Suryal Atiya (ed.). The Coptic Encyclopedia. Vol. 4. New York: Macmillan Publishers. p. 1369a.
- Hansbury, Mary T., ed. (2006). The Letters of John of Dalyatha. Gorgias Press.
- Pinggéra, Karl (2018). "John of Dalyatha". In Nicholson, Oliver (ed.). The Oxford Dictionary of Late Antiquity, Volume 2: J–Z. Oxford: Oxford University Press. pp. 827–28. ISBN 978-0-19-881625-6.
- Seppälä, Serafim (2003). "In Speechless Ecstacy: Expression and Interpretation of Mystical Experience in Classical Syriac and Sufi Literature". Studia Orientalia. 98 (Back Issue).
- Treiger, Alexander (2009). "Could Christ's Humanity See His Divinity? An Eighth-Century Controversy between John of Dalyatha and Timothy I, Catholicos of the Church of the East". Journal of the Canadian Society for Syriac Studies. 9: 3–21. doi:10.31826/jcsss-2009-090103. S2CID 212688240.
- Wilmshurst, David (2011). The Martyred Church: A History of the Church of the East. East and West Publishing.
