= Synaxaire Arabe-Jacobite =

Volume containing biographies of several saints

18th-century manuscript, dated 1733 in the colophon, called as Al-Sinkisār (Synaxarion), from the Syriac Orthodox archdiocese of Aleppo

Jacobite Arab Synaxarium or Synaxaire Arabe-Jacobite is a volume containing biographies of several saints. It is used by the Syriac Orthodox Church. It was initially published in French in 1904, in the Patrologia Orientalis by René Basset. It is not to be confused with the Coptic Synaxarium, although some of the hagiographies appear to be identical and they both use the Egyptian Calendar. Variations have been found, with additional Nubian Church material in them, albeit in fragmentary form. Some of these saints include:

- Abadios, a martyr of the Christian church. He was born at Bilgai in Egypt. He was a native soldier of the army who professed his faith in Jesus Christ during the reign of Diocletian at Khalakhis. He was martyred by being thrown into a rock. His feast day is on January 20.
- Abakuh (also known as Apa Kauh), another martyr of the Christian church. He was born at Bamujeh in the Al Fayyum area of Egypt. He was a zealous Christian who was martyred for his Christianity with eight companions. His feast day is January 23.
