= John of Apamea =

5th-century Syriac Christian writer

- Born: c. 5th century AD
- Died: c. 5th century AD

John of Apamea (Syriac: ܝܘܚܢܢ ܕܐܘܦܡܝܐ), John the Solitary (Syriac: ܝܘܚܢܢ ܝܚܝܕܝܐ, romanized: Yoḥannan Iḥidaya), or John the Solitary of Apamea was a 5th-century Syriac Christian writer from Apamea, Syria.

His writings are strongly influenced by Evagrius Ponticus's works, which were available to him via Syriac translations of the time. In turn, John of Apamea's works have influenced Isaac the Syrian, a prolific 7th-century Syriac Christian mystical writer.

== Name ==
In Syriac, John the Solitary is known as Yoḥannan Iḥidaya (ܝܘܚܢܢ ܝܚܝܕܝܐ). Iḥidāyā (ܝܺܚܺܝܕܳܝܳܐ), derived from the root yḥd ‘one’, translates to 'solitary', 'alone', 'monk', or 'hermit'. The Greek equivalent is μοναχός (monachós).

== Historic identity ==
The identity of the historic John of Apamea is controversial. Some scholars have proposed that he may have in fact been two or three separate individuals.

John the Solitary of Apamea is not to be confused with two other people also called "John of Apamea":

- John of Apamea, also known as John/Yoḥannan the Egyptian (fl. 5th century A.D.), a writer condemned as a heretic by Philoxenus of Mabbug
- John of Apamea (fl. 8th century A.D.), a writer condemned as a heretic under Timothy I of Seleucia-Ctesiphon, the Patriarch of the Church of the East

== Silent prayer ==
John of Apamea is known for his innovative ideas on silent prayer. Ashkelony (2012) states that John of Apamea is the earliest known Christian writer to systematically write about a theory of silent prayer. In the Dialogue on the Soul, John of Apamea proposes that the three stages (or levels) of silent prayer are those of the body, soul, and finally, the spirit. As such, there are three levels of stillness. The first is the cessation of speech; the second is the stillness of the soul in which the mind no longer has to fight distracting thoughts; and last of all, the stillness of the spirit in which stillness passes beyond the soul or ego.

== Writings ==
Below is a comprehensive bibliography of writings by John of Apamea, from Sebastian Brock (1995).

- Commentary on Qohelet (Ecclesiastes)
- Kephalaia
- Letters
- Letter to Hesychius
- On Prayer
- Questions
- Dialogue on the Soul
- Dialogues with Thaumasios
- Tractates

=== BL Add. 17170 ===
BL Add. 17170 (i.e., British Library Additional Manuscript 17170) is an Estrangela Syriac manuscript dated to 774-5 AD with 88 vellum leaves that contains various writings of John of Apamea. There are two columns of text on each page. Below are various texts attributed to John of Apamea in the manuscript, as cited in Strothmann (1972):

- End of Second Discourse on the New World
- Discourse on the fulfilment of the future promises
- Questions and answers
- Discourses on the Beatitudes
- Discourse on Romans 8:18
- Discourse on Ephesians 6:11
- Exhortation to love
- Rules and orders
- Exhortation to virtue
- Consolatory address to those persecuted for Christ's sake
- Letter to Marcianus
- Letter to Hesychius
- Letter of Thaumasios to John
- Three discourses on the mystery of the dispensation of Christ, addressed to Thaumasios
- Letter of John to Thaumasios
- Beatitudes

== See also ==
- Isaac the Syrian
