= Micheline Albert =

Micheline Albert (1925–2014) was a French Syriac scholar. After earlier degrees in physics and chemistry she studied under André Dupont-Sommer, François Graffin, Antoine Guillaumont and later François Dolbeau, becoming the director of research of the French Centre national de la recherche scientifique. Micheline Albert was involved with Michel Tardieu and Alain Le Boulluec in the Laboratoire des Etudes Monothéistes where she directed the Christianismes Orientaux team. Albert worked successively on James of Sarug, Philoxenus of Mabbug, Sophronius of Jerusalem (with the future Cardinal Christoph Schönborn of Vienna), Dadisho Qatraya, Joseph Hazzaya and Barhebraeus, which she regularly presented in Guillaumont's Ecole Pratique des Hautes Etudes seminars. She was married with five children.

== Selected publications ==
- Histoire "Acéphale": et, Index syriaque des Lettres festales d'Athanase d'Alexandrie, Cerf, 1985 (Sources Chrétiennes 317)
- Christianismes orientaux. Introduction à l'étude des langues et des littératures, Cerf 1993
