= Gregory of Cyprus (monk) =

Gregory of Cyprus was a Persian monk, mystic and writer of the Church of the East. Born at Ahvaz in the 6th century, he spent a period of exile working as a gardener for a Greek Orthodox monastery on the island of Cyprus. He afterwards settled on Mount Izla.

Gregory had a reputation for receiving visions. His known writings, all in Syriac, include:

- Chapters on Prayer
- Treatise on the Monastic Life, of which only the seventh and last book, "On Divine Contemplation", survives
- three letters, one to a disciple named Epiphanios

Gregory is sometimes misidentified as the author of the Revelation of Saint Gregory. Gregory's writings were also used in the Syriac Orthodox Church.

== Bibliography ==
- Brock, Sebastian (2018) [2011]. "Grigorios of Cyprus". In Sebastian Brock; Aaron M. Butts; George A. Kiraz; Lucas Van Rompay (eds.). Gorgias Encyclopedic Dictionary of the Syriac Heritage: Electronic Edition. Beth Mardutho [Gorgias Press].
- Perczel, Istvan (2013). "The Revelation of the Seraphic Gregory Found in Two Indian Manuscripts" (PDF). Adamantius. 19: 337–358.
- Pirtea, Adrian (2018). "The Mysticism of the Church of the East". In Daniel King (ed.). The Syriac World. Routledge. pp. 355–376.
