= Isho'dnah =

Persian historian and hagiographer

Ishoʿdnaḥ (Syriac: ܝܫܘܥܕܢܚ; fl. 9th century) was a historian and hagiographer of the Church of the East who served as the metropolitan bishop of Mayshan at Baṣra. Some manuscripts refer to him as metropolitan of the diocese of Qasra, but this appears to be a simple spelling error, since Qasra was never a metropolitan see.

Ishoʿdnaḥ wrote in Syriac. According to ʿAbdishoʿ bar Brikha, writing towards 1300, he wrote a three-volume ecclesiastical history, a treatise on logic, hymns, poems and consolations, as well as "a treatise on chastity, in which he collected an account of all the saints." The last is one of only two works by Ishoʿdnaḥ known to have been preserved. The other is an acrostic poem about Mar Yawnan, the founder of a monastery near al-Anbār, in 22 stanzas. The former has been published in full, but only a few stanzas of the latter.

The Ktābā d-nakputā ("Book of Chastity"), also known by its Latin title, Liber castitatis, was written around 860. It contains 140 brief biographical notices of ascetic saints, mostly the founders of monasteries in northern Mesopotamia in the late Sasanian and early Arab periods, between about 580 and 660. The earliest is Mar Awgen of the 4th century, while the latest is from the mid-9th century. The latest event he refers to is the translation of the monk Ishoʿzka in "the third year of Jaʿfar, son of Muʿtaṣim, king of the Arabs [Ṭayyāyē]", that is, 849–850. Although several manuscript copies now exist, all derive from a single late 19th-century copy. It is untitled in the manuscripts. Its conventional title is taken from ʿAbdishoʿ. In the heading identifying Ishoʿdnaḥ as the author, the scribe notes that he "write[s] the stories in brief of all those fathers who founded convents in the kingdom of the Persians and Arabs", which may indicate either that the notices he was copying were brief or perhaps that he (i.e., the copyist) was abridging them. It is possible, therefore, that the work which survives is an abridgement. The existing text also omits some Jacobite founders known from descriptions of the work to have been part of the original.

Ishoʿdnaḥ's lost ecclesiastical history was written around 850. Elias of Nisibis cites it seventeen times, but for no event earlier than 624 or later than 714. Among the events he is known to have recorded are the death of Shah Khusrau II and the accession of Kavad II (628); ʿUmar's capture of Jerusalem (637); the death of the Emperor Heraclonas and the accession of Constans II (641); Muʿāwiya I's initiation of naval warfare against Byzantium (647); the first Arab civil war (656–661); Constans II's campaign against the Slavs in 660; and Constans II's murder of his brother Theodosius that same year. The Jacobite historians Michael Rabo and Bar Hebraeus cite an otherwise unknown Dnaḥ Ishoʿ the Nestorian for an event of 793, and this may be a garbled reference to Ishoʿdnaḥ.

Pierre Nautin proposed that Ishoʿdnaḥ was the author of the anonymous Arabic Chronicle of Siirt. Jean Maurice Fiey suggests, however, that they author of the Chronicle merely had access to some of the same sources as Ishoʿdnaḥ. Robert Hoyland considers it unlikely that Ishoʿdnaḥ lived long enough into the 10th century to have completed the Chronicle of Siirt. The most likely place for Ishoʿdnaḥ in the list of known metropolitans of Baṣra is between Daniel (853) and Gabriel (884), although it is possible that he reigned earlier, his pontificate ending between 849 and 853.

== Bibliography ==
- Badger, G. P., ed. (1852). The Nestorians and Their Rituals. Vol. 2. London: Joseph Masters. ISBN 9780790544823.
- Bedjan, Paul, ed. (1901). Liber Superiorum, seu Historia Monastica, auctore Thoma, episcopo Margensi. Leipzig: Otto Harrassowitz.
- Brock, Sebastian P. (2011). "Ishoʿdnaḥ". In Sebastian P. Brock; Aaron M. Butts; George A. Kiraz; Lucas Van Rompay (eds.). Gorgias Encyclopedic Dictionary of the Syriac Heritage. Gorgias Press. Online edition by Beth Mardutho, 2018.
- Chabot, Jean-Baptiste (1896). "Le livre de la Chasteté composé par Jésusdenah, Évêque de Baçrah". Mélanges d'archéologie et d'histoire. 16: 1–79, 225–291. Archived
- Fiey, Jean Maurice (1966). "Îchôʿdnah, métropolite de Basra, et son oeuvre". L'Orient Syrien. 11: 431–450.
- Fiey, Jean Maurice (1975–76). "Īšōʻdnāḥ et la Chronique de Séert" (PDF). Parole de l'Orient. 6–7: 447–459.
- Guidi, Ignazio (1892). "Bemerkingen zum ersten Bande der syrischen Acta Martyrum et Sanctorum". Zeitschrift der Deutschen Morgenländischen Gesellschaft. 46: 744–758.
- Hoyland, Robert G. (1997). Seeing Islam As Others Saw It: A Survey and Evaluation of Christian, Jewish and Zoroastrian Writings on Early Islam. Princeton, NJ: Darwin Press.
- Nautin, Pierre (1974). "L'auteur de la Chronique de Séert: Išōʿdenaḥ de Baṣra". Revue de l'histoire des religions. 186 (2): 113–126. doi:10.3406/rhr.1974.10215.(with 199 [1982]: 313–314).
- Nicholson, O. P. (2018). "Liber Castitatis". In Nicholson, Oliver (ed.). The Oxford Dictionary of Late Antiquity, Volume 2: J–Z. Oxford: Oxford University Press. pp. 905–906. ISBN 978-0-19-881625-6.
- Wood, Philip (2013). The Chronicle of Seert: Christian Historical Imagination in Late Antique Iraq. Oxford: Oxford University Press.
- Wright, William (1894). A Short History of Syriac Literature (PDF). Adam and Charles Black.
