= Imru al-Qays (disambiguation) =

Imru' al-Qais (496–565) was a pre-Islamic Arabian poet. Imru al-Qays may refer to:

- Amru Al-Qays (crater), Mercury
- Imru al-Qays I ibn Amr (r. 295–328), second Lakhmid king
- Amr ibn Imru al-Qays (r. 328–363), third Lakhmid king
- Imru al-Qays II ibn Amr (r. 368–390), fifth Lakhmid king
- Al-Nu'man I ibn Imru al-Qays (r. 390–418), sixth Lakhmid king
- Al-Mundhir ibn Imru al-Qays (r. 503–554), twelfth Lakhmid king
- Rubab bint Imru al-Qais (d. 681), first wife of Husayn ibn Ali
- K. Muhammad Emrul Kayesh (born 1966), Bangladeshi High Court justice
- Imrul Kayes (born 1987), Bangladeshi international cricketer

== See also ==
- Qais
- Imrul Karim
