= 328 =

328 in various calendars
- Gregorian calendar: 328; CCCXXVIII
- Ab urbe condita: 1081
- Assyrian calendar: 5078
- Balinese saka calendar: 249–250
- Bengali calendar: −266 – −265
- Berber calendar: 1278
- Buddhist calendar: 872
- Burmese calendar: −310
- Byzantine calendar: 5836–5837
- Chinese calendar: 丁亥年 (Fire Pig); 3025 or 2818 — to — 戊子年 (Earth Rat); 3026 or 2819
- Coptic calendar: 44–45
- Discordian calendar: 1494
- Ethiopian calendar: 320–321
- Hebrew calendar: 4088–4089
- Hindu calendars
- Vikram Samvat: 384–385
- Shaka Samvat: 249–250
- Kali Yuga: 3428–3429
- Holocene calendar: 10328
- Iranian calendar: 294 BP – 293 BP
- Islamic calendar: 303 BH – 302 BH
- Javanese calendar: 209–210
- Julian calendar: 328; CCCXXVIII
- Korean calendar: 2661
- Minguo calendar: 1584 before ROC 民前1584年
- Nanakshahi calendar: −1140
- Seleucid era: 639/640 AG
- Thai solar calendar: 870–871
- Tibetan calendar: མེ་མོ་ཕག་ལོ་ (female Fire-Boar); 454 or 73 or −699 — to — ས་ཕོ་བྱི་བ་ལོ་ (male Earth-Rat); 455 or 74 or −698

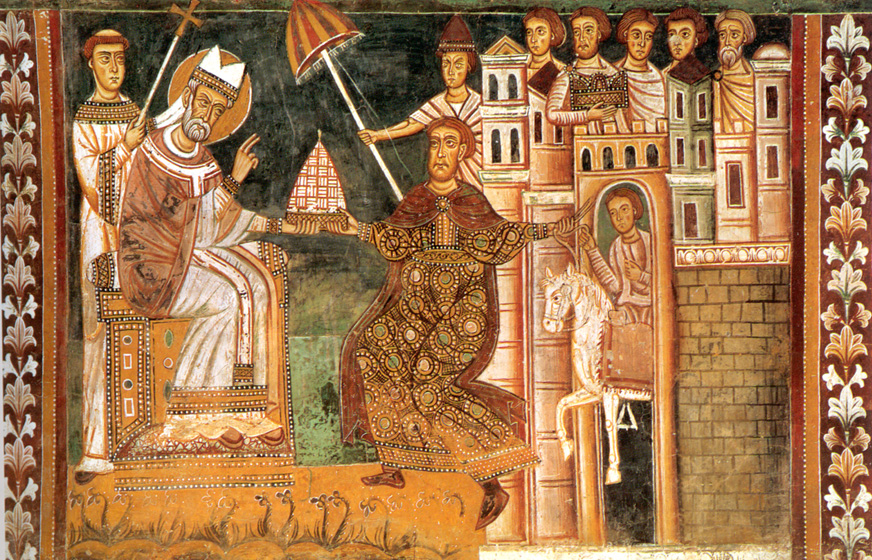
Pope Sylvester I and Emperor Constantine the Great

Year 328 (CCCXXVIII) was a leap year starting on Monday of the Julian calendar. At the time, it was known as the Year of the Consulship of Ianuarinus and Iustus (or, less frequently, year 1081 Ab urbe condita). The denomination 328 for this year has been used since the early medieval period, when the Anno Domini calendar era became the prevalent method in Europe for naming years.

== Events ==
=== By place ===
==== Roman Empire ====
- July 5 – Constantine's Bridge, built over the Danube between Sucidava (Corabia, Romania) and Oescus (Gigen, Bulgaria), is officially opened by the Roman architect Theophilus Patricius.
- December 7 – Lakhmid king Imru' al-Qays ibn 'Amr dies. His epitaph, the Namara inscription, is an important source for the Arabic Language.

=== By topic ===
==== Religion ====
- May 9 – Athanasius is elected pope of Alexandria following the death of Alexander I.

== Births ==
- Flavius Julius Valens, Roman emperor (d. 378)
- Huan Chong, Chinese general and governor (d. 384)
- Yuan Hong, Chinese historian and politician (d. 376)

== Deaths ==
- Alexander I, pope and patriarch of Alexandria
- Papa (or Papa bar Aggai), Sassanid bishop
- Su Jun, Chinese general and politician
- Yu Wenjun, Chinese empress (b. 297)
