= Amr ibn Imru al-Qays =

Third Lakhmid king (328–363)

- King of the Lakhmid state
- Reign: CE 328–363
- Predecessor: Imru al-Qays I ibn Amr
- Successor: Aws ibn Qallam
- Died: 363
- Issue: Imru' al-Qays II ibn 'Amr
- House: Lakhmids
- Father: Imru al-Qays I ibn Amr

Amr ibn Imru al-Qays ibn Amr (Arabic: عمرو بن امرؤ القيس, romanized: ʿAmr ibn Imruʾ al-Qays ibn ʿAmr), commonly known as Amr II, was the third king of the Lakhmid Kingdom of al-Hirah, ruling from 328 to 363. A son of the famed Imru al-Qays I who had defected to the Roman Empire, he returned to Sasanian allegiance.

His mother was Mariya al-Barriyah, a sister of the Ghassanid king Tha'laba ibn 'Amr. 'Amr was very active in the wars of his Sassanid Persian overlords against the Romans, and was even nicknamed "warmonger" for the wars he engaged in. In 337 AD the Persian shah Shapur II harassed the Roman borders and commissioned the Arabs to attack and invade as well.
