= Graeco-Arabic translation movement =

8th–10th century translation efforts

The Graeco-Arabic translation movement was a large, well-funded, and sustained effort responsible for translating a significant volume of secular Greek texts into Arabic. The translation movement took place in Baghdad from the mid-eighth century to the late tenth century.

During the movement, texts from many other languages such as Pahlavi, Sanskrit, and Syriac were also translated into Arabic. Despite this, it is primarily associated with Greek translation because it was predominantly focused on the works of Hellenistic scholars.

== Pre-Abbasid developments ==
=== Pre-Islamic developments ===
The second king of the Sasanian Empire, Shapur I, established the Academy of Gondishapur, which was to be a medical center, a library, as well as a college where various subjects like anatomy, theology, medicine, and philosophy would be studied. Later, Khosrow I established an observatory that could offer studies in dentistry, architecture, agriculture and irrigation, basics of commanding in military, astronomy, and mathematics. The Academy of Gondishapur was then considered as the greatest crucial center of medicine during the sixth as well as the seventh century. However, during the seventh century CE, the Sasanian Empire was conquered by the Muslim armies, but they preserved the center.

Further west, the Byzantine emperor Justinian I closed the Academy of Athens in 529. Along with the defunding of key public educational institutions, many scholars fled the region with their knowledge and materials. These migrant scholars sought asylum in Persia, whose ruler actively ensured their safe passage out of Byzantium and supported their academic ambitions.

=== Early Islamic Empire and Umayyad Period (632–750) ===
Although Greek to Arabic translations were common during the Umayyad Period due to large Greek-speaking populations residing in the empire, the translation of Greek scientific texts was scarce. The Graeco-Arabic translation movement began, in earnest, at the beginning of the Abbasid Period. However, many events and conditions during the rise of the Islamic empire helped to shape the setting and circumstances in which the movement blossomed. The Arab conquests before and during the Umayyad Period that spread into Southwest Asia, Persia, and Northeast Africa laid the groundwork for a civilization capable of fueling the Graeco-Arabic translation movement. These conquests united a massive area under the Islamic State, connecting societies and peoples previously isolated, invigorating trade routes and agriculture, and improving material wealth among subjects. The newfound regional stability under the Umayyad dynasty likely fostered higher literacy rates and a larger educational infrastructure. Syriac-speaking Christians and other Hellenistic Christian communities in Iraq and Iran were assimilated into the structure of the empire. These Hellenized peoples were crucial in supporting a growing institutional interest in secular Greek learning.

== Abbasid Period (750–1258) ==
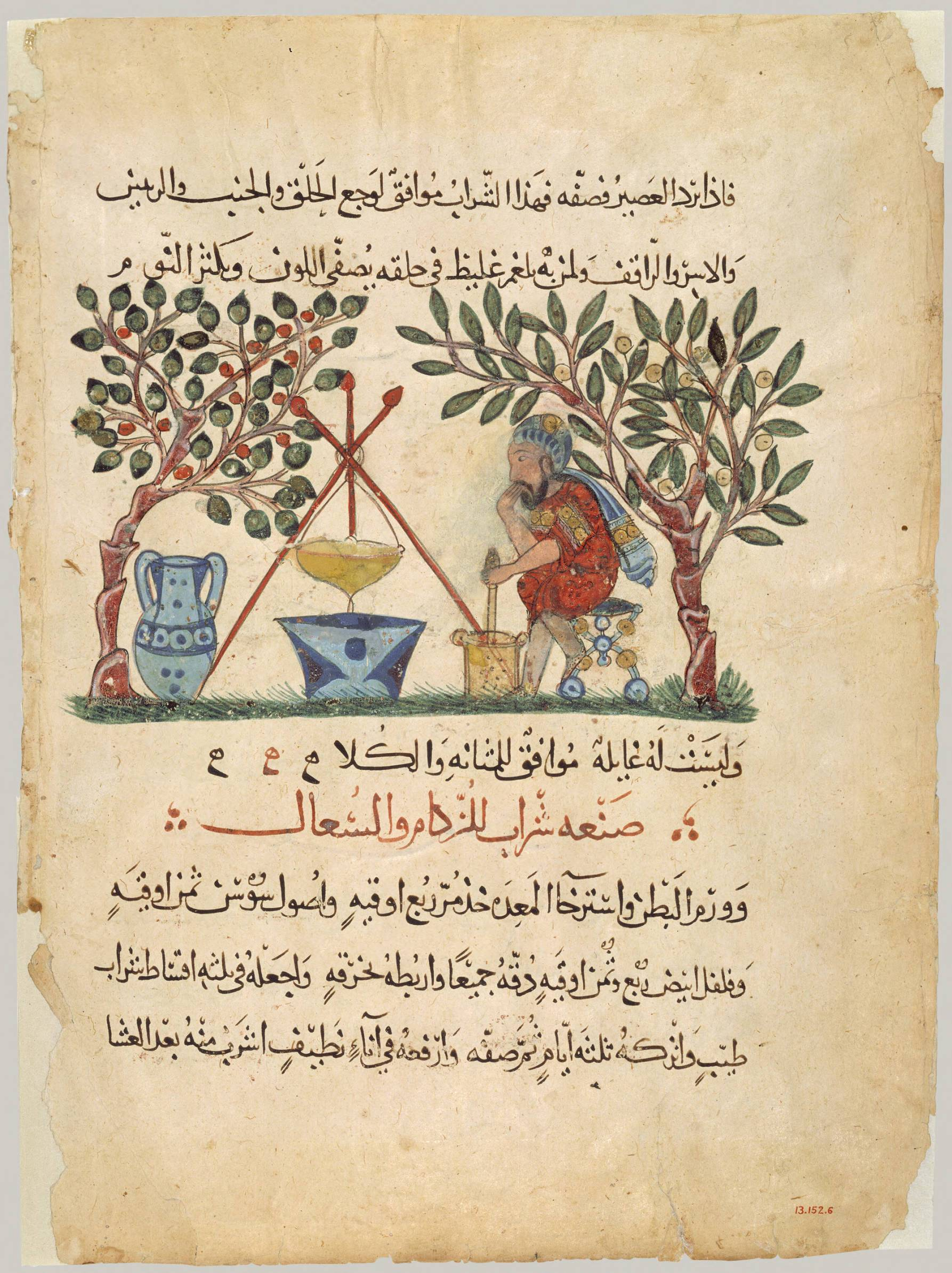
Leaf from an Arabic translation of the Materia Medica of Dioscorides, treating the "Preparation of Medicine from Honey", 1224

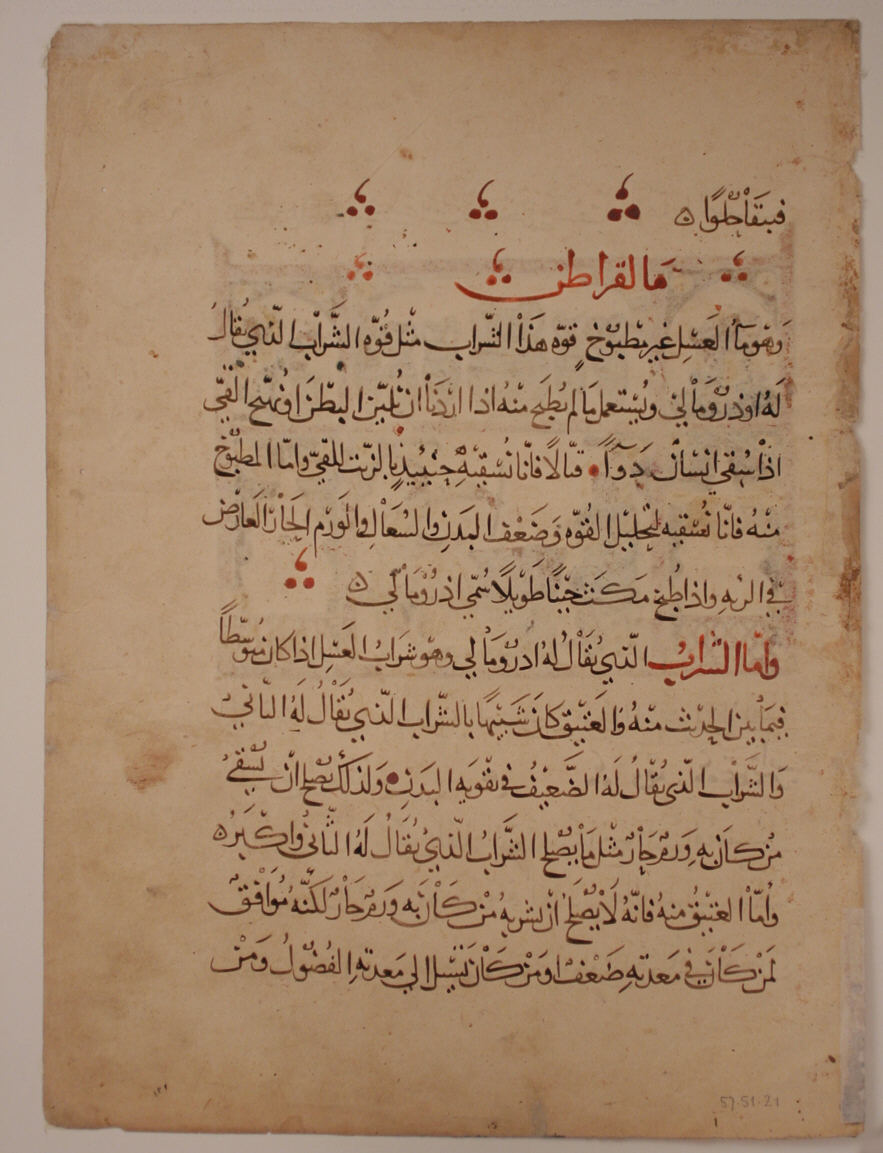
"Preparing Medicine from Honey", from a dispersed manuscript of De Materia Medica, 1224

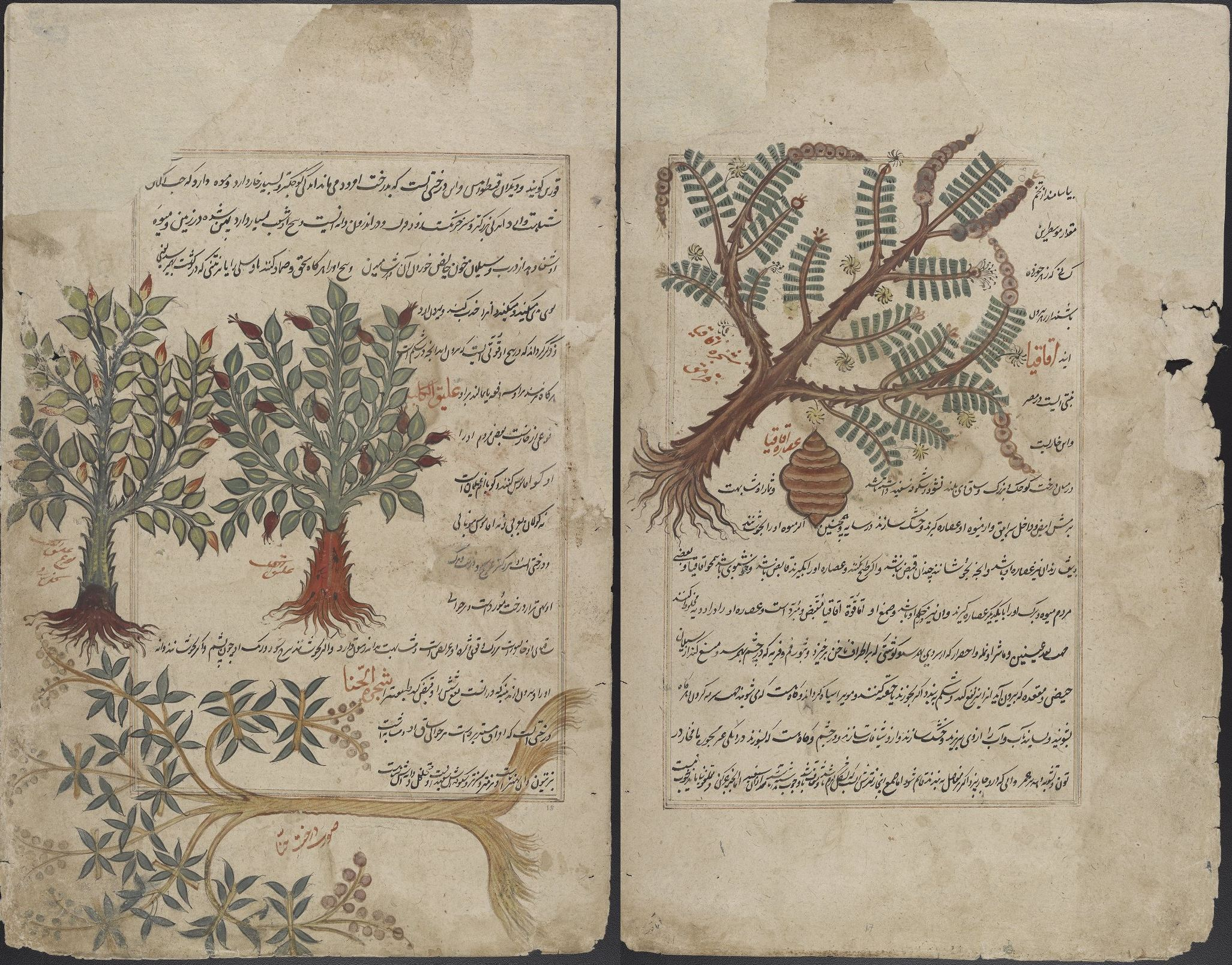
Persian Translation of Pedanius Dioscorides, 16th century

The Abbasid revolution and the move to a new capital in Baghdad introduced the ruling administration to a new set of demographic populations more influenced by Hellenism. At the same time, the ruling elite of the new dynasty strove to adopt a Sassanian Imperial Ideology, which itself was also influenced by Greek thought. These factors culminated in a capital more receptive to and actively interested in the knowledge contained in scientific manuscripts of Classical Greece. The translation movement played a significant role in the Islamic Golden Age.

The advent and rapid spread of papermaking learned from Chinese prisoners of war in 751 also helped to make the translation movement possible.

During the early Abbasid period, Arabic lacked a long-standing tradition of translating Greek scientific and philosophical works. Syriac-speaking Christian scholars, however, had preserved and translated many Greek texts into Syriac over several centuries. Abbasid caliphs drew upon this existing expertise by commissioning experienced translators—including many Christians, alongside other scholars—to produce Arabic versions of Greek works, sometimes through Syriac intermediaries and sometimes directly from Greek. Over time, Muslim, Christian, Sabian, and Jewish scholars together expanded this translation movement. As Arabic became the principal scholarly language of the empire, the focus shifted beyond translation to commentary, criticism, and original contributions in philosophy, medicine, mathematics, and astronomy.

The Abbasid period encompassed one of the very critical markers in the movement's history, that is, the translation of the central texts of the Islamic religion, in this case, the Quran. The translation movement in the Arab World was greatly supported under the Islamic rule, and led to the translation of materials to Arabic from different languages like middle Persian. The translation movement was instigated by the Barmakids. The second Abbasid caliph al-Mansur (r. 754–775) used translation as an ideology to cement the fractures within an emergent empire and produce a common sense. Whilst attempting to reconcile the rival factions, he had to appeal to one of the dominant factions that brought the Abbasids to power, the Persians, by promoting the idea that the Abbasid empire was the legitimate successor of the Sasanians.

The movement succeeded in forming civilization overlap and initiated new maps in the fields of culture and politics. Islamic rulers participated in the movement in numerous ways, for example, creating classes for translation to facilitate its flow all through the various phases of the Islamic empires. The translation movement had a significant effect on developing the scientific knowledge of the Arabs as they gathered knowledge and learned from Hellenistic and ancient Greek sources. Later, there was the introduction of the western culture to the Arabic translations that were preserved since most of their initial scripts could not be located.

One of Muhammad's contemporaries, an Arab doctor named Harith b. Kalada, is said to have studied in the medical academy at Gondeshapur, however this story is likely legendary. When Muhammad died in 632, caliphs that were considered Rightly Guided Caliphs were chosen to lead the Empire of Islam, the information of the Quran was becoming more known in the surrounding civilizations. There was an expansion of the Islamic empire, leading to searching of multilingual teachers as well as people to translate and teach the Quran and the Arabic language. Later, the Quran would be incorporated into one language.

Hunayn ibn Ishaq, a polyglot who was considered to be fluent in almost all the targeted languages, was regarded as among the greatest translators during that time. He majored in the medical field. Through a hand from his son, Ishaq Hunayn, as well as his nephew, Habash, he translated more than ninety-five pieces of Galen, almost fifteen pieces of Hippocrates, about the soul, and about generation as well as corruption. The Arabic language extensively expanded to reach communities in places such as Morocco and Andalusia and would later be adapted as their language that was regarded as official. The Umayyad caliphs greatly helped in translating science as well as arts, which gave out a long-term foundation for the Empire of Islam. While Islam expanded, there was the preservation of other cultures by the Muslims and the utilization of technology and their knowledge of science in the efforts of stimulating their language to develop.

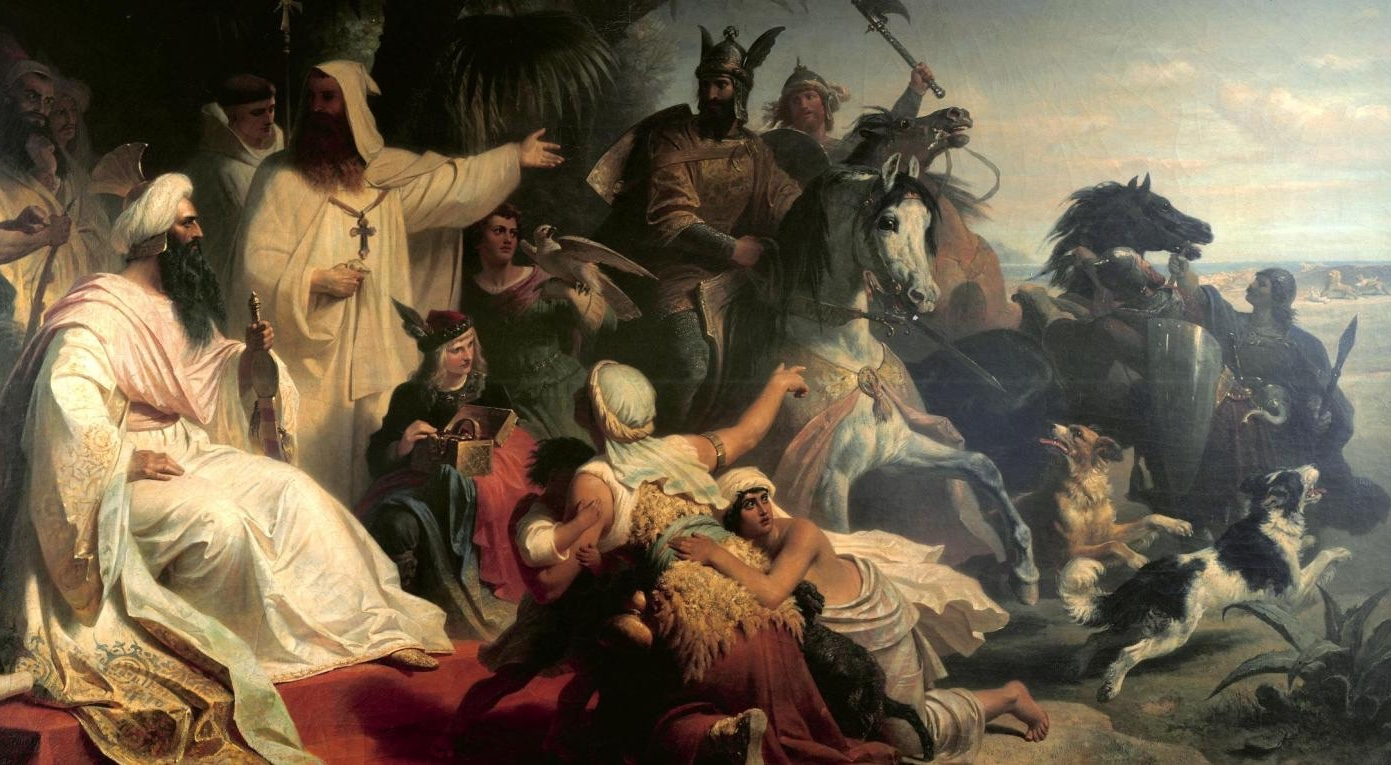
Julius Köckert: Harun al-Rashid receiving a delegation from Charlemagne in 768, oil on canvas (1864; Maximilianeum, Munich)

=== The House of Wisdom ===
The "House of Wisdom" (Bayt al-Hikmah) was a major intellectual center during the reign of the Abbasids and was a major component of the Translation Movement and the Islamic Golden Age. The library was filled with many different authors and translated books from the Greek, Persian, and Indian civilizations.

The translation process in the House of Wisdom was very meticulous. Depending on the area of study of a certain book that was being translated, a specific person or group of people would be responsible for those translations. In example, the translation of engineering and mathematical works was overseen by Abū Jaʿfar Ibn Mūsa Ibn Shākir and his family, translations of philosophy and celestial movement was given to Ibn Farkhān al-Tabarī and Yaʿqūb al-Kindī, and Ibn Ishāq al-Harānī was in charge of translations involving the study of medicine. These translators were also from many different cultural, religious, and ethnic backgrounds, including Persians, Christians, and Muslims, all working to develop a well-rounded inventory of educational literature in the House of Wisdom for the Abbasid Caliphate. Once translation was finished the books would need to be copied and bound. The translation would be sent to an individual with very precise and skillful handwriting abilities. When finished, the pages would be bound together with a cover and decorated and would be catalogued and placed in a specific ward of the library. Multiple copies of the book would also be made to be distributed across the empire.

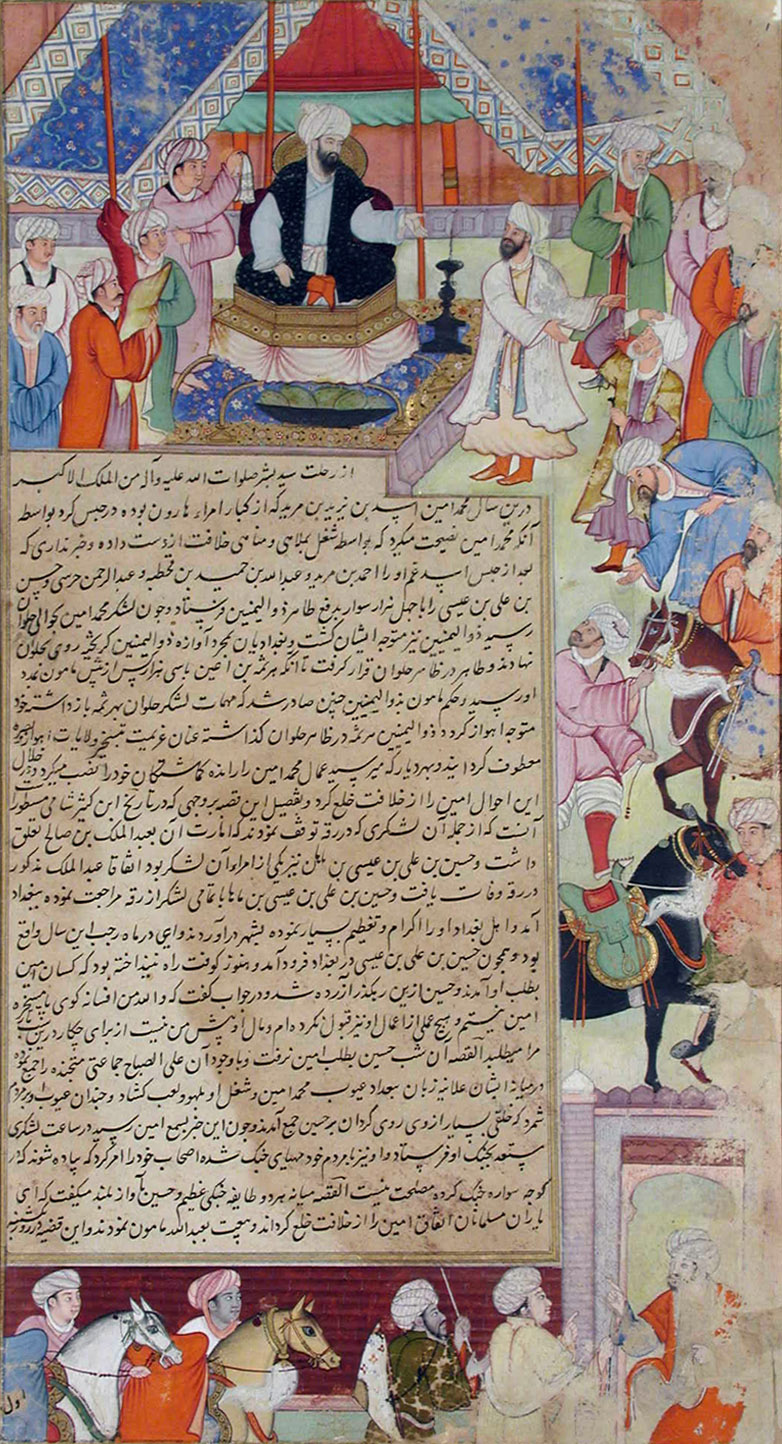
The populace pays allegiance to the new Abbasid Caliph, al-Maʿmun, c. 1593

In 750 AD, the Abbasids overthrew the Umayyad Caliphate, becoming the ruling power in the Islamic world. In 762 AD, Abu Jaʿfar Abdallah ibn Muhammad al-Mansur, the second Abbasid Caliph, decided to move the capital of the empire to his newly built city of Baghdad in Iraq from Damascus, which was in Syria. Al-Mansur was very cognizant of the need to cultivate intellect and wanted to advance and magnify the status of the Islamic people and their culture. As a result, he established a library, the House of Wisdom, in Baghdad where scholars and students could study new material, formulate new ideas, transcribe literature of their own, and translate various works from around the world into the Arabic language. Al-Mansur's descendants were also active in the cultivation of intellect, especially in the area of translation. Under the rule of Abu al-Abbas Abdallah ibn Harun al-Rashid (better known as al-Maʿmun) the House of Wisdom thrived, acquiring a large amount of support and recognition. Al-Maʿmun would send scholars all over the civilized world to retrieve scientific and literary works to be translated. The head translator at the time, Hunayn ibn Ishaq al-Ibadi, who was a Christian Arab of al-Hira, is believed to have translated over one hundred books, including the work On Anatomy of the Veins and Arteries by Galen. Due to the translation movement under al-Maʿmun, the House of Wisdom was one of the largest repositories of scientific and literary books in the world at the time and remained that way until the Siege of Baghdad in 1258 AD. The destruction and pillaging of Baghdad by the Mongols also included the destruction of the House of Wisdom, however, the books and other works inside were taken to Maragha by Hulagu Khan and Nasir al-Din al-Tusi.

=== Notable translators ===
Abu Zaid Hunayn ibn Ishaq al-Ibadi

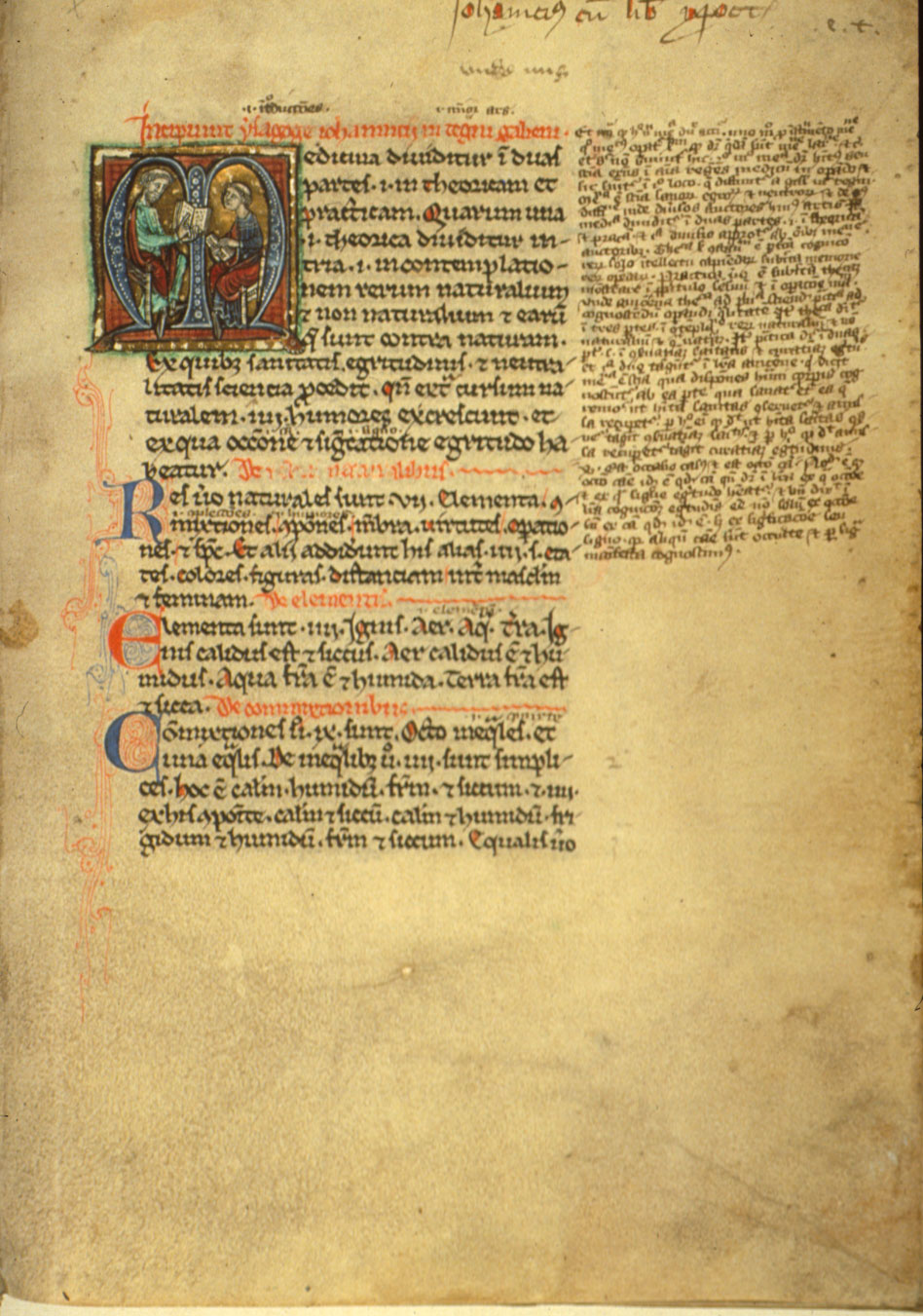
Hunayn's Introduction to the Art of Galen, Oxford, 13th century

Abu Zaid Hunayn ibn Ishaq al-Ibadi was a profound Arab physician, philosopher, author and leading translator in the House of Wisdom . He was born at Hira (Iraq) in 809 AD and spent most of his youth in Basra where he learned Arabic and Syriac. He was affiliated with the Syrian Nestorian Christian Church, and was brought up as a Nestorian Christian long before the rise of Islam. Hunayn was eager to continue his education, so he followed his father's footsteps and moved to Baghdad to study medicine. Hunayn was an important figure in the evolution of Arabic Medicine and was best known for his translations of famous Greek and Middle Eastern authors. He had a complete mastery of Greek, which was the science language of the time. Hunayn's knowledge of Persian, Syriac, and Arabic exceeded that of previous prevalent translators, which enabled him to revise their erroneous renditions. Galen, Hippocrates, Plato, Aristotle, Dioscorides, and Ptolemy were just a few of many writers that Hunayn used for his translated publications of medical and philosophical expositions. These translated treatises, in turn, became the backbone of Arabic Science.

As he began his path into medicine in Baghdad, he had the privilege to study under one of the most renowned physicians in the city, Yūhannā ibn Māssawayh. Yūhannā and his colleagues dedicated their lives to the field of medicine. They showed little to no respect to the people of Hira where Hunayn was from because Hira was known to be a city flourished by commerce and banking rather than science and medicine. Due to this, he did not take Hunayn seriously as a student. Hunayn was a highly intelligent person who paid very close attention to detail and found many mistakes in his assigned medical textbooks, so would often ask difficult questions no one at his school had the answer to. Eventually, Yūhannā became so frustrated that he gave up his rights as his teacher and blatantly told Hunayn that he did not have the ability to pursue this career.

Hunayn had a strong mindset and refused to let Yūhannā get in his way. He left Baghdad for several years, and during his absence he studied the history and language of Greek. When he returned, he displayed his newly acquired skills by being able to recite and translate the works of Homer and Galen. He began translating a large number of Galen's texts including "Anatomy of the Veins and Arteries", "Anatomy of the Muscles", "Anatomy of the Nerves", "On Sect", and many more in the upcoming future.

Everyone was astonished at his amazing talent especially Yūhannā, so the two reconciled and would later collaborate on several occasions. Hunayn, his son Ishaq, his nephew Hubaysh, and fellow colleague Isa ibn Uahya became very involved in translating medicinal and science texts. This led to the beginning of Hunayn's success into the translation movement, where he interpreted the works of famous Greek and Arabic figures: Plato, Aristotle, Hippocrates, Galen, and Dioscorides. He was also constantly fixing defective manuscripts translated by other writers. Hunayn would collect different books based around the subject he was translating, and strove to make the text as clear as possible for readers. Because his translation methods were impeccable, it was not long until Hunayn became famous. Unlike other translators during the Abbasid period, he did not translate texts word for word. Hunayn had a specific way of absorbing information by attempting to attain the meaning of the subject prior to rewriting it, which was very rare to witness during his time. After he grasped a proficient understanding of the piece, he would rephrase his knowledge of it in either the Syriac or Arabic language onto a new manuscript.

Hunayn, his son Ishaq Ibn Hunayn, his nephew Hubaysh Ibn al-Hasan al-Aʿsam, and fellow colleague Isa Ibn Uahya became very involved in working together on translating medicinal, science, and philosophical texts. Ishaq and Hunayn were important contributors in Hunayn's translations and active members of his school. His son mastered the Greek, Arabic, and Syriac language to be able to follow into father's footsteps. At the beginning of his career, Hunayn was very critical of his son's work, and even corrected his Arabic translations of "On the Number of Syllogisms". However, Ishaq was more interested in philosophy and would go on to translate several famous philosophical writings such as That the Prime Mover is Immobile and pieces of Galen's On Demonstration. He continued his passion for translations even after his father's death in 873 AD.

== Ramifications of the Translation Movement ==
=== Lack of original Greek texts ===
From the middle of the eighth century to the end of the tenth century, a very large amount of non-literary and non-historical secular Greek books were translated into Arabic. These included books that were accessible throughout the Eastern Byzantine Empire and the near east, according to the documentation from a century and a half of Graeco-Arabic scholarship. The Greek writings from Hellenistic, Roman, and late antiquity times that did not survive in the original Greek text were all vulnerable to the translator and the powers they had over them when completing the translation. It was not uncommon to come across Arabic translators who added their own thoughts and ideas into the translations. Ninth century Arab Muslim philosopher al-Kindi, for example, viewed Greek texts as a resource from which he was able to employ new ideas and methods. Al-Kindi used the Greek texts as outlines used to fix the weaknesses and finish what they left unfinished. Translating also meant new information could be added in, while some could potentially be taken out depending on what the translator's goal was. Another example of this is found in the Arabic translator's approach to Ptolemy's astronomy in the Almagest. The Almagest was critiqued and modified by Arabic astronomers for many generations. The modifications were made based on Greek thought, most coming from Aristotle. As a result, this led to many new developments. When discussing the development of Arabic science, Greek heritage is an important area to cover. At the same time, in order to receive a complete understanding of Greek science there are parts that have only survived in Arabic that must also be taken into account. For example, Apollonius' Conics books V to VII and Diophantus' Arithmetica books IV to VII. The two listed are items of Greek origin that have only survived in their Arabic translation. The circumstance is the same for the relationship between Latin and Greek science, which requires the analysis of Greek texts translated into Arabic and then into Latin. Translation entails viewpoints from one angle, the angle of the one performing the translation. The full analysis and journey of the translated pieces are key components in the overarching theme behind the piece.

== See also ==
- Hellenizing School, an analogue with Armenians
- Islamic Golden Age
- Science in the medieval Islamic world
- Translation
