= Bani Bahr =

Arabic tribe

Bani Bahr, or Bani Baher means (Bahr or Baher) family or tribe.

Bani Bahr, or Bani Baher (بني بحر ), are one of the Arabic tribes that lived at the borders of Syria and Iraq, close to existing city (Maya-den) and one of Banu Lakhm descendants. They live in Kuwait, Iraq, Syria, and Saudi Arabia. The wife of the former Amer of Kuwait was from Bahr family. One of the richest persons of Kuwait was Abdul Rahman Bahr. There are many Bahr families live in Aleppo, Syria.
