= Ibad =

Former Christian Arab group in Iraq

The ʿIbād or ʿEbād (Arabic: عِباد) were a Christian Arab group within the city of al-Ḥīra (Ḥirtā) during Late Antiquity and the early Middle Ages, when the city was part of the Sasanian Empire and later the Caliphate. Of diverse tribal backgrounds, the ʿIbād were united only by their adherence to Christianity and, after the sixth century, the Church of the East.

== Sources ==
Written sources of ʿIbādī history are found in Arabic, Syriac and Greek.

The most extensive sources on the ʿIbād are in Arabic. These tend to focus on kings and poets, and are also concerned with tribal genealogies. From the Abbasid period, they also tend to idealize the pre-Islamic past, the jāhiliyya. An important authority on the ʿIbād in the Arabic tradition is Ḥishām ibn al-Kalbī (d. 819), who consulted ʿIbādī books and archives in al-Ḥīra. He thus passes on something of the ʿIbād's own perception of themselves, their history and their city. His monograph about the ʿIbād is titled The Churches and Monasteries of al-Ḥīra and the Genealogies of the ʿIbādīs. Both al-Ṭabarī and Abuʾl-Faraj use it as their main source on al-Ḥīra.

Oral tradition also informed Arabic historiography. In the twelfth century, Abuʾl-Baqāʾ of al-Ḥilla wrote that the history of the Lakhmid dynasty that had ruled the region before Islam was taught to schoolchildren.

Syriac sources are all ecclesiastical. Their concerns and tendencies are completely different from those of the Arab Islamic historiography. They are concerned only with saints, holy men and clerics and often exaggerate their sufferings.

The archaeology of the region of al-Ḥīra and the study of the architecture of the Church of the East are underexplored and underdeveloped. Although both Arabic and Syriac sources name many churches and monasteries associated with the ʿIbād, none has yet been identified with any existing ruins.

== Name and tribal affiliation ==
The Arabic term ʿibād means "servants" or "devotees". It is a plural form of ʿabd, which could mean a servant (i.e., of God) or slave. In the Qurʾān, it is equivalent to the plural form ʿabīd, although later usage would reserve it for servants of God and ʿabīd for slaves.

ʿIbād is probably a contraction of the phrase ʿibād al-Rabb ("slaves of the Lord"), ʿibād al-Masīḥ ("servants of the Messiah") or ʿibād Allāḥ ("servants of God"), an expression reflecting a sense of being the only genuine worshipers of God. It seems to have been the self-designation of the Christians of al-Ḥīra. Although in later Islamic literature the term usually referred to the Christians of al-Ḥīra exclusively, it may sometimes have been used as a synonym for Christians generally, as in the phrase al-ʿIbādiyyūn min Tamīm ("the Christians of Tamīm") found in the Kitāb al-Aghānī of Abuʾl-Faraj, or for Christians of the Church of the East, as when Ibn ʿAsākir (d. 1175) distinguishes between the erstwhile "Jacobite" churches and the "churches of the ʿIbād" in Damascus.

The ʿIbād had diverse tribal backgrounds from both northern Arabia (Tamīm, Rabīʿa and Muḍar) and southern (Azd, Iyād and Lakhm). There were ʿIbād who could trace their genealogy to the Banū ʿAlqama, Banū Ayyūb, Banū Buqayla (Azd), Banū Kaʿb, Banū ʿUqayl and even the Banū Marīna, the same branch as the Lakhmid royal family. There were prominent Christians of the Ṭayyiʾ in al-Ḥīra, but it is not clear if they were considered ʿIbād. ʿĀqūlāyē, the Syriac name for the ʿIbād, is derived from the prominent tribe of the Banū ʿUqayl. When Christianity began to spread out from al-Ḥīra into Babylonia, one early Christian settlement was named ʿAqūla after the tribe. Because the ʿIbād were a unity formed out of several tribes, al-Jawharī says, they received their own nisba, a surname usually indicating tribal affiliation: al-ʿIbādī.

Generally, the term ʿIbād seems only to have referred to the established sedentary Christian population of mixed tribal background in al-Ḥīra. The Christians of the nearby semi-nomadic Bedouin tribes were not usually called ʿIbād, nor were Christian newcomers to al-Ḥīra. Abuʾl-Baqāʾ says explicitly that the ʿIbād were "the noble people of al-Ḥīra, the people of the good families" (buyūtāt).

== Language and culture ==
The ʿIbād were of considerable antiquity, part of a wider Christian community in southern Mesopotamia and the Sasanian Empire that developed independently of trends within the Roman Empire.

The first language of the ʿIbād was Arabic, but their dress and manners were that of the Aramaic-speaking peasantry of the Sawād (the fertile land of southern Mesopotamia). Later Islamic traditions records that the Arab conquerors of Mesopotamia had some difficulty accepting the ʿIbād as fellow Arabs. One legend has an ʿIbādī referring to his people as both "true Arabs and Arabized Arabs" (ʿarab ʿāriba wa-ʿarab mutaʿarriba), i.e., a mix of southern Qahtanite and northern Adnanites. Another records the legendary ʿIbādī ʿAbd al-Masīḥ ibn Buqayla saying, "we are Nabateanized Arabs and Arabized Nabateans" (ʿarabun stanbaṭnā wa-nabaṭun staʿrabnā). The traditions show that the ʿIbād were accepted as Arabs by other Arabs, largely because their first language was Arabic.

Archaeological excavations suggest that the church architecture of the ʿIbād belonged to the traditions of Mesopotamian architecture and Sasanian architecture with little influence from eastern Roman architecture. This style of church architecture is found throughout Babylonia and the Persian Gulf.

It has been argued that the ʿIbād developed the original Kufic script in pre-Islamic times. Early Islamic tradition, as in the Kitāb al-Aghānī, traces the script back to al-Ḥīra.

== History ==
According to Syriac tradition, Christianity was brought to the region of al-Ḥīra by a hermit named ʿAbdīshoʿ in the third century. He is said to have founded the first monastery of al-Ḥīra, probably as a hermitage. By the end of the third century, the encampment of al-Ḥīra had become the capital of the Lakhmids, who turned it into an important trading centre. By the fifth century the dominant group there was the Christians, who called themselves ʿIbād. Abuʾl-Baqāʾ, writing in the twelfth century, says that the ʿIbād "formed the majority" in al-Ḥīra. They had arrived in a series of migrations from eastern Arabia and al-Yamāma in central Arabia.

A bishop of al-Ḥīra, named Hosea, is first attested in the acts of the Council of Seleucia-Ctesiphon in 410. The see was a suffragan of the patriarchal province. In the Council of 484, the Church of the East adopted dyophysitism (Nestorianism), but the doctrine prevailing at al-Ḥīra is uncertain. Monophysite (Jacobite) missionaries were active among the Arab tribes around the city. In the early sixth century, Aḥudemmeh converted the Tanūkh and the Arabs of Kūfa and Simeon of Bēt Arshām was actively proselytizing in al-Ḥīra itself. The Taghlib were also converted to monophysitism and the pagans of the oasis of ʿAyn al-Namir even to Phantasiasm.

The ʿIbād appear to have been doctrinally mixed prior to the late sixth century, when dyophysite influence overwhelmed the monophysite. The closure of the dyophysite School of Nisibis in 540 was a major catalyst, since it was refounded by some former students in al-Ḥīra. Around the same time there seems to have been an exodus of monophysites from al-Ḥīra to Najrān.

During the reign of Khosrow I (531–579) and Bishop Ephrāem, the monastery of Dayr al-Hind al-Kubrā was founded in al-Ḥīra. It is the only monastery the foundation inscription of which has been preserved. It was copied by Ḥishām ibn al-Kalbī. It records that the church was founded by Hind bint al-Ḥārith, wife of the Lakhmid king al-Mundhir III ibn al-Nuʿman (503–554) and mother of King ʿAmr III ibn al-Mundhir (554–570).

Around 592, the Lakhmid king al-Nuʿmān III converted to Nestorianism. According to a legend repeated by Abuʾl-Baqāʾ, the king fell ill and requested the help of both the Yaʿqūbiyya (Jacobites) and the Nasṭūriyyūn (Nestorians). The prayers of the Jacobites failed to heal the king, and the Nestorians demanded that he convert to their faith. This was done in a public ceremony, but nonetheless the archbishop of Mosul and Erbil had to be fetched to perform an exorcism. This story probably represents part of the origin legend of the ʿIbād of Abuʾl-Baqāʾ's day, explaining how the confessional diversity in the city was replaced by uniformity. According to al-Masʿūdī, writing in the tenth century, the ʿIbād were all Nestorians, which meant members of the Church of the East.

In 636, during the Muslim conquest of Persia, the church of al-Ḥīra was razed so Saʿd ibn Abī Waqqāṣ could build his capital of Kūfa. In later Islamic writings, al-Ḥīra became a symbol of the transience of worldly accomplishments. It was a common setting for the orgies and bacchanalia in the khamriyyāt (wine poetry) of the "accursed poets" (shuʿarāʾ al-mujūn) of Kūfa, since the monasteries of al-Ḥīra were associated with drinking and taverns. According to al-Shābushtī, the daughter of al-Nuʿmān III, Hind bint an-Nuʿmān, who had retired to a monastery, met Saʿd ibn Abī Waqqāṣ and Mughīra ibn Shuʿba al-Thaqafī around the time of the conquest and told them how:

In the evening, there was no Arab on earth that did not request favors from us and glorify us, but then in the morning, there was no one from whom we did not request favors and glorify!

== Notable ʿIbādīs ==
- Aws ibn Qallām (reigned 363–368)
- ʿAdī ibn Zayd (6th century)
- Jābir ibn Shamʿūn (6th century)
- Shubhalishoʿ (fl. 780s)
- Ḥunayn ibn Isḥāq al-ʿIbādī (809–873)

== Bibliography ==
- Bosworth, C. Edmund (2012) [2003]. "Ḥira". Encyclopaedia Iranica. Vol. XII, Fasc. 3. pp. 322–323.
- Brockopp, Jonathan E. (2018). "Servants". Encyclopaedia of the Qur'ān Online. Brill. doi:10.1163/1875-3922_q3_EQSIM_00380.
- Hainthaler, Theresia (2005). "ʿAdī ibn Zayd al-ʿIbādī, the Pre-Islamic Christian Poet of al-Ḥīrā and His Poem Nr. 3 Written in Jail". Parole de l'Orient. 30: 157–172.
- Hainthaler, Theresia (2007). Christliche Araber vor dem Islam: Verbreitung und konfessionelle Zugehörigkeit: eine Hinführung. Leuven: Peeters.
- Takahashi, Hidemi (2011a). "Damascus". In S. P. Brock; A. M. Butts; G. A. Kiraz; L. Van Rompay (eds.). Gorgias Encyclopedic Dictionary of the Syriac Heritage: Electronic Edition. Gorgias Press.
- Takahashi, Hidemi (2011b). "Ḥirta (al-Ḥīra)". In S. P. Brock; A. M. Butts; G. A. Kiraz; L. Van Rompay (eds.). Gorgias Encyclopedic Dictionary of the Syriac Heritage: Electronic Edition. Gorgias Press.
- Toral-Niehoff, Isabel (2010). "The ʿIbād of al-Ḥīra: An Arab Christian Community in Late Antique Iraq". In Angelika Neuwirth; Michael Marx; Nicolai Sinai (eds.). The Qurʾān in Context: Entangled Histories and Textual Palimpsests. Leiden: Brill. pp. 323–347 (1–25 in the PDF).
- Trimingham, J. Spencer (1979). Christianity Among the Arabs in Pre-Islamic Times. London: Longman.
- Wilmshurst, David (2011). The Martyred Church: A History of the Church of the East. East and West Publishing.
- Wood, Philip (2016). "Al-Ḥīra and Its Histories". Journal of the American Oriental Society. 136 (4): 785–799.
