= Shammar Yahri'sh =

Shammar Yahr'ish al-Himyari
- King of Saba', Dhu Raydan, Hadramawt and Yamnat
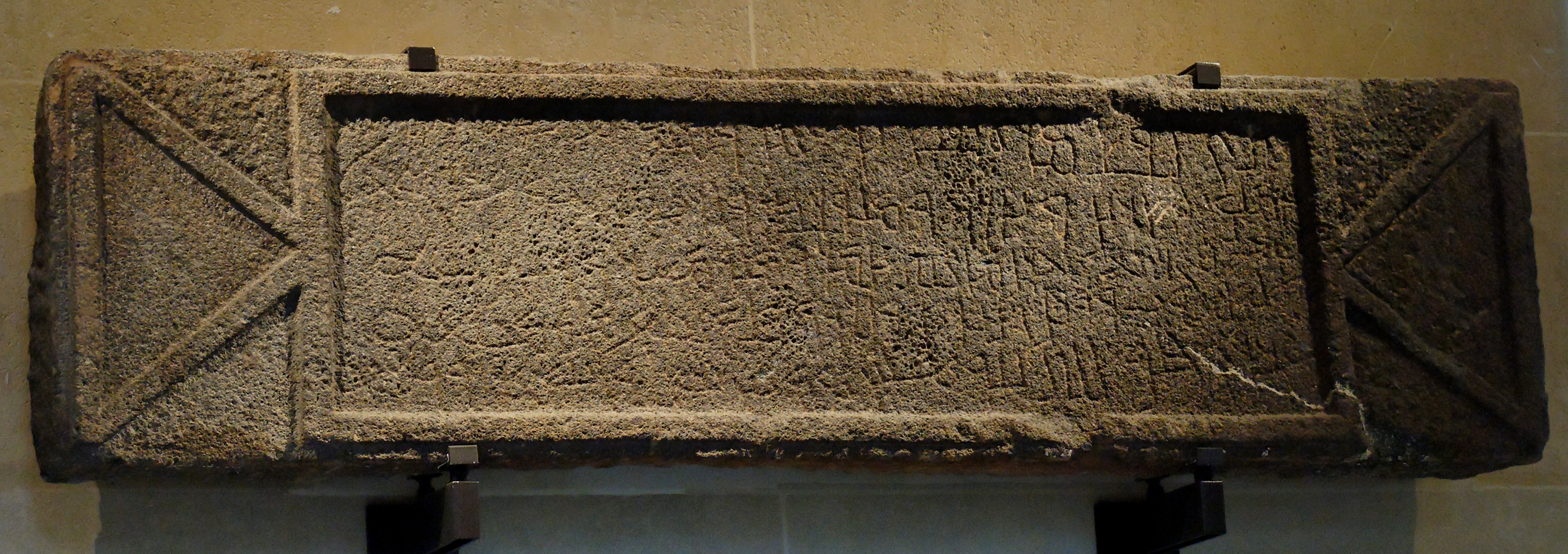
- The Namara inscription which has Shammar's name inscribed on it
- Reign: 275–312 CE
- Predecessor: Yasir Yuha'nim
- Successor: Yasir Yuha'nim
- Died: c. 312; Yemen
Names
- Shammar Yahr'ish ibn Yasser Yuha'nim
- Father: Yasir Yuha'nim
- Religion: South Arabian polytheism

Shammar Yahr'ish al-Himyari, full name Shammar Yahr'ish ibn Yasir Yuha'nim (Himyaritic: 𐩦𐩣𐩧 𐩺𐩠𐩲𐩧𐩦 𐩨𐩬 𐩺𐩪𐩧 𐩺𐩠𐩬𐩲𐩣, romanized: Šammar Yuharʿiš bin Yāsir Yuhanʿim) was a Himyarite king. He was the first to have the title “King of Saba', Dhu Raydan, Hadramawt and Yamnat” and he united most of Yemen during his rule.

== Biography ==
Not much is known about the life of Shammar Yahr'ish. He was from the tribe of Himyar. In the year 275 CE, Shammar Yahr'ish was first mentioned in inscriptions. In the same year, he conquered the cities of Najran and Ma'rib. By 280 CE, he had united most of Yemen under his rule. Later in 296 CE, he assumed the title King of Saba', Dhu Raydan, Hadramawt and Yamnat. Subsequent rulers would hold the same titles until the reign of Malikikarib Yuhamin. He strove for diplomatic relations with contemporary kingdoms such as the Roman Empire, the Sasanian Empire and the ruling Arab tribes of al-Azd and Tanukh. The Lakhmid ruler Imru al-Qays I ibn Amr claimed to have defeated Shammar Yahr'ish in 328 CE at the borders of Najran, and the victory over Shammar is mentioned on Imru al-Qays' stone epitaph. The last inscription of Shammar Yahr'ish is dated to 312 CE.

== Diplomacy ==
In 309 CE, Shammar Yahr'ish sent a diplomatic delegation to the cities of Ctesiphon and Seleucia, two cities which were under the control of the Sasanian ruler Bahram II. Another delegation also reached the kingdom of Imru al-Qays I ibn Amr in the land of al-Hirah. The king of the Kindites, Malik ibn Muawiyah, also pledged allegiance to Shammar Yahr'ish. In 311 AD, another diplomatic delegation was sent to the Roman Empire.

== In Arabian folklore ==
Shammar Yahr'ish is glorified in the Arabian folklore regarding him. He is believed to have conquered the Levant region and even reached as far as the Northeastern Asian territories. The name of the city of Samarkand in Uzbekistan is said to have been formed by a composite of two words: Shammar-Kand, which means "Shammar Destroyed" (after he supposedly conquered it). Later scholars have debunked all these stories, citing them as mere mythology.

== See also ==
- Shammar tribe
- Himyarite Kingdom
- List of rulers of Saba' and Himyar
