= Aws ibn Qallam =

Fourth king of al-Hirah, reigning between the years 363-368

- King of the Lakhmid state
- Reign: CE 363–368
- Predecessor: Amr II ibn Imru al-Qays
- Successor: Imru al-Qays II ibn Amr
- Died: 374
- House: Lakhmids
- Father: Amr ibn Imru al-Qays
- Religion: Nestorian Christian

Aws ibn Qallam ibn Batina ibn Jumayhir al-Lihyani (Arabic: أوس بن قلام بن بطينة بن جميهر اللحياني) was the fourth king of al-Hirah, he reigned in 363–368, interrupting the succession of the city's Lakhmid rulers.

He was the scion of a noble Christian Arab family. One of his relatives built a church, and one of his descendants was Jabir ibn Sham'on, the bishop of al-Hira. Aws was the one who brought the family of Uday ibn Zayd to al-Hira. Aws was killed by the Lakhmid nobleman Juhjuban ibn Atik al-Lakhmi during the latter's revolt.
