= Al-Mundhir I ibn al-Nu'man =

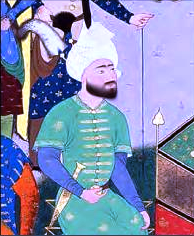
- Portrayal of al-Mundhir in the Shahnameh of Shah Tahmasp.

King of the Lakhmids
- Reign: 418–461
- Predecessor: Al-Nu'man I
- Successor: Al-Aswad ibn al-Mundhir
- Born: c. 418
- Died: c. 462 (age 44)
- Issue: al-Aswad ibn al-Mundhir
- House: Lakhmids
- Father: al-Numan I
- Mother: Hind bint Zayd

Al-Mundhir ibn al-Nuʿmān (Arabic: المنذر بن النعمان) was the seventh Lakhmid king (418–461). His mother's name was Hind bint Zayd-Manāt ibn Zayd-Allah al-Ghassani, and his father was al-Nu'man I.

== Biography ==
Yazdegerd I, who had strong relations with his father sent Mundhir his infant son Bahram Gur to be raised and educated in his court. After Yazdegerd's death, Persian nobles tried to reclaim Bahram from Mundhir, so Mundhir sent his son Nu'man with a brigade then he personally escorted Bahram another brigade of 10,000 soldiers to Ctesiphon where the nobles, after some negotiations, acknowledged Bahram as their ruler. Later the Byzantines were upset at the persecution of Christians in the Persian lands where Bahram killed a number of them and Mundhir in turn was for the persecution and converted back to his paganism, the Byzantines besieged Nisibis so Bahram along with Mundhir went to lift the siege. Later Mundhir marched towards Byzantine lands and ravaged the lands as far as Antioch, where he was routed by Vitianus. Another unfortunate campaign was carried out by Mundhir a year later. While his troops were crossing the Euphrates, many of his forces drowned. Syriac sources give a figure of those who drowned at 70,000 while Socrates give a higher figure of 100,000. The war between Persia and the Byzantines came to end with a peace treaty in 422. In 457 Lakhmid troops attacked "Beth Hur" near Harran in the Roman domain, taking the inhabitants into captivity.

Mundhir was succeeded by his son al-Aswad ibn al-Mundhir (r. 462–490).

== Sources ==
- Bosworth, C. E., ed. (1999). The History of al-Ṭabarī, Volume V: The Sāsānids, the Byzantines, the Lakhmids, and Yemen. SUNY Series in Near Eastern Studies. Albany, New York: State University of New York Press. ISBN 978-0-7914-4355-2.
