= Tanukh =

Ancient and medieval Arab tribal confederation in Fertile Crescent

Tanukh تنوخ
- Confederation
- Tanukhid sphere of influence in the 4th-century
- Ethnicity: Arab
- Nisba: Tanūkhī
- Location: Eastern Arabia (2nd century CE); Mesopotamia (3rd–9th centuries); Northern Syria (4th–11th centuries); Southern Mount Lebanon (11th–17th centuries)
- Confederation: Foederati of the Byzantine Empire
- Language: Old Arabic; Greek (Byzantine era)
- Religion: Orthodox Christianity (4th–8th centuries); Islam (8th–11th centuries); Druze (11th–17th centuries)

The Tanukh (Arabic: تنوخ, romanized: Tanūkh, sometimes referred to as the Tanukhids (التنوخيون, al-Tanūkhiyyūn), was an Arab tribal group whose history in the Arabian Peninsula and the Fertile Crescent spanned the 2nd century CE to the 17th century. The group began as a confederation of Arab tribes in eastern Arabia in the 2nd century and migrated to Mesopotamia during Parthian rule in the 3rd century. The confederation was led around this time by its king Jadhima, whose rule is attested by a Greek–Nabatean inscription and who plays an epic role in the traditional narratives of the pre-Islamic period. At least part of the Tanukh migrated to Byzantine Syria in the 4th century, where they served as the first Arab foederati (tribal confederates) of the empire. Shortly after, Aleppo served as the main base and political centre during the rule of their warrior-queen, Queen Mavia. The Tanukh's premier place among the foederati was lost after its rebellion in the 380s, but it remained a zealous Orthodox Christian ally of the Byzantines until the Muslim conquest of Syria in the 630s.

Under early Muslim rule, the tribe largely retained its Christian faith and settlements around Qinnasrin and Aleppo. The Tanukh was an ally of the Syria-based Umayyad Caliphate and became part of the Umayyads' main tribal support base, the Quda'a confederation. During the 8th and 9th centuries, their main centre shifted to Qinnasrin and Maarat al-Numan. The Tanukh's fortunes, like that of Syria in general, declined under the Iraq-based Abbasid Caliphate, which forced its tribesmen to convert to Islam in 780. As a result of attacks during the Fourth Muslim Civil War in the early 9th century, the Tanukh's area of settlement shifted to Ma'arrat al-Nu'man and the coastal mountains between Latakia and Homs, which by the 10th century were called 'Jabal Tanukh'.

Tanukhid tribesmen later settled in the Gharb area outside Beirut in Mount Lebanon and in the 11th century, they became one of the leading tribal groups to embrace the emergent Druze faith. A Tanukhid family of the Gharb, the Buhturids (commonly called 'Tanukh' after their parent tribe), held the area almost perpetually throughout Crusader, Ayyubid and Mamluk rule and produced one of the major religious thinkers of the Druze, the 15th-century al-Sayyid al-Tanukhi. Their influence gave way to an allied Druze clan in Mount Lebanon, the Ma'ns of the Chouf, but they continued to locally dominate the Gharb well into the Ottoman era in the 16th and 17th centuries. The Buhturids were eliminated by a rival Druze family in the 1630s.

== Origins in eastern Arabia ==
The early Arabic tradition, particularly the works of the Kufan historian Ibn al-Kalbi (d. 819), claim that the Tanukh was a confederation of migrant Arab tribes formed in Bahrayn (eastern Arabia). The traditional narratives describe the constituent tribes' migration from the Tihamah (the western Arabian coastlands of Mecca to Yemen (southern Arabia)) to Bahrayn. While modern historians question or dismiss the historicity of the migration from Tihamah, there is general acceptance that the Tanukh was forged or present in Bahrayn by the 2nd century CE. (Note: The historian Jan Retso considers the "historicty" of the Tihamah emigration "highly suspect", while Irfan Shahid considers the details "difficult to accept without the availability of epigraphic and non-Arabic sources".) Ptolemy refers to the Tanukh in eastern Arabia in his Geography, dated c. 150, but they are not mentioned living in the region in Pliny's earlier Natural History, dated 77 CE, confirming its 2nd-century formation there.

== Euphrates valley and al-Hira ==
From Bahrayn, the Tanukh migrated to central Iraq (the middle Euphrates river valley), perhaps during Parthian rule, i.e. before 220 CE. Their presence in Iraq is supported by a late 3rd-century Sabian inscription mentioning the Himyarite king Shammar Yuharish's dispatch of ambassadors to the capitals of the Sasanian Empire (which succeeded Parthia) and the "land of Tanukh". They may have been assaulted by the Sasanian king Shapur I (r. 240–270) during his capture of Hatra in c. 240. Sometime afterward, Jadhima al-Abrash became king of the Tanukh. Jadhima is an obscure figure who plays an epic role as the folk hero-king of the Tanukh in the traditional narrative, but his existence is attested by a 3rd-century Greek and Nabatean inscription found in Umm al-Jimal (in modern northern Jordan), which mentions "Jadhima" as the "king of Tanukh". According to Retso, Jadhima's influence must have at least spanned the middle Euphrates and possibly the Syrian Desert.

== Syria ==
=== Byzantine period ===
At least a segment of the Tanukh left Mesopotamia sometime after the Sasanian victory at Hatra in the mid-3rd century and established itself in Byzantine Syria. By the 4th century, they became the first Arab tribal group to serve as foederati (confederates) of the Byzantines. The Arabic tradition names Jadhima's nephew as Amr ibn Adi of the Lakhm tribe, which dwelt in southern Syria at that time. It is likely he is the same as the "Amr, king of the Lakhm" mentioned in a Parthian inscription as a vassal of the Sasanian emperor Narseh (r. 293–302). Moreover, Amr's son was likely the "Imru al-Qays, son of Amr, king of the Arabs", whose Arabic epitaph (the Namara inscription in Syria) dates his death to 328 CE. As blood relatives of Imru al-Qays through Jadhima, the Tanukh in Syria may have been affiliated with him.

Shahid suggests that the Tanukh was the tribe of the Arab tribal queen Mavia, whose tribal identity is not known. Mavia went to war with Emperor Valens during the 370s. By then, the Tanukh were ardent Orthodox Christians and Mavia's war with Valens, who embraced Arian theology, was influenced by their doctrinal differences. The Tanukh revolted against the Byzantines in c. 380, during the reign of Emperor Theodosius I, and their rebellion was suppressed by the magister militum Richomer. This marked the end of their role as the principal Arab federates of the Byzantines in Syria, which was held by the Salihids by the 5th century. Little is known of the Tanukh for the remainder of Byzantine rule, but according to Shahid, they remained Christian federates of the empire.

=== Early Islamic period ===
Map of Islamic Syria, showing the jund (district) of Qinnasrin, where the Tanukh had been established from the Byzantine period and remained throughout early Islamic rule (7th–11th centuries)

==== Muslim conquest ====
During the Muslim conquest of Syria in the 630s, the Tanukh fought on the Byzantine side. The tribe participated in the battle of Dumat al-Jandal in 634 against the Muslim Arab forces of Khalid ibn al-Walid and in the failed Byzantine counteroffensive against Muslim forces at Homs in 637. They submitted to the Muslim commander Abu Ubayda ibn al-Jarrah when the latter approached their hadir (encampments) at Qinnasrin and Aleppo in 638. Part of the tribe retreated with Byzantine forces into Anatolia and part remained in northern Syria.

==== Umayyad period ====
Although some Tanukhids probably embraced Islam at this stage, the majority of the Tanukh remained Christian throughout Umayyad rule over the Caliphate (661–750). They had fought in the ranks of the first Umayyad caliph Mu'awiya I when he was governor of Syria (639–661) against the forces of Caliph Ali (r. 656–661) at the Battle of Siffin in 657. When Umayyad rule had collapsed across the Caliphate, including in most of Syria's junds (military districts), the Tanukh was one of the Syrian tribes to fight for the Umayyad caliph Marwan I (r. 684–685) at the Battle of Marj Rahit in 684. There, the pro-Umayyad camp engaged the Syrian supporters of the anti-Umayyad caliph Ibn al-Zubayr, whose core consisted of the Qays tribes of Jund Qinnasrin (the military district of Qinnasrin). The pro-Zubayrid Qays was routed and the Tanukh was purportedly lauded in verse by Marwan, comparing them to "a difficult and lofty peak".

According to the historian Werner Caskel, it was after Marj Rahit that the Tanukh was enlisted into the Quda'a confederation. From the time of Mu'awiya's governorship, the Quda'a, led by the Banu Kalb tribe, had been the military mainstay of the Umayyad state and held a privileged place in government over the other Syrian tribal groups. The Qays, which was established in northern Syria and Upper Mesopotamia, where they had migrated during Mu'awiya's administration, launched a series of damaging raids against the Kalb in revenge for their losses at Marj Rahit over the next few years. This spurred the Kalb to buttress the Quda'a, with special attention given to the Tanukh, as its tribesmen dwelt in the same north Syrian region as the Qays. The Tanukh, a comparably smaller or weaker tribe, was mutually motivated to join the Quda'a, as were the Christian Salihids of northern Syria. Caskel suggests that the general narrative in the early Islamic tradition of the Quda'a being a constituent tribe of the Tanukh from its time in Bahrayn was fabricated by the Arab genealogists of Kufa and the Tanukhids of neighboring al-Hirah within the following decade to justify the Tanukh's union with the Quda'a. It was during this period that the Quda'a allied with the South Arabian Qahtan confederation in Syria to form the anti-Qaysi Yaman faction.

The Tanukh attacked the Qaysi-dominated army of the Umayyad caliph Marwan II (r. 744–750) when it passed through Qinnasrin and Khunasira in 744. The Umayyads were tolerant of the Christians of Syria, including Christian Arab tribes, as the Syrians were the foundation of their power. With the fall of the Umayyad dynasty in 750 to the Iraq-based Abbasids, the Tanukh lost its patron and its fortunes declined.

==== Abbasid period ====
In 780, the Abbasid caliph al-Mahdi sojourned to northern Syria and was received by a 5,000-strong party of the Tanukh led by their chief Layth ibn al-Mahatta. Upon being informed of their Christianity, al-Mahdi ordered them to embrace Islam and had Layth decapitated when he refused. The incident demoralized the tribe, the remainder or majority of which converted to Islam, and the Tanukh's churches were destroyed. Shahid speculates al-Mahdi's forcible conversion of the Tanukhids, in contravention of prevailing Islamic law allowing Christians to live as dhimmis ('protected peoples' subject to the poll tax) stemmed from the Tanukh's strong and prosperous showing, which greatly embarrassed the zealously Islamic caliph. Until that point, Shahid described the Tanukh as an "autonomous Christian community" in Syria.

During the Fourth Muslim Civil War (811–837), the Tanukh of Qinnasrin gave allegiance to the self-proclaimed caliph Abu al-Umaytir, an Umayyad who had ousted the Abbasid governor from Damascus in 811. The attempted Umayyad resurgence was suppressed by pro-Abbasid forces in 813. In the aftermath of the Abbasid counteroffensive in Syria, the Tanukhids dwelling in the outskirts of Aleppo led by al-Hawari ibn Hittan, who also controlled Ma'arrat al-Nu'man and Tell Mannas, rebelled against the Abbasid Banu Salih family, which controlled Aleppo city. Besieged, the Banu Salih enlisted the support of the neighboring Qaysi tribes, which had also been in rebellion against the Abbasids. The Qaysi rebels ousted the Tanukh from the Aleppo area. Al-Hawari was later pardoned by Caliph al-Ma'mun (r. 813–833).

==== Hamdanid and Mirdasid periods ====
As a result of the raids by the Qaysi rebels, Tanukhid settlement shifted from Aleppo and Qinnasrin southwestward to Ma'arrat al-Nu'man and the mountain range running east of Latakia toward Homs in the south. The settlement there of the Tanukh and the Bahra', another constituent tribe of the Quda'a, lent the range its medieval name Jabal Bahra' wa Tanukh, as it was referred to by the geographer Istakhri in the early 10th century. This was the geographic setting of the Tanukh when northern Syria became part of the autonomous Hamdanid emirate of Aleppo under Sayf al-Dawla in 944–945, which was succeeded by the Mirdasid emirate in 1024. According to the historian Thierry Bianquis, at that time the area of Maarat al-Nu'man was the "fief" of the Tanukhids, while the Bahra' and groups of Kurds inhabited the coastal mountains. Although they were largely concentrated in Ma'arrat al-Nu'man, the 10th-century geographer al-Hasan ibn Muhammad al-Muhallabi noted that the Tanukh (along with the Quraysh) were one of two chief descent groups of the Arabs living in Aleppo city at that time. The tribesmen of the Tanukh were "absorbed into urban life" but "nevertheless maintained their tribal organisation and traditions", according to the historian Suhayl Zakkar. The most notable member of the Tanukh during this period was the poet and philosopher al-Ma'arri. (Note: Other notable Tanukhids were the Aleppine historians al-Azimi and Yahya ibn Ali al-Tanukhi.)

== Emirate in Mount Lebanon ==
The final stage of the Tanukh's history was in Mount Lebanon, specifically the Gharb district lying southeast of Beirut, where the tribe "suddenly appeared", in Shahid's words. The tribes of the Gharb and nearby regions were the subject of missionary activity of the Druze, an offshoot of Isma'ili Shia Islam, in the 11th century. Three Tanukhid chiefs in the Gharb were specifically addressed in Epistle 50 of the Epistles of Wisdom, a compilation of 11th-century Druze scriptures. The Tanukh embraced the new Druze religion. In the 11th century, the Tanukhids of Mount Lebanon inaugurated the Druze community in Lebanon, when most of them accepted and adopted the new message, due to their leadership's close ties with then Fatimid caliph al-Hakim bi-Amr Allah.

A family of the Tanukh in the Gharb, the Buhturids (commonly referred to in the sources simply as the 'Tanukh'), became a local buffer force straddling the domains of the Muslim rulers of Damascus and the Crusader lords of Beirut in the 12th and 13th centuries. (Note: As the history of the Buhturids was first recorded in the 15th and 16th centuries by the local Druze chroniclers Salih ibn Yahya and Ibn Sibat, the historian Kais Firro questions whether the Buhturids' actual kinship to the Tanukh of southern Mount Lebanon, who are mentioned in 11th-century Druze scriptures, was an invention of these chroniclers.) They retained their emirate in the Gharb through Ayyubid rule (1188–1197), the Crusader restoration in Beirut (1197–1293) and Mamluk rule (1293–1516).

Under Mamluk rule, the Buhturids served as their own unit in the army, charged with protecting the harbor of Beirut from seaborne raids and assigned practically hereditary iqtas. While maintaining these military capacities, they grew their commercial enterprises in Beirut in the 15th century, exporting silk, olive oil and soap. In the 15th century, a member of the family, al-Sayyid al-Tanukhi from the Gharb village of Abeih, became a major reformer and theologian of the Druze faith. His teachings were foundational to modern Druze religious laws and everyday practices he remains the most revered figure among the Druze faithful after their 11th-century missionaries.

The Ottomans conquered the region in 1516 and after initial tensions, generally kept the Buhturids on as local tax farmers in the Gharb throughout the 16th century. By then, they had become politically overshadowed in the Druze Mountain (southern Mount Lebanon) by their allies, the Ma'n dynasty of the Chouf district. In 1633, after the fall of the Ma'nid strongman of the western Levant, Fakhr al-Din, whose mother was a Buhturid, the last Buhturids were massacred by a Druze rival, Ali Alam al-Din.

== Bibliography ==
- Ball, Warwick (2001). Rome in the East: The Transformation of an Empire. Routledge. ISBN 0-415-11376-8.
- Bianquis, Thierry (1997). "Sayf al-Dawla". In Bosworth, C. E.; van Donzel, E.; Heinrichs, W. P. & Lecomte, G. (eds.). The Encyclopaedia of Islam, Second Edition. Volume IX: San–Sze. Leiden: E. J. Brill. pp. 103–110. ISBN 978-90-04-10422-8.
- Caskel, Werner (1966). Ğamharat an-nasab: Das genealogische Werk des His̆ām ibn Muḥammad al-Kalbī, Volume II (in German). Leiden: Brill. OCLC 490272940.
- Cobb, Paul M. (2001). White Banners: Contention in 'Abbasid Syria, 750–880. SUNY Press. ISBN 978-0791448809.
- Crone, Patricia (1994). "Were the Qays and Yemen of the Umayyad Period Political Parties?". Der Islam. 71 (1). Walter de Gruyter and Co.: 1–57. doi:10.1515/islm.1994.71.1.1. ISSN 0021-1818.
- Firro, Kais (1992). A History of the Druzes. Vol. 1. Brill. ISBN 9004094377.
- Firro, K. (2000). "al-Tanūkhī, Djamāl al-Dīn ʿAbd Allāh". In Bearman, P. J.; Bianquis, Th.; Bosworth, C. E.; van Donzel, E. & Heinrichs, W. P. (eds.). The Encyclopaedia of Islam, Second Edition. Volume X: T–U. Leiden: E. J. Brill. p. 192. ISBN 978-90-04-11211-7.
- Harris, William (2012). Lebanon: A History, 600–2011. New York: Oxford University Press. ISBN 978-0-19-518-111-1.
- Hawting, G. R., ed. (1989). The History of al-Ṭabarī, Volume XX: The Collapse of Sufyānid Authority and the Coming of the Marwānids: The Caliphates of Muʿāwiyah II and Marwān I and the Beginning of the Caliphate of ʿAbd al-Malik, A.D. 683–685/A.H. 64–66. SUNY Series in Near Eastern Studies. Albany, New York: State University of New York Press. ISBN 978-0-88706-855-3.
- Hourani, Alexander (2010). New Documents on the History of Mount Lebanon and Arabistan in the 10th and 11th Centuries H. Beirut.
- Hoyland, Robert (2007). "Epigraphy and the Emergence of Arab Identity". In Sijpesteijn, Petra (ed.). From Al-Andalus to Khurasan: Documents from the Medieval Muslim World. Leiden: Brill. pp. 219–242. ISBN 90-04-15567-8.
- Hoyland, Robert (2001). Arabia and the Arabs: From the Bronze Age to the Coming of Islam. London and New York: Routledge. ISBN 0-415-19534-9.
- Kennedy, Hugh (2004) [1986]. The Prophet and the Age of the Caliphates: The Islamic Near East from the 6th to the 11th Century (Second ed.). Harlow: Longman. ISBN 978-0-582-40525-7.
- Retso, Jan (2003). The Arabs in Antiquity: Their History from the Assyrians to the Umayyads. Abingdon and New York: Routledge. ISBN 0-7007-1679-3.
- Salibi, Kamal S. (January 1961). "The Buḥturids of the Garb. Mediaeval Lords of Beirut and of Southern Lebanon". Arabica. 8 (1): 74–97. doi:10.1163/157005861X00043. JSTOR 4054971.
- Salibi, Kamal S. (July 1973). "The Secret of the House of Ma'n". International Journal of Middle East Studies. 4 (3): 272–287. doi:10.1017/S0020743800031469. JSTOR 162160. S2CID 163020137.
- Shahid, Irfan (1985). Byzantium and the Arabs in the Fourth Century. Washington, D.C.: Dumbarton Oaks and Research Library. ISBN 0-88402-116-5.
- Shahid, I. (2000). "Tanūkh". In Bearman, P. J.; Bianquis, Th.; Bosworth, C. E.; van Donzel, E. & Heinrichs, W. P. (eds.). The Encyclopaedia of Islam, Second Edition. Volume X: T–U. Leiden: E. J. Brill. pp. 190–192. ISBN 978-90-04-11211-7.
- Shahid, Irfan (2010). Byzantium and the Arabs in the Sixth Century, Volume 2, Part 2. Harvard University Press. ISBN 9780884023470.
- van Midden, Lia (1993). Polyphonia Byzantina: Studies in Honour of Willem J. Aerts. Egbert Forsten. ISBN 9789069800547.
- Zakkar, Suhayl (1971). The Emirate of Aleppo: 1004–1094. Beirut: Dar al-Amanah. OCLC 759803726.
