= Amr ibn Adi =

First Lakhmid king (died 302 CE)

- King of the Lakhmid state
- Reign: CE 268–295
- Predecessor: none
- Successor: Imru' al-Qays I ibn 'Amr
- Died: 302
- Issue: Imru' al-Qays I ibn 'Amr
- House: Lakhmids

Amr ibn Adi ibn Nasr ibn Rabi'a (Arabic: عمرو بن عدي بن نصر بن ربيعة, romanized: ʿAmr ibn ʿAdī ibn Naṣr ibn Rabīʿa), commonly known as Amr I, was the semi-legendary first king of the Lakhmid Kingdom.

== Biography ==
Most of the details of his life are legendary and later inventions; according to Charles Pellat, "as the historical reality of this personage and of the events [...] became blurred, legend made use of his name to fix the time of events displaced from their historical sequence, and of stories invented to explain proverbs which had become unintelligible".

According to the medieval Arab historians, Amr's father Adi gained the hand of Raqash, the favourite sister of the Tanukhid king Jadhima al-Abrash, by a ruse. Amr is said to have been abducted as a child by a jinn, before being returned to his uncle. He is then said to have been left behind as regent by Jadhima, who marched against al-Zabba (Zenobia), the Arab queen of Palmyra. When his uncle was killed in battle, Amr vowed to avenge his death; even after Zenobia denied him this chance by committing suicide, he stabbed her corpse. (Note: The Arabic sources attribute the fall of Zenobia to Amr, and completely ignore the historical wars between Zenobia and the Roman emperor Aurelian.)

After his uncle's death, Amr broke away from Tanukhid overlordship and established the independent Lakhmid dynasty. According to the 10th-century historian al-Tabari, Amr resettled the abandoned town of al-Hira, and ruled there for 118 years—although in another place al-Tabari gives Amr's entire lifespan as 120 years—before being succeeded by his son Imru al-Qays I ibn Amr as client king on behalf of the Sassanid Persians. Most medieval Arab historians agree with this, and only al-Ya'qubi gives the length of his reign as a plausible 55 years.

Amr was doubtless a historical figure, but it is difficult to establish exact facts on his reign, other than that he lived in the later 3rd century (Armand-Pierre Caussin de Perceval suggested his reign as the period 268–288). The archaeological evidence supports his existence, but is contradictory: an inscription found at al-Namara names Amr and his son, but as clients of the Roman Empire rather than the Persians, whereas the Paikuli inscription indicates that Amr was a vassal of the Sassanid king Narseh (r. 293–302). The commonly accepted explanation is that Amr's son at some point defected to the Romans.

== Manichaeism ==
Amr was the most prominent patron of Manichaeism, and he gave shelter to the religion and managed to convince Narseh to put an end to the persecution of the Manichaeans. However, the persecution of the Manichaeans was resumed after the death of Narseh and the Lakhmid kingdom resumed its support of the Manichaeans.

== Sources ==
- Pellat, Ch. (1960). "ʿAmr b. ʿAdī". In Gibb, H. A. R.; Kramers, J. H.; Lévi-Provençal, E.; Schacht, J.; Lewis, B. & Pellat, Ch. (eds.). The Encyclopaedia of Islam, Second Edition. Volume I: A–B. Leiden: E. J. Brill. p. 450. doi:10.1163/1573-3912_islam_SIM_0631. OCLC 495469456.
- Rothstein, Gustav (1899). Die Dynastie der Lahmiden in al-Hîra. Ein Versuch zur arabisch-persichen Geschichte zur Zeit der Sasaniden [The Dynasty of the Lakhmids at al-Hira. An Essay on Arab–Persian History at the Time of the Sasanids] (in German). Berlin: Reuther & Reichard.
- Shahîd, Irfan (1985). Byzantium and the Arabs in the Fourth Century. Washington, DC: Dumbarton Oaks Research Library and Collection. ISBN 0-88402-116-5.
- Turner, John P. (2010). "ʿAmr b. ʿAdī". In Fleet, Kate; Krämer, Gudrun; Matringe, Denis; Nawas, John; Rowson, Everett (eds.). Encyclopaedia of Islam (3rd ed.). Brill Online. doi:10.1163/1573-3912_ei3_COM_23639. ISSN 1873-9830.

Preceded by Jadhima al-Abrash as King of the Tanukhids	King of the Lakhmids late 3rd century	Succeeded by Imru al-Qays I ibn Amr
