= Banu Lakhm =

Arab tribe tracing their lineage back to Qahtan

Banu Lakhm (Arabic: بنو لخم)
- Kahlan, Qahtanite
- Nisba: Al-Lakhmī
- Location: Lower Mesopotamia (4th–7th centuries); Southern Syria and Palestine (4th–9th centuries)
- Descended from: Malik ibn 'Adiyy
- Religion: Arabian polytheism, Christianity, Gnosticism, and Manichaeism (most likely), later Sunni Islam

Map of the Arabian Peninsula in 600 AD, showing the various Arab tribes and their areas of settlement. The Lakhmids (yellow) formed an Arab monarchy as clients of the Sasanian Empire, while the Ghassanids (red) formed an Arab monarchy as clients of the Roman Empire A map published by the British academic Harold Dixon during World War I, showing the presence of the Arab tribes in West Asia, 1914

The Banu Lakhm (Arabic: بنو لخم) was an Arab tribe best known for its ruling Nasrid, or more commonly, 'Lakhmid', house, which ruled as the Sasanian Empire's vassal kings in the buffer zone with the nomadic Arab tribes of northern and eastern Arabia in the 4th—6th centuries CE from their seat in al-Hirah in modern Iraq. After their first ruler Amr ibn Adi ibn Nasr (r. 293–302), nothing was mentioned of the Lakhmid kings in Iraq until the late 5th century when they emerged as commanders of Sasanian campaigns against nomadic Arab tribes and later the Arab allies of the Byzantine Empire.

A section of the Lakhm dwelt in Syria at least from the 4th century, during Byzantine rule, and remained allies of Byzantium until the Muslim conquest of Syria in the 630s. Thereafter, they became one the main tribes that made up the Umayyad Caliphate's Arab tribal soldiery in Palestine and were closely associated with the larger tribe of Judham.

== Iraq ==
The Lakhm is best known for its Nasrid, or more commonly 'Lakhmid', house, which ruled a vassal kingdom of the Persian Sasanian Empire in the 4th–6th centuries from its capital in al-Hira in Iraq (lower Mesopotamia). The founder of the Lakhmids' kingdom was Amr ibn Adi ibn Nasr, who is identified as the 'Amr ibn Lakhm' mentioned in two pre-Islamic inscriptions, one in Pahlavi/Parthian and the other in Coptic. His reign is traditionally dated to c. 293–302 CE.

Amr's successor, his son Imru al-Qays I ibn Amr, initially ruled over the Arab tribes of the upper Euphrates and the Syrian Desert before converting to Christianity and defecting to the Roman Empire. Little is heard again of the Lakhmids of Iraq until the 5th century. Irfan Shahid suspects this part of the tribe either migrated back to Iraq around that time or had remained there, not accompanying their king Imru al-Qays and the rest of the Lakhm to Syria (see below).

Lakhmid kings re-emerge in the 5th century as commanders in Sasanian campaigns against the Byzantines, rulers over the Arab tribes of northern Arabia, one-time power players in Sasanian succession politics, and builders of palaces in al-Hira. Lakhmid history in the 6th century was marked by the long reign of king al-Mundhir III (r. 503–554), who helped extend and protect Sasanian influence in southern and western Arabia, and the war with the Byzantines' Arab vassals, the Ghassanids of Syria. The last Lakhmid king, al-Nu'man III (r. 580–602) embraced Christianity and was assassinated by the Sasanian emperor Khosrow II. This brought an end to the Lakhmid kingdom, which inadvertently removed the Persians' bulwark against the Arab tribes in the deserts around Iraq and ultimately paved the way for the Arab Muslim conquest of Iraq in the 630s.

== Syria and Palestine ==
=== Byzantine period ===
According to the historians Henri Lammens and Irfan Shahid, the Lakhm's arrival to Syria dates to the 4th century, evidencing this on the Namara inscription, the epitaph of Imru al-Qays I ibn Amr found in southern Syria, which is dated to 328 CE.

The Lakhm of Syria dwelt in the southern parts of the region, near and among the tribes of Judham and Amila, though they were probably earlier-established there than both. The three tribes became closely allied and formed fictitious genealogical links, making them 'brother' tribes. In the period immediately preceding the Muslim conquest of Syria in the 630s, the older-established Lakhm was exceeded in prominence by the Judham and Amila, especially the former, which practically absorbed the tribe. On the eve of the conquest, the Lakhm lived in groups among the Judham in the region extending north of Tabuk through the desert region east of the Arabah Valley and Dead Sea up to the approaches of the Balqa. Part of the Lakhm also lived in southern Palestine, west of the Dead Sea.

=== Early Islamic period ===
The Islamic prophet Muhammad established contacts with clans of the Lakhm, but the tribe largely remained Christian and allied to the Christian Byzantine Empire along with the Judham. Both tribes fought on behalf of the Byzantines against the Muslims at the Battle of Mu'ta in c. 629 and were targeted, along with other Byzantine-allied Christian Arab tribes, in the Muslim raid on Tabuk in c. 630. At least ten men of the Lakhm's Banu al-Dar clan, including the famous Tamim al-Dari, conferred with Muhammad in his capital Medina and converted to Islam. To these men of the Banu al-Dar, Muhammad granted lands in southern Palestine, including Hebron and its surroundings, though these lands were under Byzantine control at the time and the grant only took effect after the Muslim conquest. Another clan of the tribe, the Banu Hadas, also refrained from joining the rest of the Lakhm at Mu'ta, though information about them is sketchy. In general, the bulk of the Lakhm stood with Byzantium.

During the Muslim conquest of Syria, Lakhm tribesmen were counted in the ranks of the Arab tribal fighters led by the Ghassanid chief Jabala ibn al-Ayham in the Byzantine army at the Battle of Yarmouk in 636. Groups of the Lakhm were also counted in the Muslims' ranks as well. In the assessment of the historian Fred Donner, pre-existing divisions and rivalries within the Lakhm likely explain the participation of Lakhm tribesmen on both the Byzantine and Muslim sides at Yarmouk. The unclear allegiance of the Lakhm and Judham during the conquest is reflected in Caliph Umar's order to exclude them from shares in the war spoils around 638, which otherwise were to be equally divided among the Arab tribes in the Muslim ranks. Nonetheless, the Lakhm's and Judham's presence on the Muslim army's pay rolls indicates they were incorporated into the Muslim polity by this time.

Throughout the first century of Islamic rule, the Lakhm are almost always counted with the Judham as a single group in the sources. In the Battle of Siffin in 657, which pitted the governor of Syria, Mu'awiya ibn Abi Sufyan (r. 639–661), against Caliph Ali (r. 656–661), the Lakhm fought together with the Judham under the same banner and commander, Natil ibn Qays al-Judhami, for Mu'awiya's side. The same had occurred during the battle of Yarmouk and again when the two fought on behalf of Mu'awiya's son, the Umayyad caliph Yazid I, in the Syrian army which suppressed anti-Umayyad rebellions in the Hejaz (Medina and Mecca) in 682–683.

Along with the Judham, and the tribes of Kinana, Azd Sarat, Khuza'a, and Khath'am, the last four of which arrived with the conquest armies, the Lakhm formed the Arab tribal soldiery of Jund Filastin (military district of Palestine) during the early Islamic period, according to the 9th-century historian Khalifa ibn Khayyat. Another 9th-century historian, al-Ya'qubi, also names the constituents of the Arab tribes in Palestine as Lakhm, Judham, and Kinana, but omits the others, instead adding the Amila, Kinda, and Qays. The 10th-century historian al-Muhallabi mentions that Rafah, south of Gaza, was dominated by the Lakhm and Judham, though it is not clear which time period he is describing.

While the Lakhm of Syria and Palestine was almost invariably tied with the Judham, their nisba (epithet) continued to bs prestigious due to "its archaic flavour, the glorious memories which it recalled" of the kings of al-Hira, according to Lammens. As late as the 9th and 10th centuries, notable figures in Palestine continued to claim descent from the tribe, such as the scholar Sulayman ibn Ahmad al-Tabarani of Tiberias and the messianic anti-Abbasid rebel al-Mubarqa.

== Bibliography ==
- Athamina, Khalil (1994). "The Appointment and Dismissal of Khālid b. al-Walīd from the Supreme Command: A Study of the Political Strategy of the Early Muslim Caliphs in Syria". Arabica. 41 (2): 253–272. doi:10.1163/157005894X00191. JSTOR 4057449.
- Donner, Fred M. (1981). The Early Islamic Conquests. Princeton: Princeton University Press. ISBN 0-691-05327-8.
- Gil, Moshe (1997) [1983]. A History of Palestine, 634–1099. Translated by Ethel Broido. Cambridge: Cambridge University Press. ISBN 0-521-59984-9.
- Bosworth, C. Edmund (2012) [2000]. "Lakhmids". Encyclopaedia Iranica.
- Lammens, H. & Shahid, I. (1986). "Lakhm". In Bosworth, C. E.; van Donzel, E.; Lewis, B. & Pellat, Ch. (eds.). The Encyclopaedia of Islam, Second Edition. Volume V: Khe–Mahi. Leiden: E. J. Brill. p. 632. ISBN 978-90-04-07819-2.
- Schiettecatte, Jérémie; Arbach, Mounir (2016). "The Political Map of Arabia and the Middle East in the 3rd Century AD Revealed by a Sabaean Inscription - A View from the South". Arabian Archaeology and Epigraphy. 2: 176–196. doi:10.1111/aae.12071.
