= Qais =

Qais (Arabic: قیس) is an Arabic given name meaning lover or firm. “Qays” and “Qaiss” are alternatives of Qais.

Notable people with the name include:

- Imru' al-Qais (496–565), Arabic poet in the 6th century
  - Imru al-Qays (disambiguation), for namesakes
- Qais al-Marouni, (9th-10th century AD) medieval Maronite historian
- Kais Saied (born 1958), Tunisian President
- Qais Ashfaq (born 1993), British boxer
- Qais Abdur Rashid (575–661), legendary founding father of the Pashtuns
- Muhammad Qais-ud-Din (1937–2021), Bangladeshi academic, researcher and chemist
- Mohamed Mijarul Quayes (1960–2017), Bangladeshi diplomat
- Qais Khazali (born 1974), founder of the Iran-backed Special Groups
- Qais Essa (born 1975), Iraqi international football player
- Qais Akbar Omar (born 1982), Afghan-American writer
- Qais Al-Sindy (born 1967), Iraqi painter
- Kais al-Zubaidi (1939–2024), Iraqi film director
- Azzan bin Qais (died 1871), Sultan of Oman
