= Jadhima =

Arab tribal king of the 3rd-century CE

Jadhima (Arabic: جذيمة) known as al-Abrash or al-Waddah (both surnames meaning "the Leper") was a 3rd-century CE king of the Tanukh, one of the more powerful tribes of Arabia. Jadhima is an important figure in the historical and literary traditions of pre-Islamic Arabia.

== Biography ==
Details of Jadhima's life are known chiefly from later historical traditions. His historicity is established by the Umm al-Jimal inscription, written in Greek and Nabataean in c. 250, from which it can be concluded that he was a king of the Tanukhid tribe (Βασιλεὺς Θανουηνῶν) at some point in the second half of the 3rd century.

The sources differ on Jadhima's origin and parentage. Some sources consider him to be a member of the Azd tribe who joined the Tanukhid by marrying the sister of Malik ibn Zuhayr ibn Amr ibn Fahm; others consider the Fahmids to themselves be Azdites and name Jadhima as the son of Malik Ibn Fahm (the brother of Amr ibn Fahm). The South Arabian tradition differs entirely; making Jadhima the son of Amr ibn Rabi'a ibn Nasr, a subject of the Sassanid Persian king who has settled in al-Hira. According to Gustav Rothstein, the southern Arabic tradition is a later invention.

== Literary tradition ==
In medieval historical sources and literature, Jadhima is portrayed as a pivotal figure in pre-Islamic Arabia, especially in the Roman–Persian Wars fought over Middle Eastern supremacy. He is also credited with being the first Arab to use candles, wear sandals, and build catapults. Any historical kernel around which these traditions may be based is impossible to reconstruct today.

Numerous traditions around Jadhima and his companions and family became the subject of poetry and proverbial wisdom. Such episodes include his boon companions, the marriage of his sister Riqash to Adi, and his marriage to—and death by—al-Zabba, better known as Zenobia of Palmyra. There also poetic fragments attributed to him, and he is listed among the pre-Islamic poets by later anthologists. Jadhima was succeeded as king by his nephew Amr ibn Adi, the son of Riqash and Adi.

== Sources ==
- Kawar, I. (1965). "Ḏj̲ad̲h̲īma al-Abras̲h̲ or al-Waḍḍāḥ". In Lewis, B.; Pellat, Ch. & Schacht, J. (eds.). The Encyclopaedia of Islam, Second Edition. Volume II: C–G. Leiden: E. J. Brill. p. 365. doi:10.1163/1573-3912_islam_SIM_1907. OCLC 495469475.
- Rothstein, Gustav (1899). Die Dynastie der Lahmiden in al-Hîra. Ein Versuch zur arabisch-persichen Geschichte zur Zeit der Sasaniden [The Dynasty of the Lakhmids at al-Hira. An Essay on Arab–Persian History at the Time of the Sasanids] (in German). Berlin: Reuther & Reichard.
- Shahîd, Irfan (1985). Byzantium and the Arabs in the Fourth Century. Washington, DC: Dumbarton Oaks Research Library and Collection. ISBN 0-88402-116-5.
