= Al-Nu'man I ibn Imru al-Qays =

Sixth Lakhmid king (390–418)

- King of the Lakhmid state
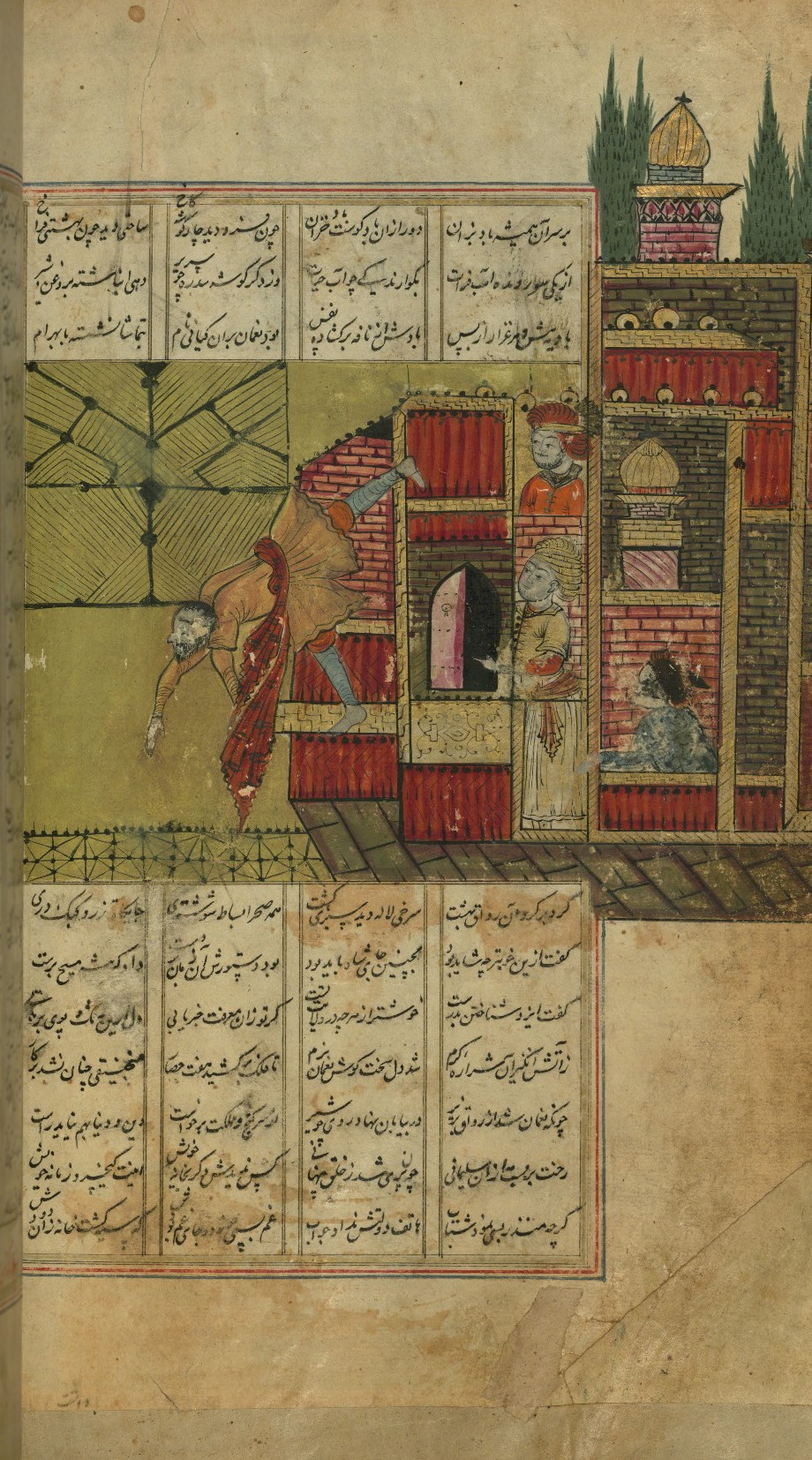
- 11th-century illustration of Nu'man throwing Sinnimar from the roof of the palace Khawarnaq.
- Reign: CE 390–418
- Predecessor: Imru al-Qays II ibn Amr
- Successor: Al-Mundhir I
- Born: CE 4th century
- Died: CE 5th century
- Issue: Al-Mundhir I
- House: Lakhmids
- Father: Imru al-Qays II ibn Amr
- Religion: Nestorian Christian

Al-Nu'man I ibn Imru' al-Qays (Arabic: النعمان بن امرؤ القيس), surnamed al-A'war (الأعور, "the one-eyed") and al-Sa'ih (السائح, "the wanderer/ascetic"), was the king of the Lakhmid Arabs (reigned ca. 390–418).

Nu'man was the son of Imru' al-Qays II ibn 'Amr and followed his father on the throne. He is best known for his construction of two magnificent palaces, the Khawarnaq and Sadir, near his capital al-Hirah, which were accounted by contemporary Arab lore among the wonders of the world. The Khawarnaq was built as a resort for his overlord, the Sasanian Persian shah Yazdegerd I (r. 399–420) and his son Bahram V (r. 420–438), who spent his childhood years there.

According to later Arab tradition, he renounced his throne and became an ascetic, after a reign of 29 years. He is also reputed to have visited the Christian hermit Symeon the Stylite between 413 and 420. He was succeeded by his son al-Mundhir I (r. 418–452), who played an important role by assisting Bahram V in claiming his throne after Yazdegerd's death and by his actions in the Roman–Sasanian War of 421–422.

== See also ==
- Sinnimar, architect for the palace Khawarnaq

== Sources ==
- Bosworth, C. E., ed. (1999). The History of al-Ṭabarī, Volume V: The Sāsānids, the Byzantines, the Lakhmids, and Yemen. SUNY Series in Near Eastern Studies. Albany, New York: State University of New York Press. ISBN 978-0-7914-4355-2.
- Shahîd, Irfan (1986). "Lakhmids". In Bosworth, C. E.; van Donzel, E.; Lewis, B. & Pellat, Ch. (eds.). The Encyclopaedia of Islam, Second Edition. Volume V: Khe–Mahi. Leiden: E. J. Brill. pp. 632–634. ISBN 978-90-04-07819-2.
- Shahîd, Irfan (1989). Byzantium and the Arabs in the fifth century. Dumbarton Oaks. ISBN 0-88402-152-1.
