= Namara inscription =

Ancient Arabic inscription

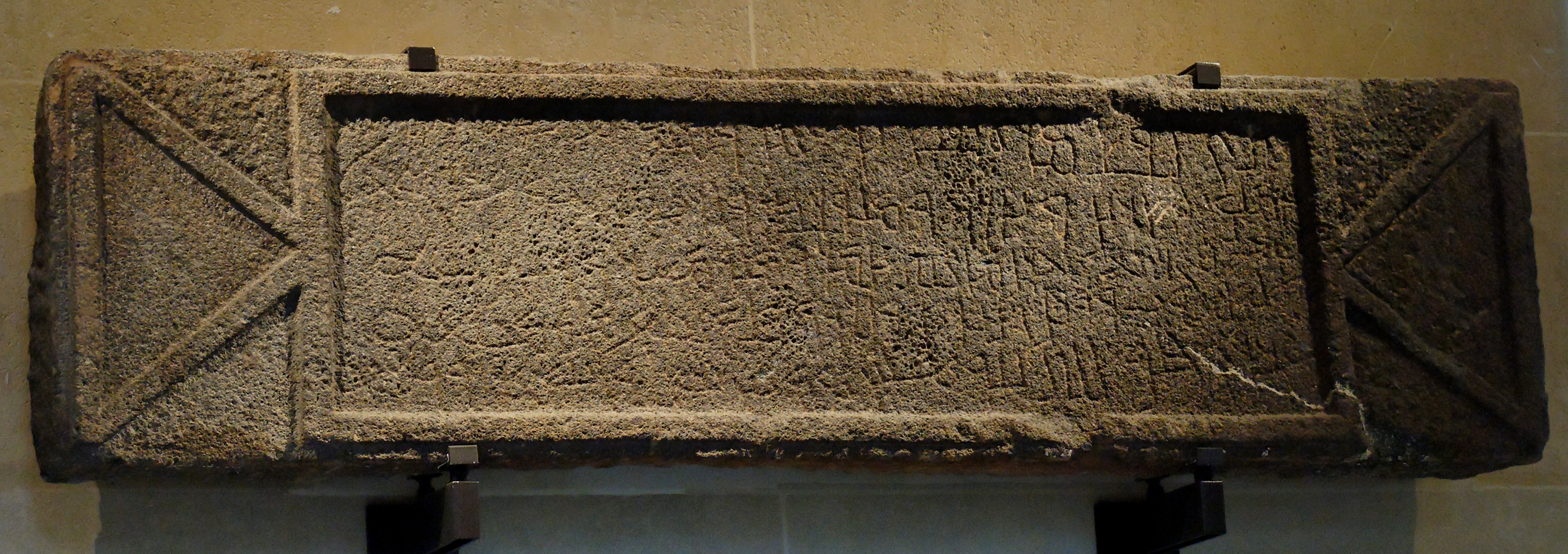
- Epitaph of Imru' al-Qays ibn 'Amr
- Material: Basalt
- Writing: Nabataean script
- Created: 7 December 328 (1697 years ago)
- Discovered: 4 April 1901 (124 years ago); Namara, Syria
- Discovered by: René Dussaud and Frédéric Macler
- Present location: Louvre Museum, Paris, France
- Language: Old Arabic (Nabataean dialect)

The Namara inscription (Arabic: نقش النمارة naqš an-Namārah) is a 4th century inscription in the Arabic language, making it one of the earliest. It has also been interpreted as a late version of the Nabataean script in its transition to Arabic script. It has been described by Irfan Shahid as "the most important Arabic inscription of pre-Islamic times" and by Kees Versteegh as "the most famous Arabic inscription". It is also an important source for the relationships between the Romans and the Arabs in that period. It is currently on display at the Louvre Museum in France, with identification number AO 4083. It is known in academic corpora as RES 483.

== Discovery ==
The inscription was found on 4 April 1901 by two French archaeologists, René Dussaud and Frédéric Macler, at al-Namara (also Namārah; south of Al-Safa, near Shahba and Jabal al-Druze in southern Syria, about 100 kilometers (62 miles) south of Damascus and 50 kilometers (31 miles) northeast Bosra, and 120 kilometers (75 miles) east of the Sea of Galilee. The location was near the boundary of the Roman Empire at the date it was carved, the Limes Arabicus of the province of Arabia Petraea. Al-Namara was later the site of a Roman fort.

== Historical background ==
The inscription is carved in five lines on a block of basalt, which may have been the lintel for a tomb. It is the epitaph of a recently deceased Arab king of the Lakhmids, Imru' al-Qays ibn 'Amr, and dated securely to AD 328. Imru' al-Qays followed his father 'Amr ibn Adi in using a large army and navy to conquer much of Iraq and the Arabian Peninsula from their capital at al-Hirah. At this time, they were vassals of the Persian Sassanids. Raids on Iran triggered a campaign by Sassanid emperor Shapur II which conquered the Iraqi lands, and Imru' al-Qays retreated to Bahrain. He moved to Syria to seek help from the Roman emperor Constantine. Imru' al-Qays converted to Christianity before his death in Syria and was entombed in the Syrian Desert. His conversion is mentioned in the Arab history of Hisham Ibn Al-Kalbi, an early ninth century scholar, but Irfan Shahîd notes "there is not a single Christian formula or symbol in the inscription." While Theodor Nöldeke argued against a Christian affiliation of Imru' al Qays bin 'Amr, Shahid noted that his Christian belief could be "heretical or of the Manichaean type".

The first tracing and reading of the Namara inscription was published in the beginning of the twentieth century by René Dussaud. According to his reading, the text starts by informing the reader that this inscription was the burial monument of the king, then it introduces him and lists his achievements, and finally announces the date of his death. Many other scholars have re-read and analyzed the language of the inscription over the last century but, despite their slight differences, they all agreed with Dussaud's central viewpoint that the Namara stone was the burial monument of King Imru' al-Qays. In 1985, James A. Bellamy offered the first significantly different tracing of the inscription since Dussaud, including a breakthrough tracing correction of two highly contested words in the beginning of the third line (pointed out on Dussaud's original tracing figure as words 4 and 5). However, despite Bellamy's new important re-tracings, his Arabic reading fully agreed with the general theme of Dussaud's original reading.

== Translation ==
Bellamy's widely accepted new translation of the inscription reads:

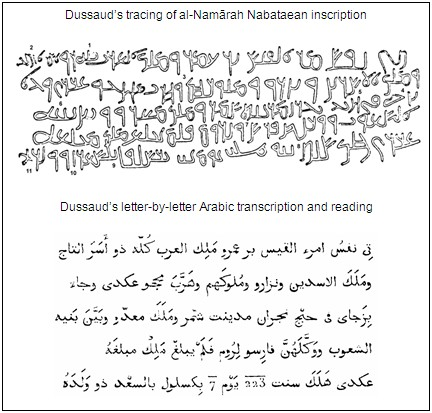
The original tracing and reading of the Namara inscription that was published by René Dussaudin 1905 (numbers added to facilitate discussion in this article)

This is the funerary monument of Imru' al-Qays, son of 'Amr, king of the Arabs, and (?) his title of honor was Master of Asad and Nizar.
And he subdued the Asadis and they were overwhelmed together with their kings, and he put to flight Madhhij thereafter, and came
driving them to the gates of Najran, the city of Shammar, and he subdued Ma'add, and he dealt gently with the nobles
of the tribes, and appointed them viceroys, and they became phylarchs for the Romans. And no king has equalled his achievements.
Thereafter he died in the year 223 on the 7th day of Kaslul. Oh the good fortune of those who were his friends!

Below is Bellamy's modern Arabic translation of the Namara inscription, with brief added explanations between parenthesis:

تي (هذه) نَفسُ (شاهدة قبر) امرؤ القيس بن عَمرو مَلِكُ العرب كله، ولقبهُ ذو أسَد ومذحج.

ومَلَكَ الأسديين ونزار وملوكهمْ وهَرَّبَ مذحج عَكدي (كلمة عامية تدمج الكلمتين "عن قضى"، بمعنى بعد ذلك) وجاء (اي امرؤ القيس) يزجها (يقاتلها بضراوة) في رُتِجِ (ابواب) نَجران، مدينة شمّر، ومَلَكَ معد (بنو مَعَدْ في اليمن) ونَبَلَ بنَبه الشعوب (عامل نبلاءهم باحترام ولطف) ووكلهن (اي عين نبلاءهم شيوخا للقبائل) فرأسو لروم (فاعترفو بسيادة روم عليهم) فلم يبلغ ملك مَبلَغَه.

عكدي (بعد ذلك) هلك سَنَة 223، يوم 7 بكسلول (كانون الأول)، يالِسَعْدِ ذو (الذي) والاهُ (بايعه او جعله وليا له).

The mention of the date – the 7th of Kaslul in the year 223 of the Nabatean era of Bostra – securely dates his death to the 7th day of December in AD 328.

== See also ==
- Jabal Dabub inscription
