= Imru al-Qays II ibn Amr =

Fifth Lakhmid king (368–390)

- King of the Lakhmid state
- Reign: CE 368–390
- Predecessor: Aws ibn Qallam
- Successor: al-Nu'man I
- Born: CE 4th century
- Died: unknown
- Issue: al-Nu'man I
- House: Lakhmids
- Religion: Nestorian Christian

Imru al-Qays ibn Amr ibn Imru al-Qays (Arabic: امرؤ القيس بن عمرو بن امرؤ القيس, romanized: Imruʾ al-Qays ibn ʿAmr ibn Imruʾ al-Qays), commonly known as Imru al-Qays II, was the fifth king of the Lakhmid Kingdom at al-Hira, ruling from 368 to 390.

As with most 4th-century Lakhmid rulers, little is known of him, and even the chronology of his reign is approximate. He was called Muhrik ("incendiarist") by his contemporary poets, because he used to mark the faces of rebels with a hot metallic marker.

He was succeeded by his son al-Nu'man I (r. 390–418).
