= Lakhmid kingdom =

Arab monarchy (c. 268–602)

Lakhmid kingdom المناذرة
- c. 293–602
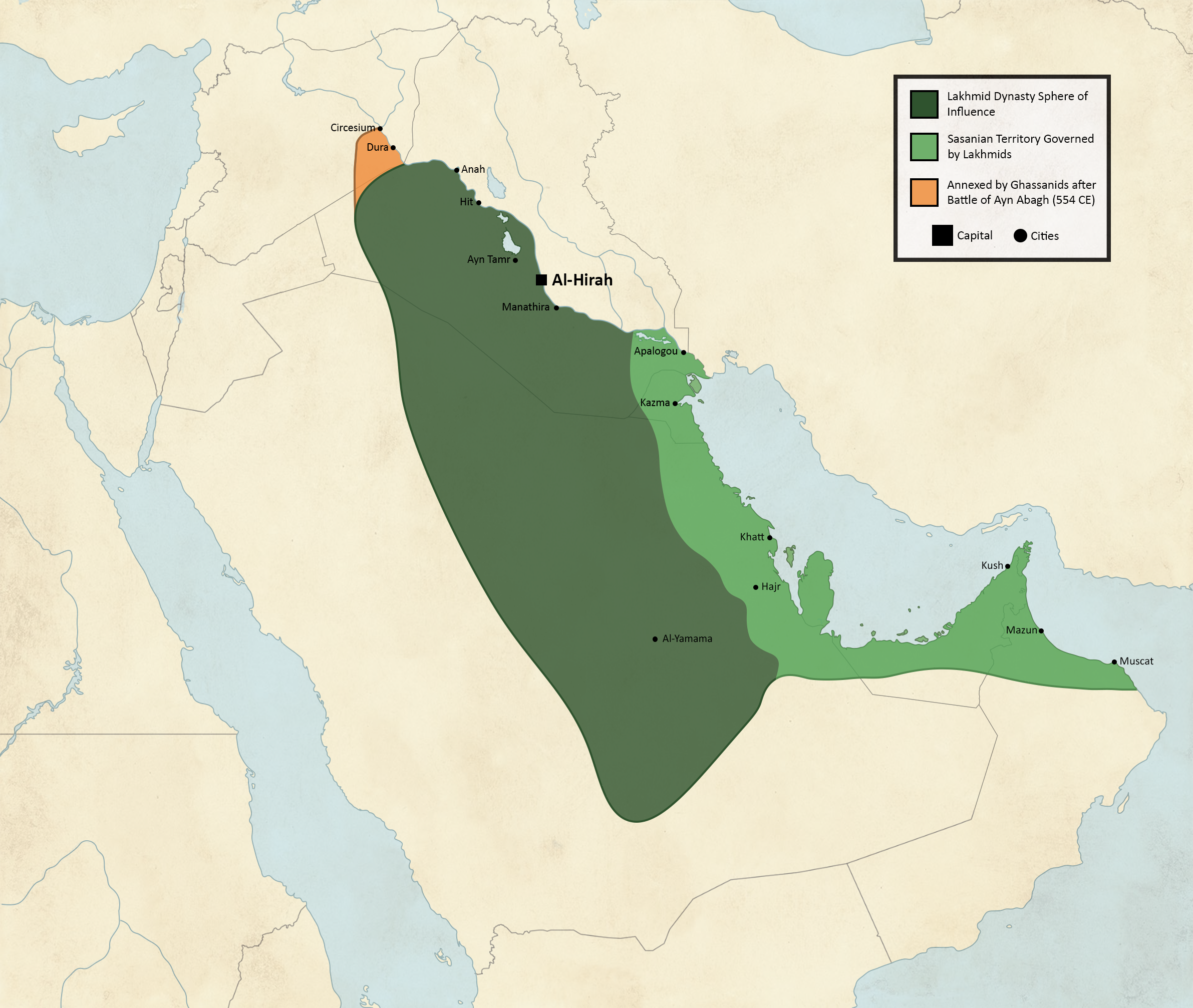
- Lakhmid Kingdom Lakhmid-governed Sassanid territory Lost in Battle of Ayn Abagh (554 CE)
- Status: Dependency of the Sasanian Empire
- Capital: Al-Hira
- Common languages: Arabic (spoken, literary, court); Syriac (spoken, literary); Middle Persian (court)
- Religion: Church of Seleucia-Ctesiphon (official); Arab paganism (unofficial)
- Government: Monarchy
- History
  - Established: c. 293
  - Annexed by the Sasanian Empire: 602
Succeeded by
Sasanian Empire

The Lakhmid kingdom (Note: While the term "Lakhmids" has been applied to this kingdom's ruling dynasty, more recent scholarship prefers to refer to them as the Naṣrids.) (Arabic: اللخميون al-Lakhmiyyūn), also known as al-Manādhirah (المناذرة), was an Arab kingdom that ruled parts of Southern Mesopotamia and northeastern Arabia from the late 3rd century until 602 CE. Governed by the Nasrid dynasty of the Banu Lakhm tribe, the kingdom was centered on Al-Hira, which served as its capital and political base.

The Lakhmids functioned as a client state of the Sasanian Empire, playing a key role in defending Persia's western frontier. As part of this position, they frequently opposed the Ghassanids, a rival Arab polity allied with the Roman Empire, and participated in the Roman–Persian wars of late antiquity.

The kingdom was dissolved in 602 when the Sasanian ruler Khosrow II deposed and executed its last king, Al-Nu'man III, bringing the Lakhmid territories under direct Persian control. The fall of the Lakhmids marked a significant shift in the balance of power along Persia's Arab frontier and preceded major conflicts between Arab forces and the Sasanian state in the early 7th century.

== "Lakhmid" or "Nasrid" ==
The designation "Lakhmids" or "Lakhmid kingdom" is disputed, and some historians prefer to describe this group as the "Nasrids", the name of the ruling dynasty of this group. The name "Lakhmid" is derived exclusively from one inscription from the late third century, the Paikuli inscription, which refers to the "Amr of the Lakhm", then the Nasrid ruler, as one of the vassals of the Sasanian Empire. However, as historian Greg Fisher points out, there is "no reason to suppose that any connection between Nasrid leaders and Lakhm that may have existed in the third century was still present in the sixth, or that the Nasrids ruled over a homogeneous Lakhmid kingdom". This situation is exacerbated by the fact that the historical sources—mostly Byzantine—start dealing with the Lakhmids in greater detail only from the late 5th century, as well as by the relative lack of archaeological work at Al-Hira.

== History ==
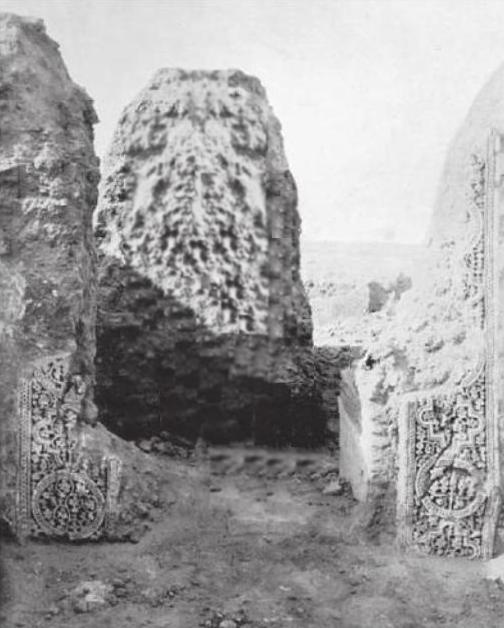
The ruins of a building in al-Hira, the Lakhmids' capital city,

=== Founding ===
The Lakhmids appear to have emerged soon after the emergence of the Sasanian Empire, in the late third century, appearing in the western frontiers of their sphere of hegemony. The capital of the kingdom was set up at Al-Hira, located in south-central modern Iraq. The founder of the Lakhmids' kingdom was Amr ibn Adi, who is identified as the 'Amr ibn Lakhm' in two inscriptions: the Paikuli inscription, written in Pahlavi/Parthian, and a second Coptic inscription. His reign is traditionally dated to c. 293–302 CE. Islamic histories present all Lakhmid kings, going back to the earliest period, as members of the Nasrid dynasty (Banu Nasr). However, this is unlikely, and it is only the last of the Lakhmid kings who are likely to have been members of the Banu Nasr.

Little is heard again of the Lakhmids of Iraq until the 5th century. Irfan Shahid suspects this part of the tribe either migrated back to Iraq around that time or had remained there, not accompanying their king Imru al-Qays and the rest of the Lakhm to Syria (see below).

=== History and relations with the Persians ===
The earliest evidence of the Lakhmids acting in service of the Persians comes in the late third century, which lists the "king of the Lakhmids" as one of the vassals of the Sasanian king Narseh. In the fourth century, sources attest to the use of Sasanian-allied Arab tribes fighting against Roman forces. The rise of the Lakhmids as Sasanian allies can be understood in the context of the collapse of the Kingdom of Hatra and the Palmyrene Empire at the hands of the Romans around the same time, which previously dominated and buffered the region separating the Roman and Persian empires.

While later Arab sources portray the Lakhmids as strict subjects, and even slaves of the Persians, this image is unrealistic, influenced by later Abbasid notions of hierarchy and a delegitimization of pre-Islamic kingship. Though clients to the Persians, the Lakhmids also maintained a real geopolitical presence, with their own substantial territories, a major capital city, stable institutions, and a real army.

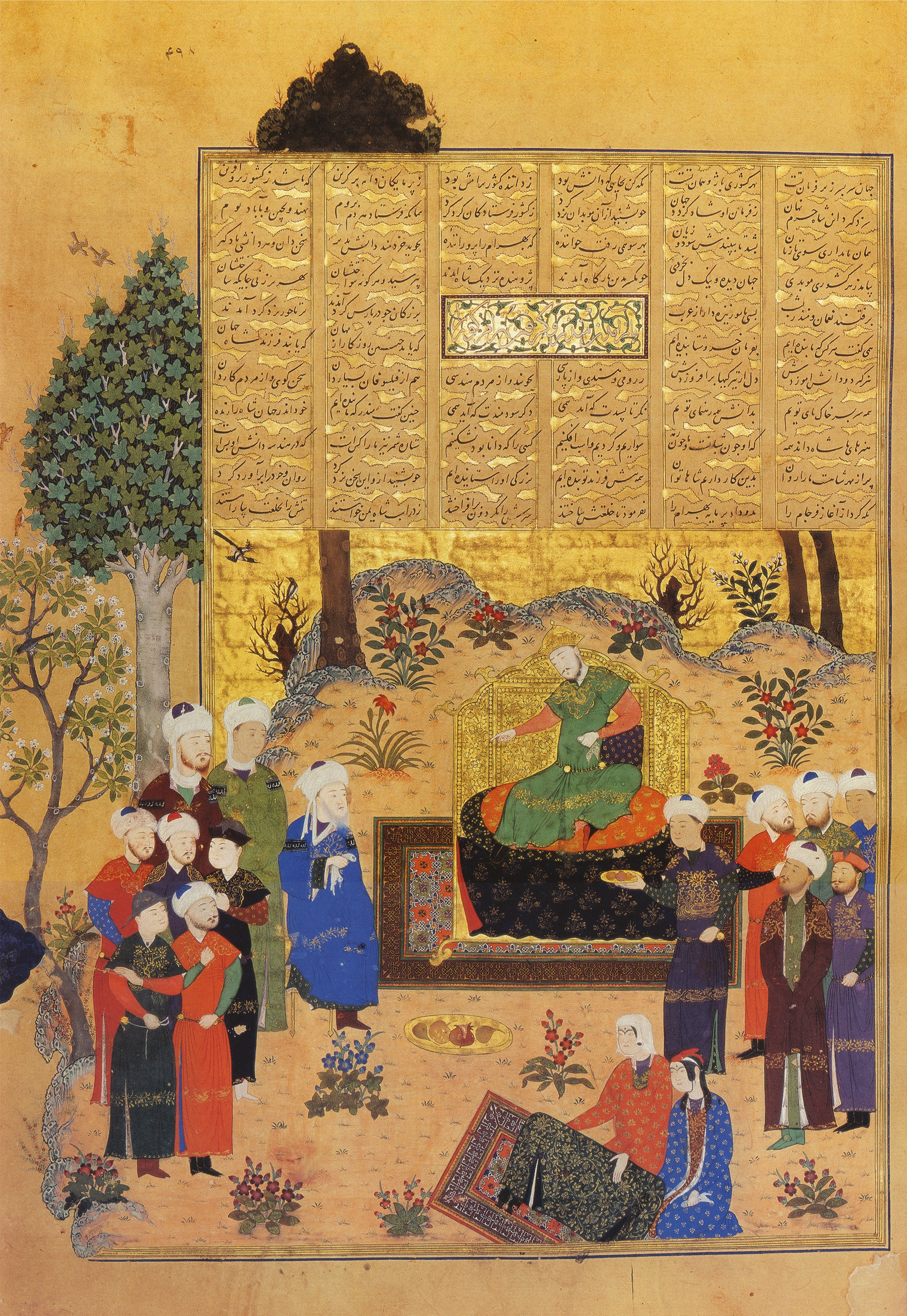
The Sasanian emperor Yazdegerd I entrusted the guardianship of his son Bahram V to the Lakhmid ruler al-Nu'man I ibn Imru' al-Qays. Miniature From the Baysunghur Shahnameh.

In the sixth century, as the late Sasanian state became increasingly centralized and more formally administered, the Lakhmids became more formal subordinates of the Persian empire. At this time, the main function that the Lakhmids served for the Persians was to project Persian hegemony into the Arabian Peninsula, protect the Sasanian Empire from incursions by aggressive nomadic Arab tribes, and in the sixth century, to serve as a counterbalance against the main Arab client kingdom and ally of the Romans, the Ghassanids. The most successful Lakhimd king, in this regards, was Al-Mundhir III ibn al-Nu'man, who reigned for around fifty years (c. 505–554) and defeated the Ghassanids at the famous Battle of Callinicum in 531 AD. A peace treaty between the Romans and the Sasanians a few decades later, in 561, indicates that the Romans were paying tribute to Al-Mundhir III to prevent him from attacking them. However, this apogee began to decline with the death of Al-Mundhir III, and in the second half of the sixth century, Lakhmid affairs became less common and the Persians began intervening with them more often.

=== Fall of the Lakhmids and the Muslim conquests ===
The Lakhmids remained influential throughout the sixth century. Nevertheless, in 602, the last Lakhmid king, al-Nu'man III ibn al-Mundhir, was deposed by the Sasanian emperor Khosrow II. According to one account by the Arab scholar Abu ʿUbaidah (d. 824), this was done out of spite, as al-Nu'man refused to marry the daughter of the emperor. This account, however, is treated as fantastical and with suspicion by historians. An alternative account of events by Hisham ibn al-Kalbi lacks this element. In either account, however, the fall of the Lakhmids, the Arab client kingdom of the Sasanians, paves the way for the defeat of the Sasanians to the Arab tribal confederation Banu Bakr at the Battle of Dhi Qar, only a few years later.

Coupled with increasing instability in Persia proper after the downfall of Khosrow in 628, these events heralded the decisive Battle of Qadisiyya in 636 and the Muslim conquest of Persia. Some believed that the annexation of the Lakhmid Kingdom was one of the main factors behind the fall of the Sasanian Empire and the Muslim conquest of Persia as the Sasanians were defeated in the Battle of Hira by Khalid ibn al-Walid. At that point, the city was abandoned and its materials were used to reconstruct Kufa, its exhausted twin city.

== Culture ==
Al-Hiran elites likely underwent formal education along with young Persian elites. Pre-Islamic Arabic poetry from Al-Hira, the Lakhmid capital, portrays the Lakhmids as Arab tribal chiefs who listen to the panegyric poetry of the Bedouin. They are presented as adopters and enjoyers of the famous wine culture of the Persian ruling class, which itself went on to later influence depictions of wine culture in Abbasid-era poetry. Their participation in Persian culture is also shown from their adoption of other elements of Sasanian court culture, particularly in Persian styles of accessories and furniture. While these representations play into Islamic-era associations of Persian culture with luxury, this image also finds some support from archaeological findings at Al-Hiran sites, as well as linguistics, as many Arabic loanwords from Persian are refer to luxury items (including musical instruments, architecture, high cuisine, etc).

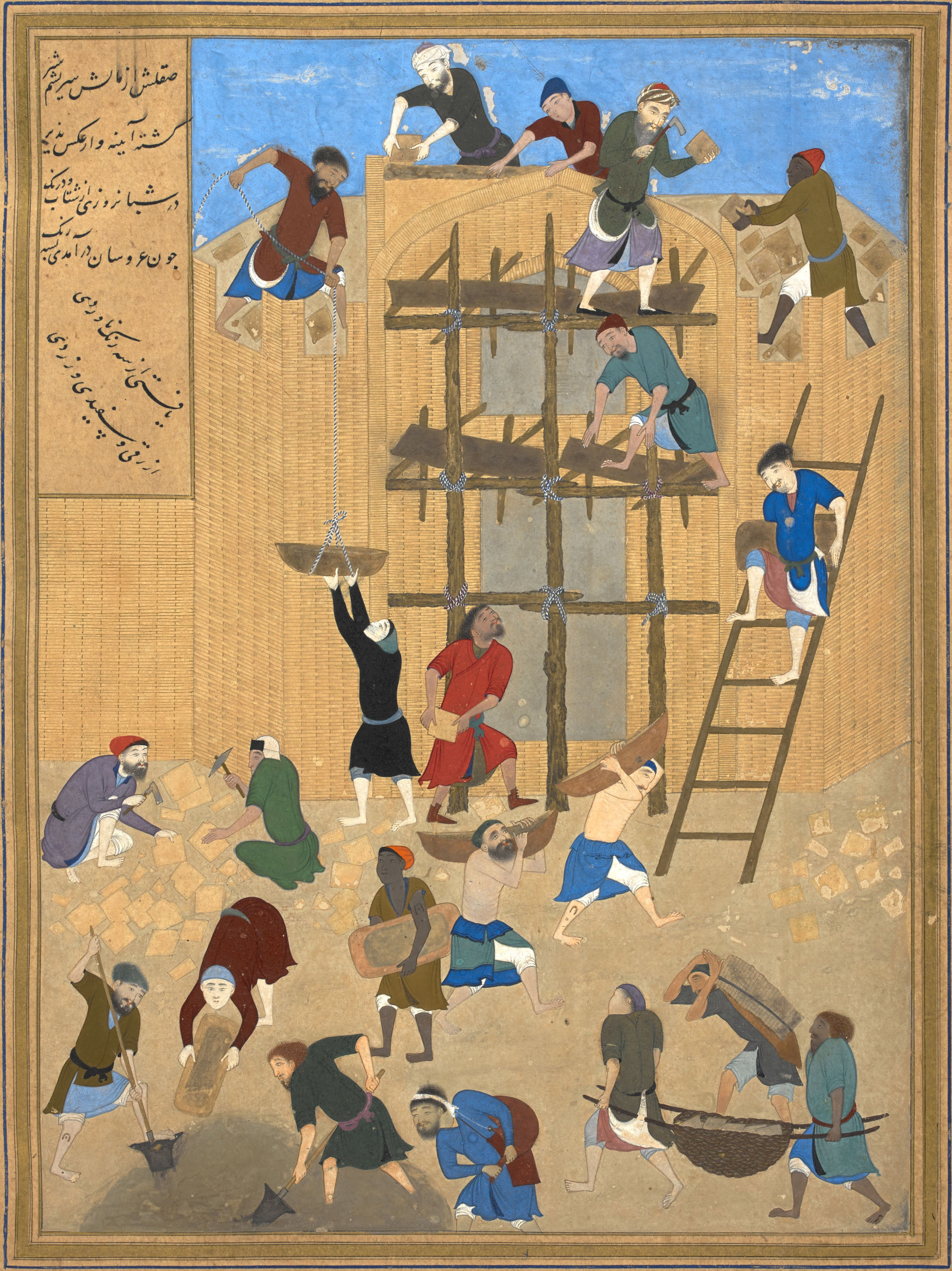
A Persian manuscript from the 15th century describing the constructing of al-Khawarnaq Castle in al-Hirah.

== Architecture ==
A seminal and one of the most celebrated constructions of the Lakhmid kingdom, built near Al-Hira, was the Khawarnaq Palace. Purportedly, it was constructed by Al-Nu'man I, to accommodate the young Sasanian prince Bahram V while he was being brought up at the Lakhmid court.

According to later tradition, the legendary Byzantine architect Cenmar was recruited by the Lakhmid court to create the design for the construction of the palace. After completing the design, Cenmar was killed, to prevent him from designing a similar castle for another person.

The Lakhmids constructed countless monasteries. Among two of the most famous ones, were the Monastery of Hind the Elder and the Monastery of Hind the Younger. The two monasteries share the same namesake, two royals of the Lakhmids named Hind, separated by three generations.

== Religion ==
The Lakhmids were pagan, but this began to change with the growth of Christianity in the kingdom. Eventually, the final Lakhmid king, al-Nu'man III ibn al-Mundhir, converted to Christianity.

Initially, the Lakhmids, affiliated with the Zoroastrian Sasanian Empire, originally had a volatile relationship with their Christian minority, shifting between phases of acceptance and open persecution depending on the state of relations with Christian Romans. An attitude of tolerance also grew as, during the fifth century, Christianity became a larger and larger religion in the Persian realm. Instead, an independent Persian Church was fostered, dogmatically independent of the Roman Church. The same trend followed in the Lakhmid capital, in Al-Hira. Christianity was introduced in the fourth century into the city, and its growth by the fifth and sixth centuries, as well as the Christianization of the Hiran urban elite, turned patterns of persecution into a broader tolerance. By 410 AD, Al-Hira had a bishop.

Christianity went on to have a long history at the Lakhmid capital Al-Hira, even before the conversion of the final ruler. Al-Hira became a major base for missionary activity, acting as a gateway for launching missions to the rest of the Sasanian world, on the one hand, and the Arabs of the desert, on the other. Some of the most detailed information about the Christianity of the Lakhmid A-Hira comes from the Chronicle of Seert which, despite its late final date, is likely a redaction of multiple earlier records, including some written down very close to the events. (Independent records for this history are also found in the Khuzistan Chronicle and the Arabo-Islamic tradition.) The Chronicle records the missionary activities of the great monastic founder, Abraham of Kashkar, at Al-Hira. It also talks about how many of the Lakhmid kings engaged with the Christian presence of the city, and a long account of the final king, who did convert.

Al-Nu'man III's conversion is said to have been precipitated by Simeon Jabara, the bishop of Al-Hira. The Persians did not look favorably on this conversion, and made efforts to reconvert him out of his new faith.

Before him, Al-Mundhir III, in the mid-6th century, had already married the princess Hind of the Hujrid dynasty of the Kingdom of Kinda. While he did not become a Christian, Hind converted to Christianity, and even sponsored the construction of a monastery in the Lakhmid capital.

The second Lakhmid king, Imru al-Qays I ibn Amr, is said in some sources to have converted to Christianity, defecting to the Roman Empire. However, this report is contentious, and is not considered credible by many.

== List of Lakhmid rulers ==
#	Ruler	Reign
1	'Amr I ibn Adi	268–295
2	Imru' al-Qays I ibn 'Amr	295–328
3	'Amr II ibn Imru' al-Qays	328–363
4	Aws ibn Qallam (non-dynastic)	363–368
5	Imru' al-Qays II ibn 'Amr	368–390
6	al-Nu'man I ibn Imru' al-Qays	390–418
7	al-Mundhir I ibn al-Nu'man	418–462
8	al-Aswad ibn al-Mundhir	462–490
9	al-Mundhir II ibn al-Mundhir	490–497
10	al-Nu'man II ibn al-Aswad	497–503
11	Abu Ya'fur ibn Alqama (non-dynastic, uncertain)	503–505
12	al-Mundhir III ibn al-Nu'man	503/5–554
13	'Amr III ibn al-Mundhir	554–569
14	Qabus ibn al-Mundhir	569–573
15	Suhrab (Persian governor)	573–574
16	al-Mundhir IV ibn al-Mundhir	574–580
17	al-Nu'man III ibn al-Mundhir	580–602
18	Iyas ibn Qabisah al-Ta'i (non-dynastic) with Nakhiragan (Persian governor)	602–617/618
19	Azadbeh (Persian governor) followed by the Muslim conquest of Persia	617/618–633

== Abbadid descendants ==
The Abbadid dynasty, which ruled the Taifa of Seville in al-Andalus in the 11th century, was of Lakhmid descent.

== See also ==
- Kingdom of Hatra
- Tanukhids
- Christian Arabs
- Zayd ibn Amr

== Sources ==
- Al-Masudi (ca. 896–956), Abu al-Ḥasan ʿAlī ibn al-Ḥusayn ibn ʿAlī (1871) [1861], "44", Kitab Muruj adh-Dhahab wa-Ma'adin al-Jawhar (Les Prairies d'or), vol. III, translated by de Meynard, Charles Barbier; de Courteille, Pavet, Paris: Imprimerie imperiale, pp. 181–213.
  - History of the kings of Hirah, in The Fields of Gold
- Bosworth, C. E. (1983). "Iran and the Arabs Before Islam". In Yarshater, Ehsan (ed.). The Cambridge History of Iran: The Seleucid, Parthian and Sasanian Periods. Vol. 3(1). Cambridge: Cambridge University Press. pp. 593–612. ISBN 0-521-20092-X.
- Bosworth, C. E., ed. (1999). The History of al-Ṭabarī, Volume V: The Sāsānids, the Byzantines, the Lakhmids, and Yemen. SUNY Series in Near Eastern Studies. Albany, New York: State University of New York Press. ISBN 978-0-7914-4355-2.
- Debie, Muriel (2024). "The Arabs and Northern Languages and Scripts before Islam". In Vacca, Alison; Borrut, Antoine; Ceballos, Manuela (eds.). Navigating Language in the Early Islamic World: Multilingualism and Language Change in the First Centuries of Islam. Brepols. pp. 195–257.
- Fisher, Greg (2011). "Kingdoms or Dynasties? Arabs, History, and Identity before Islam". Journal of Late Antiquity. 4 (2): 245–267. doi:10.1353/jla.2011.0024. S2CID 56136927.
- Fisher, Greg; Wood, Philip (2015). "Arabs and Christianity". In Fisher, Greg (ed.). Arabs and Empires before Islam. Oxford University Press. pp. 276–372.
- Fisher, Greg (2019). Rome, Persia, and Arabia: Shaping the Middle East from Pompey to Muhammad. Routledge.
- Fisher, Greg (2021). The Roman World from Romulus to Muhammad: A New History. Routledge.
- Martindale, John R., ed. (1992). The Prosopography of the Later Roman Empire: Volume III, AD 527–641. Cambridge: Cambridge University Press. ISBN 0-521-20160-8.
- Landau-Tasseron, Ella (1995). "Ḏū Qār". In Yarshater, Ehsan (ed.). Encyclopædia Iranica. Vol. VII/6: Drugs–Ebn al-Aṯir. London and New York: Routledge & Kegan Paul. pp. 574–575. ISBN 978-1-56859-024-0.
- Munt, Harry (2015). "Arabic and Persian Sources for Pre-Islamic Arabia". In Fisher, Greg (ed.). Arabs and Empires before Islam. Oxford University Press. pp. 437–500.
- Robin, Christian Julien (2012). "Arabia and Ethiopia". In Johnson, Scott Fitzgerald (ed.). The Oxford Handbook of Late Antiquity. Oxford University Press. pp. 247–333.
- Rothstein, Gustav (1899). Die Dynastie der Lahmiden in al-Hîra. Ein Versuch zur arabisch-persichen Geschichte zur Zeit der Sasaniden [The Dynasty of the Lakhmids at al-Hira. An Essay on Arab–Persian History at the Time of the Sasanids] (in German). Berlin: Reuther & Reichard.
- Sauer, Eberhard (2017). Sasanian Persia: Between Rome and the Steppes of Eurasia. London and New York: Edinburgh University Press. ISBN 978-1474401012.
- Schiettecatte, Jérémie; Arbach, Mounir (2016). "The Political Map of Arabia and the Middle East in the 3rd Century AD Revealed by a Sabaean Inscription - A View from the South". Arabian Archaeology and Epigraphy. 2: 176–196. doi:10.1111/aae.12071.
- Shahîd, Irfan (1984). Byzantium and the Arabs in the Fourth Century. Dumbarton Oaks. ISBN 978-0884021162.
- Shahîd, Irfan (1995). "al-Nuʿman (III) b. al-Mund̲h̲ir". In Bosworth, C. E.; van Donzel, E.; Heinrichs, W. P. & Lecomte, G. (eds.). The Encyclopaedia of Islam, Second Edition. Volume VIII: Ned–Sam. Leiden: E. J. Brill. pp. 119–120. ISBN 978-90-04-09834-3.
- Talib, Adam (2013). "Topoi and Topography in the Histories of al-Ḥīra" (PDF). In Wood, Philip (ed.). History and Identity in the Late Antique Near East. Oxford University Press. pp. 123–147.
- Toral-Niehoff, Isabel (2013). "Late Antique Iran and the Arabs: The Case of al-Hira*". Journal of Persianate Studies. 6 (1–2). Brill: 115–126. doi:10.1163/18747167-12341252.
- Toral-Niehoff, Isabel (2018). "Imperial Contests and the Arabs: The World of Late Antiquity on the Eve of Islam" (PDF). In Salvatore, Armando; Tottoli, Robert; Rahimi, Babak; M. Fariduddin, Attar; Patel, Naznin (eds.). The Wiley Blackwell History of Islam. Wiley-Blackwell. pp. 59–76.
- Zarrinkub, Abdolhossein (1975). "The Arab conquest of Iran and its aftermath". In Frye, Richard N. (ed.). The Cambridge History of Iran: From the Arab Invasion to the Saljuqs. Vol. 4. Cambridge: Cambridge University Press. pp. 1–57. ISBN 0-521-20093-8.
