= Imru al-Qays I ibn Amr =

Second Lakhmid king (CE 295–328)

- King of the Lakhmid state
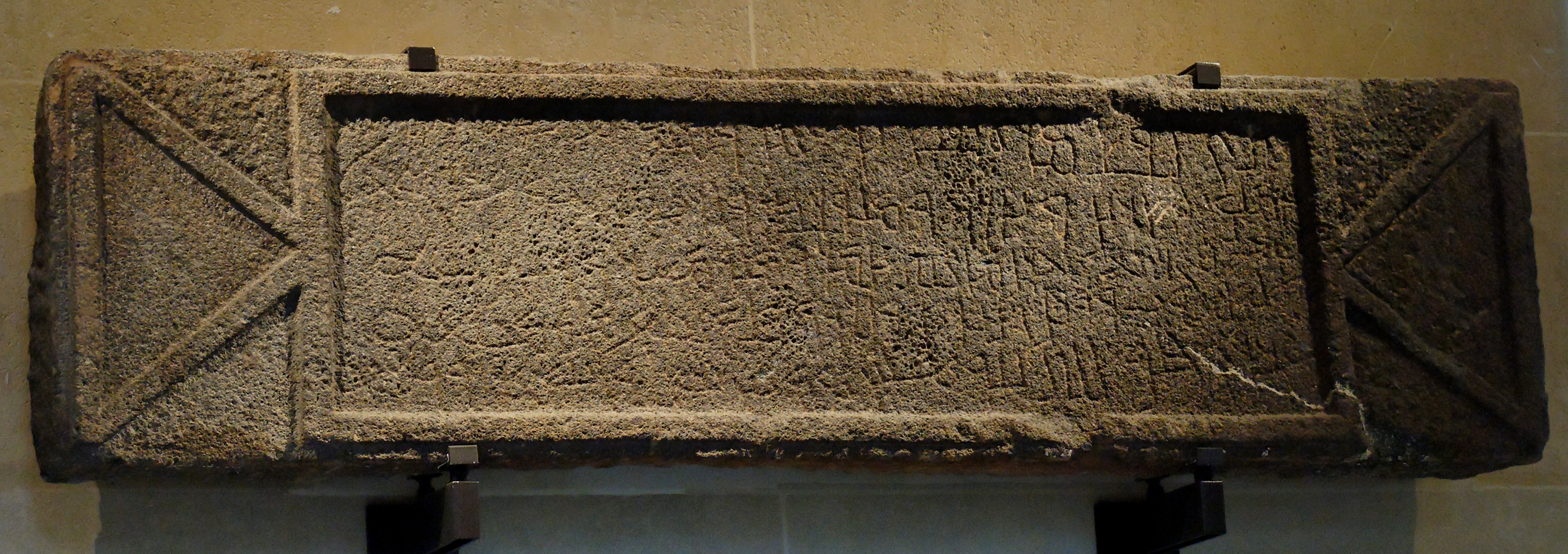
- The shrine of Imru al-Qays
- Reign: CE 295–328
- Predecessor: Amr I ibn Adi
- Successor: Amr II ibn Imru al-Qays
- Issue: Amr II ibn Imru al-Qays
- House: Lakhmids
- Father: Amr I ibn Adi
- Religion: Nestorian Church

Imru al-Qays ibn Amr ibn Adi (Arabic: امرؤ القيس بن عمرو بن عدي, romanized: Imruʾ al-Qays ibn ʿAmr ibn ʿAdī), commonly known as Imru al-Qays I, was the second Lakhmid king. His mother was Maria bint 'Amr, the sister of Ka'b al-Azdi. His name is recorded in the famous Namara inscription which is written using a kind of Nabataean Aramaic or Nabataean Arabic script.

Al-Tabari states that "he ruled for the Persians in all the land of the Arabs in Iraq, Hejaz and Mesopotamia". Imru al-Qays is called in his epitaph inscription: "The king of all Arabs who owned the crown," while the same title (king of all Arabs) was the title given to the kings of Hatra. The same inscription mentions that Imru al-Qays reached as far as Najran and besieged it from the king, Shammar Yahri'sh. Some scholars have identified "Imru al-Qays ibn Amr" in some South Arabian inscriptions with that one. In those same inscriptions his name is mentioned along with Shammar Yahri'sh, the Himyarite king.

== Name ==
The name Imru' al-Qais (in classical Arabic nominative Imru'u l-Qays(i) or Imra'a l-Qays(i), accusative Imra'a l-Qays(i), genitive Imri'i l-Qays(i)) means "man of Qais", (al-)Qais being the name of a pre-Islamic deity.

In his reading of the Namara inscription, J. Pedersen proposes transcribing his name as Mar'al-Qais. The Aramaic language word Mar means "Lord" and is used as a title to refer to saints, eg. Mar Jiryis, ie. Saint George. It also appears as part of an honorary title for God, ie. Mardalam ("Lord of the World"). The Arabs who carved the inscription in which Imru/Mar'al-Qais' name appears spoke Arabic but as the Arabic alphabet had not yet been fully developed, they used other alphabets of Aramaic or even Greek varieties.

== Religion ==
There is debate on his religious affinity: while Theodor Nöldeke noted that Imru al-Qays ibn 'Amr was not a Christian Irfan Shahid argued for a possible Christian affiliation, noting that Imru al-Qays' Christianity may have been "orthodox, heretical or of the Manichaean type". Furthermore, Shahid asserts that the Namara inscription which mentions Imru al-Qays ibn Amr lacks Christian formulas and symbols.

Preceded by 'Amr ibn Adi	Lakhmid King; 295-328	Succeeded by 'Amr ibn Imru' al-Qays
