= Al-Mundhir of Hira =

Al-Mundhir of Hira can refer to any of four Lakhmid rulers of al-Hira:

- al-Mundhir I ibn al-Nu'man (r. 418–462)
- al-Mundhir II ibn al-Mundhir (r. 490–497)
- al-Mundhir III ibn al-Nu'man (r. 503/5–554)
- al-Mundhir IV ibn al-Mundhir (r. 574–580)
