= Roman–Persian wars =

| Date | 54 BC – 628 AD (681 years) |
| Location | West Asia, (Note: Mesopotamia, Syria, Southern Levant, Transcaucasus, Atropatene, Elam, Media and Asia Minor.) Egypt, and Southeastern Europe (Note: Balkans and Aegean Sea.) |
| Result | Inconclusive |

Belligerents
| 54–27 BC: Roman Republic | 54–27 BC: Parthian Empire |
| 27 BC – 224 AD: Roman Empire | 27 BC – 224 AD: Parthian Empire |
| 224–395: Roman Empire | 224–395: Sasanian Empire |
| 395–628: Eastern Roman Empire | 395–628: Sasanian Empire |
| Clients/allies: Alans; Albania; Armenia; Aksum; Cappadocia; Commagene; Galatia; Germans; Ghassanids; Goths; Hatra; Heruli; Iberia; Khazars; Kinda; Lazica; Nabatea; Osroene; Palmyra; Pontus; Sophene; Tzani; Western Turkic Khaganate | Clients/allies: Abasgia; Adiabene; Albania; Armenia; Avars; Commagene; Daylamites; Hatra; Himyar; Iberia; Jews; Lakhmids; Lazica; Media Atropatene; Osroene; Pompeians; Sabirs; Sclaveni; Xionites |

Commanders and leaders
| Crassus †; Mark Antony; Nero; Trajan; Lucius Verus; Septimius Severus; Caracalla; Macrinus; Alexander Severus; Maximinus Thrax; Gordian III †; Valerian (POW); Balista; Carus (PKIA); Galerius; Constantius II; Julian †; Jovian; Valens; Anastasius I; Justinian; Tiberius II Constantine; Maurice; Phocas; Heraclius; Clients/allies: Hyrcanus II (POW); Phasael (POW); Herod; Artavasdes II of Armenia; Tigranes VI of Armenia; Antiochus IV of Commagene; Polemon II of Pontus; Aristobulus of Chalcis; Parthamaspates of Parthia; Sanatruq II †; Arshak II of Armenia; Mushegh I Mamikonian; Pharas the Herulian; Odaenathus; Gubazes I of Lazica; Sarosius of Alania; Vakhtang I of Iberia; Jabalah IV ibn al-Harith †; Gubazes II of Lazica; Tzath I of Lazica; Al-Harith ibn Jabalah; Al-Mundhir III ibn al-Harith; Ziebel | Surena; Orodes II; Artabanus III; Vologases I; Osroes I; Sinatruces II; Vologases IV; Ardashir I; Shapur I; Narseh; Shapur II; Bahram V; Yazdegerd II; Kavad I; Khosrow I; Khosrow II; Bahram VI; Clients/allies: Quintus Labienus (executed); Antigonus II Mattathias (executed); Artavasdes I of Media Atropatene; Tiridates I of Armenia; Monobazus II of Adiabene; Meharaspes of Adiabene; Mirian III of Iberia; 'Amr ibn Imru' al-Qays; Grumbates; Urnayr of Caucasian Albania; Al-Mundhir I ibn al-Nu'man; Al-Mundhir III ibn al-Nu'man; Gubazes II of Lazica; Al-Mundhir IV ibn al-Mundhir (POW); Stephen I of Iberia †; Nehemiah ben Hushiel (executed); Benjamin of Tiberias |

Casualties and losses
| ~1 million | ~1 million |

The Roman–Persian wars, also called the Roman–Iranian wars, took place between the Roman states and the Iranian empires, beginning with the Roman Republic and the Parthian Empire in 54 BC and ending with the Byzantine and the Sasanian empires in 628 AD. While the conflict between the two civilizations did involve direct military engagements, a significant role was played by a plethora of vassal kingdoms and allied nomadic tribes, which served as buffer states or proxies for either side. Despite nearly seven centuries of hostility, the Roman–Persian wars had an entirely inconclusive outcome, as both the Byzantines and the Sasanians were attacked by the Rashidun Caliphate as part of the early Muslim conquests. The Arab-Muslim offensives resulted in the collapse of the Sasanian Empire and largely confined the Byzantine Empire to Anatolia and southeastern Europe for the ensuing Arab–Byzantine wars.

Aside from shifts in the north, the Roman–Persian border remained largely stable for the duration of the conflict, albeit subject to an effective tug of war: towns, fortifications, and provinces were continually sacked, captured, destroyed, and traded, but neither side had the logistical strength or manpower to maintain such lengthy campaigns far from their borders, and thus neither could advance too far without risking stretching their frontiers too thin. Both sides did make conquests beyond the border, but in time, the balance was almost always restored. Although initially different in military tactics, the Romans and the Persians gradually adopted from each other, and by the second half of the 6th century, they were similar and evenly matched.

Ultimately, the expense of resources during the Roman–Persian wars proved catastrophic for both sides, as the prolonged and escalating warfare of the 6th and 7th centuries left them militarily exhausted and vulnerable in the face of the sudden emergence and expansion of the Rashidun army. Benefiting from the two empires' weakened conditions, the Rashidun Caliphate swiftly conquered Persia on the Sasanian front; and the Levant, the Caucasus, and Egypt and the rest of North Africa on the Byzantine front.

== Background ==
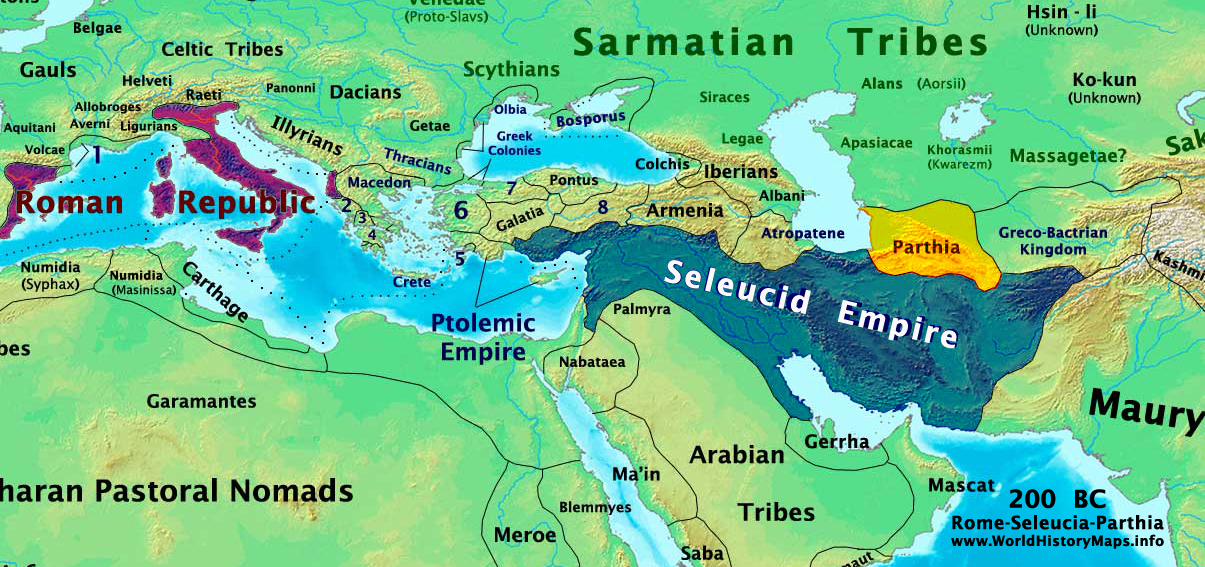
Rome, Parthia, and Seleucid Empire in 200 BC. Soon both the Romans and the Parthians would invade the Seleucid-held territories and become the strongest states in western Asia.

According to James Howard-Johnston, "from the third century BC to the early seventh century AD, the rival players [in the East] were grand polities with imperial pretensions, which had been able to establish and secure stable territories transcending regional divides". The Romans and Parthians came into contact through their respective conquests of parts of the Seleucid Empire. During the 3rd century BC, the Parthians migrated from the Central Asian steppe into northern Iran and established an independent state that steadily expanded at the expense of the Seleucids, and through the course of the 2nd and early 1st centuries BC, they had conquered Persia, Mesopotamia, and Armenia. Ruled by the Arsacid dynasty, the Parthians fended off several Seleucid attempts to regain their lost territories, and established several eponymous branches in the Caucasus, namely the Arsacid dynasty of Armenia, the Arsacid dynasty of Iberia, and the Arsacid dynasty of Caucasian Albania. Meanwhile, the Romans expelled the Seleucids from their territories in Anatolia in the early 2nd century BC, following the defeat of Antiochus III the Great at Thermopylae and Magnesia. Finally, in 64 BC, Pompey conquered the remaining Seleucid territories in Syria, extinguishing their state and advancing the Romans' eastern frontier to the Euphrates, where it met the territory of the Parthians.

== Roman–Parthian wars ==
=== Roman Republic vs. Parthia ===
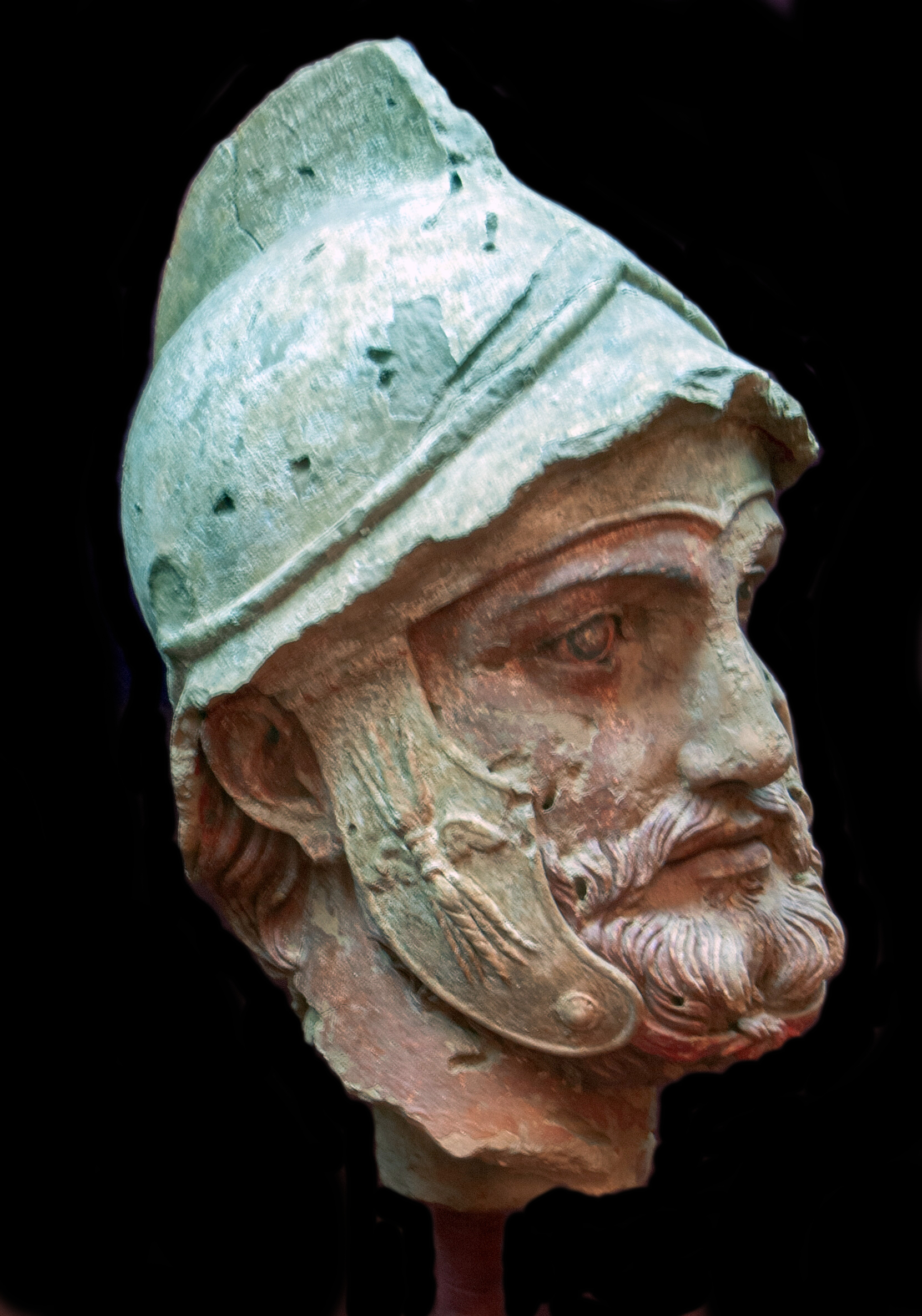
The Nisa helmeted warrior, a Hellenistic figure or deity, from the Parthian royal residence and necropolis of Nisa, Turkmenistan, 2nd century BC

Parthian enterprise in the West began in the time of Mithridates I and was revived by Mithridates II, who negotiated unsuccessfully with Lucius Cornelius Sulla for a Roman–Parthian alliance (c. 105 BC). When Lucullus invaded Southern Armenia and led an attack against Tigranes in 69 BC, he corresponded with Phraates III to dissuade him from intervening. Although the Parthians remained neutral, Lucullus considered attacking them. In 66–65 BC, Pompey reached an agreement with Phraates, and Roman–Parthian troops invaded Armenia, but a dispute soon arose over the Euphrates boundary. Finally, Phraates asserted his control over Mesopotamia, except for the western district of Osroene, which became a Roman dependency.

The Roman general Marcus Licinius Crassus led an invasion of Mesopotamia in 53 BC with catastrophic results; he and his son Publius were killed at the Battle of Carrhae by the Parthians under General Surena; this was the worst Roman defeat since the battle of Arausio. The Parthians raided Syria the following year, and mounted a major invasion in 51 BC, but their army was caught in an ambush near Antigoneia by the Romans, and they were driven back.

The Parthians largely remained neutral during Caesar's civil war, fought between forces supporting Julius Caesar and forces supporting Pompey and the traditional faction of the Roman Senate. However, they maintained relations with Pompey, and after his defeat and death, a force under Pacorus I assisted the Pompeian general Q. Caecilius Bassus, who was besieged at Apamea Valley by Caesarian forces. With the civil war over, Julius Caesar prepared a campaign against Parthia, but his assassination averted the war. The Parthians supported Brutus and Cassius during the ensuing Liberators' civil war and sent a contingent to fight on their side at the Battle of Philippi in 42 BC. After the Liberators' defeat, the Parthians invaded Roman territory in 40 BC in conjunction with the Roman Quintus Labienus, a former supporter of Brutus and Cassius. They swiftly overran the Roman province of Syria and advanced into Judea, overthrowing the Roman client Hyrcanus II and installing his nephew Antigonus. For a moment, the whole of the Roman East seemed lost to the Parthians or about to fall into their hands. However, the conclusion of the second Roman civil war soon revived Roman strength in Asia. Mark Antony had sent Ventidius to oppose Labienus, who had invaded Anatolia. Soon Labienus was driven back to Syria by Roman forces, and, although reinforced by the Parthians, was defeated, taken prisoner, and killed. After suffering a further defeat near the Syrian Gates, the Parthians withdrew from Syria. They returned in 38 BC but were decisively defeated by Ventidius, and Pacorus was killed. In Judaea, Antigonus was ousted with Roman help by Herod in 37 BC. With Roman control of Syria and Judaea restored, Mark Antony led a huge army into Atropatene, but his siege train and its escort were isolated and wiped out, while his Armenian allies deserted. Failing to make progress against Parthian positions, the Romans withdrew with heavy casualties. Antony was again in Armenia in 33 BC to join with the Median king against Octavian and the Parthians. Other preoccupations obliged him to withdraw, and the whole region came under Parthian control.

=== Roman Empire vs. Parthia ===
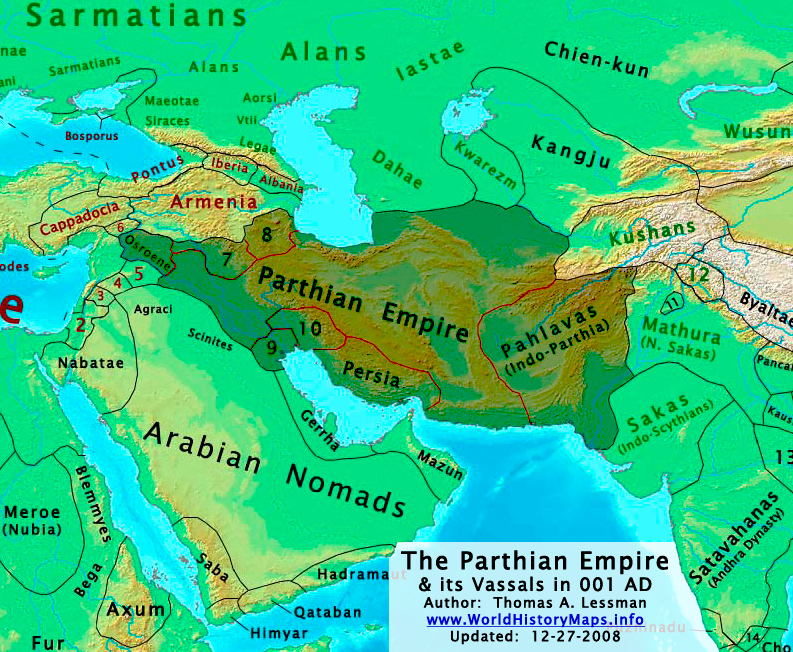
Parthia, its subkingdoms, and neighbors in 1 AD

With tensions between the two powers threatening renewed war, Octavian and Phraataces worked out a compromise in 1 AD. According to the agreement, Parthia undertook to withdraw its forces from Armenia and to recognize a de facto Roman protectorate there. Nonetheless, Roman–Persian rivalry over control and influence in Armenia continued unabated for the next several decades. War erupted in 58 AD, after the Parthian King Vologases I forcibly installed his brother Tiridates on the Armenian throne. Roman forces overthrew Tiridates and replaced him with a Cappadocian prince, triggering an inconclusive war. This came to an end in 63 AD after the Romans agreed to allow Tiridates and his descendants to rule Armenia on condition that they receive the kingship from the Roman emperor.

A fresh series of conflicts began in the 2nd century AD, during which the Romans consistently held the upper hand over Parthia. The Emperor Trajan invaded Armenia and Mesopotamia during 114 and 115 and annexed them as Roman provinces. He captured the Parthian capital, Ctesiphon, before sailing downriver to the Persian Gulf. However, uprisings erupted in 115 AD in the occupied Parthian territories, while a major Jewish revolt broke out in Roman territory, severely stretching Roman military resources. Parthian forces attacked key Roman positions, and the Roman garrisons at Seleucia, Nisibis and Edessa were expelled by the local inhabitants. Trajan subdued the rebels in Mesopotamia, but having installed the Parthian prince Parthamaspates on the throne as a client ruler, he withdrew his armies and returned to Syria. Trajan died in 117, before he was able to reorganize and consolidate Roman control over the Parthian provinces.

Trajan's Parthian War initiated a "shift of emphasis in the 'grand strategy of the Roman empire' ", but his successor, Hadrian, decided that it was in Rome's interest to re-establish the Euphrates as the limit of its direct control. Hadrian returned to the status quo ante, and surrendered the territories of Armenia, Mesopotamia, and Adiabene to their previous rulers and client-kings.

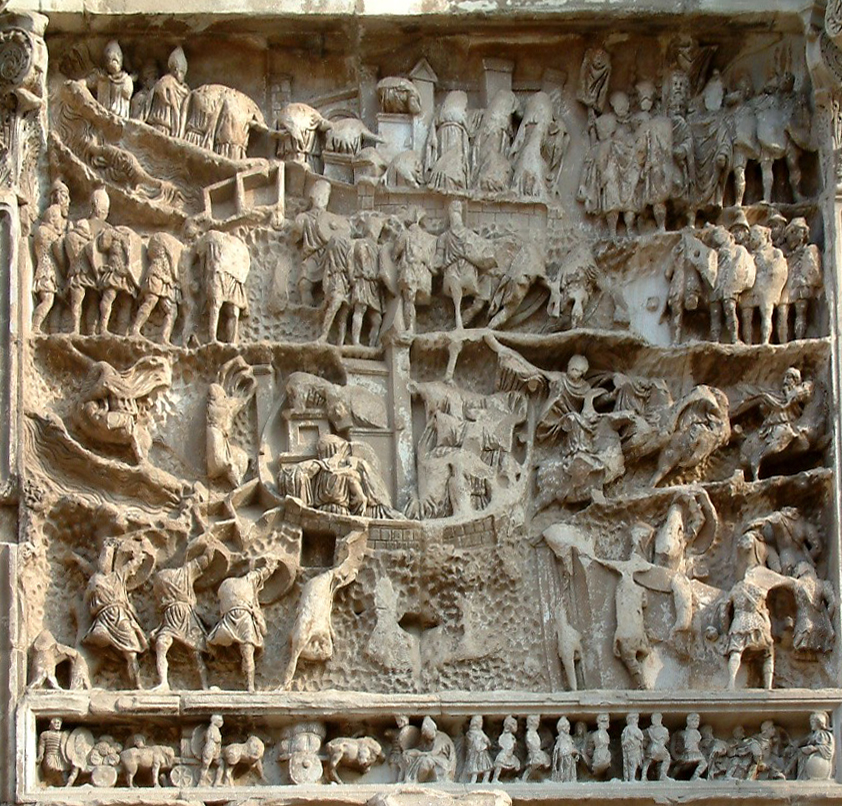
Reliefs depicting war with Parthia on the Arch of Septimius Severus, built to commemorate the Roman victories

War over Armenia broke out again in 161, when Vologases IV defeated the Romans there, captured Edessa and ravaged Syria. In 163 a Roman counter-attack under Statius Priscus defeated the Parthians in Armenia and installed a favored candidate on the Armenian throne. The following year Avidius Cassius invaded Mesopotamia, winning battles at Dura-Europos and Seleucia and sacking Ctesiphon in 165. An epidemic which was sweeping Parthia at the time, possibly of smallpox, spread to the Roman army and forced its withdrawal; this was the origin of the Antonine Plague that raged for a generation throughout the Roman Empire. In 195–197, a Roman offensive under the Emperor Septimius Severus led to Rome's acquisition of northern Mesopotamia as far as the areas around Nisibis, Singara and the third sacking of Ctesiphon. A final war against the Parthians was launched by the Emperor Caracalla, who sacked Arbela in 216. After his assassination, his successor, Macrinus, was defeated by the Parthians near Nisibis. In exchange for peace, he was obliged to pay for the damage caused by Caracalla.

== Roman–Sasanian wars ==
=== Early Roman–Sasanian conflicts ===
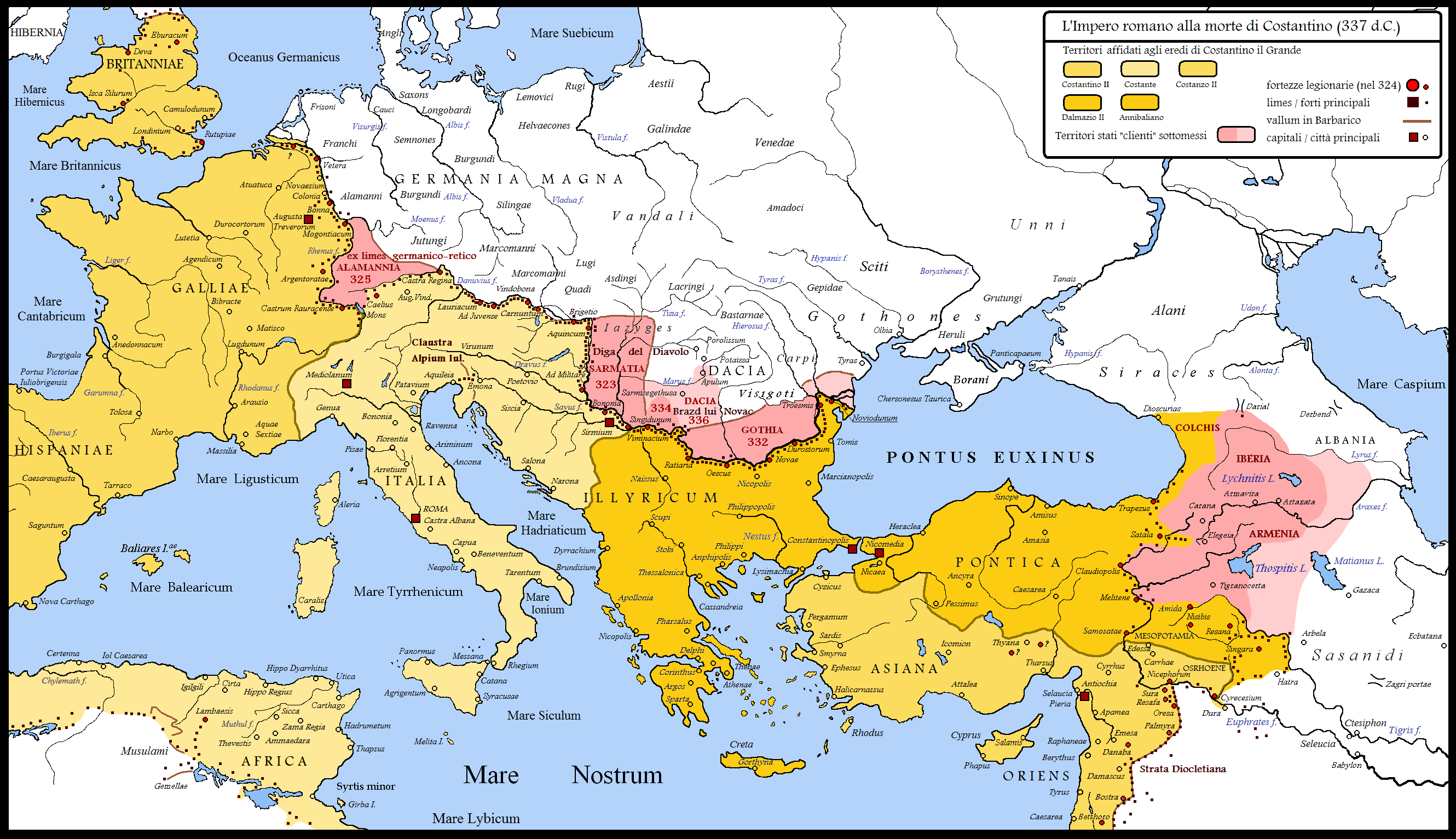
The northern and eastern frontiers of the Roman Empire in the time of Constantine the Great, with the territories acquired in the course of entire reign.

Conflict resumed shortly after the overthrow of Parthian rule and Ardashir I's foundation of the Sasanian Empire. Ardashir (r. 226–241) raided Mesopotamia and Syria in 230 and demanded the cession of all the former territories of the Achaemenid Empire. After fruitless negotiations, Alexander Severus set out against Ardashir in 232. One column of his army marched into Armenia, while two other columns operated in the south but failed and the campaign ended inconclusively. In 238–240, towards the end of his reign, Ardashir attacked again. More successful than during the earlier clash, the Persian forces took several cities in Syria and Mesopotamia, including Carrhae, Nisibis and Hatra.

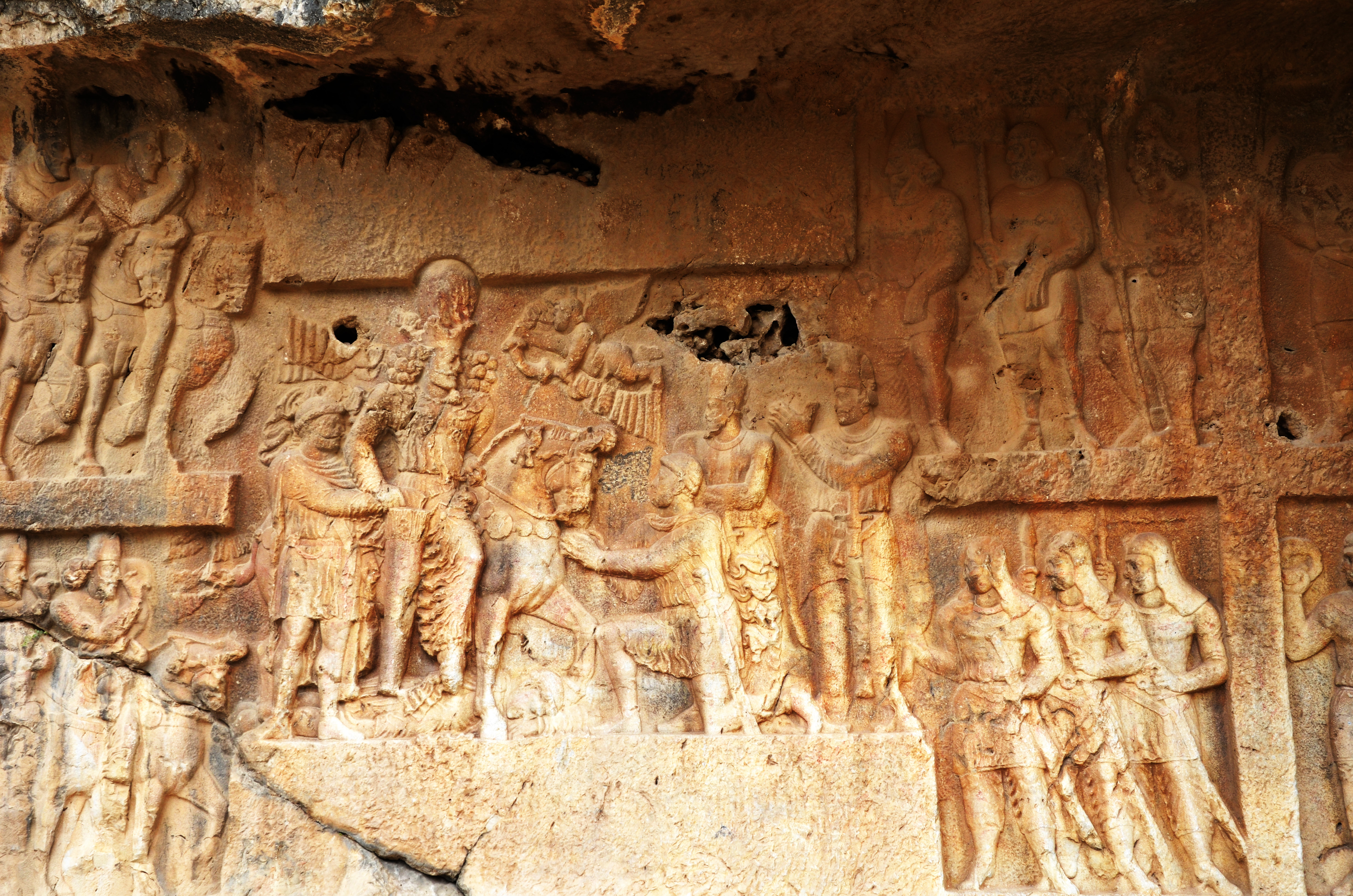
Bishapur Relief II commemorating Shapur I's victories on the Western front, depicting him on horseback with a captured Valerian, a dead Gordian III, and a kneeling emperor, either Philip the Arab or Uranius.

The struggle resumed and intensified under Ardashir's successor Shapur I; he invaded Mesopotamia and captured Hatra, a buffer state which had recently shifted its loyalty, but his forces were defeated at a battle near Resaena in 243; Carrhae and Nisibis were retaken by the Romans. Encouraged by this success, the emperor Gordian III advanced down the Euphrates but was defeated near Ctesiphon in the Battle of Misiche in 244. Gordian either died in the battle or was murdered by his own men; Philip became emperor, and paid 500,000 denarii to the Persians in a hastily negotiated peace settlement.

With the Roman Empire weakened by Germanic invasions and a series of short-term emperors, Shapur I soon resumed his attacks. In the early 250s, Philip was involved in a struggle over the control of Armenia; Shapur conquered Armenia and killed its king, defeated the Romans at the Battle of Barbalissos in 252, then probably took and plundered Antioch. Between 258 and 260, Shapur captured Emperor Valerian after defeating his army at the Battle of Edessa. He advanced into Anatolia but was defeated by Roman forces there; attacks from Odaenathus of Palmyra forced the Persians to withdraw from Roman territory, surrendering Cappadocia and Antioch. Between 262 and 264 CE, Odaenathus launched systematic campaigns into Persian territory, recovering the strategic cities of Nisibis, Edessa and Carrhae and the entirety of Roman Mesopotamia, possibly even besieging, but failing to take, Ctesiphon. Odaenathus's final campaign, which took place between 266 and 267 AD, may have further encroached upon the territory of the Sassanid Empire, perhaps even occupying Armenia.

In 275 and 282 Aurelian and Probus respectively planned to invade Persia, but they were both murdered before they were able to fulfil their plans. In 283, the emperor Carus launched an invasion of Persia, sacking its capital, Ctesiphon; he would probably have extended his campaign if the Emperor had not died in December of the same year. His successor Numerian was forced to retreat.

After a brief period of peace during Diocletian's early reign, Narseh renewed hostilities with the Romans, invading Armenia and defeating Galerius not far from Carrhae in 296 or 297. However, in 298, Galerius defeated Narseh at the Battle of Satala, sacked the capital Ctesiphon, and captured the Persian treasury and royal harem. The resulting peace settlement gave the Romans control of the area between the Tigris and the Greater Zab. The Roman victory was the most decisive for many decades: all the territories that had been lost, all the debatable lands, and control of Armenia lay in Roman hands. Many cities east of the Tigris were given to the Romans, including Tigranokert, Saird, Martyropolis, Balalesa, Moxos, Daudia, and Arzen. Also, control of Armenia was given to the Romans.

Julian's unsuccessful campaign in 363 resulted in the loss of the Roman territorial gains under the peace treaty of 299.

The arrangements of 299 lasted until the mid-330s, when Shapur II began a series of offensives against the Romans. Despite a long military operation, culminating in the Roman victory of Narasara (337) and the indecisive battle of Singara (348), his campaigns achieved little lasting effect: three Persian sieges of Nisibis, in that age known as the key to Mesopotamia, were repulsed, and while Shapur succeeded in 359 in successfully laying siege to Amida and taking Singara, both cities were soon regained by the Romans. Following a lull during the 350s while Shapur fought off nomad attacks on Persia's eastern and then northern frontiers, he launched a new campaign in 359 with the aid of the eastern tribes which he had meanwhile defeated, and after a difficult siege again captured Amida (359). In the following year he captured Bezabde and Singara, and repelled the counter-attack of Constantius II. But the enormous cost of these victories weakened him, and he was soon deserted by his barbarian allies, leaving him vulnerable to the major offensive in 363 by the Roman Emperor Julian, who advanced down the Euphrates to Ctesiphon with a major army. Despite a tactical victory at the Battle of Ctesiphon before the walls Julian was unable to take the Persian capital or advance any farther and retreated along the Tigris. Harried by the Persians, Julian was killed in the Battle of Samarra, during a difficult retreat along the Tigris. With the Roman army stuck on the eastern bank of the Euphrates, Julian's successor Jovian made peace, agreeing to major concessions in exchange for safe passage out of Sasanian territory. The Romans surrendered their former possessions east of the Tigris, as well as Nisibis and Singara, and Shapur soon conquered Armenia, abandoned by the Romans. Hostilities soon resumed in the Armeno-Sasanian War of 363–371, when Shapur II attempted to consolidate control over Armenia, resulting in the eventual intervention of Emperor Valens and the victory of the joint Roman-Armenian forces at Bagavan in 371. According to contemporary historians, the Sassanids had to cede much of the southern Caucasus and northern Mesopotamia to the Romans and their Armenian allies, largely neutralizing the gains made by Shapur II in 363. Afterwards, a seven-year truce was negotiated, which ensured relative peace on the border until 378/379, shortly before Shapur II's death.

In 383 or 384 Armenia again became a bone of contention between the Roman and the Sasanian empires, but hostilities did not occur. With both empires preoccupied by barbarian threats from the north, in 384 or 387, a definitive peace treaty was signed by Shapur III and Theodosius I dividing Armenia between the two states. Meanwhile, the northern territories of the Roman Empire were invaded by Germanic, Alanic, and Hunnic peoples, while Persia's northern borders were threatened first by a number of Hunnic peoples and then by the Hephthalites. With both empires preoccupied by these threats, a largely peaceful period followed, interrupted only by two brief wars, the first in 421–422 after Bahram V persecuted high-ranking Persian officials who had converted to Christianity, and the second in 440, when Yazdegerd II raided Roman Armenia.

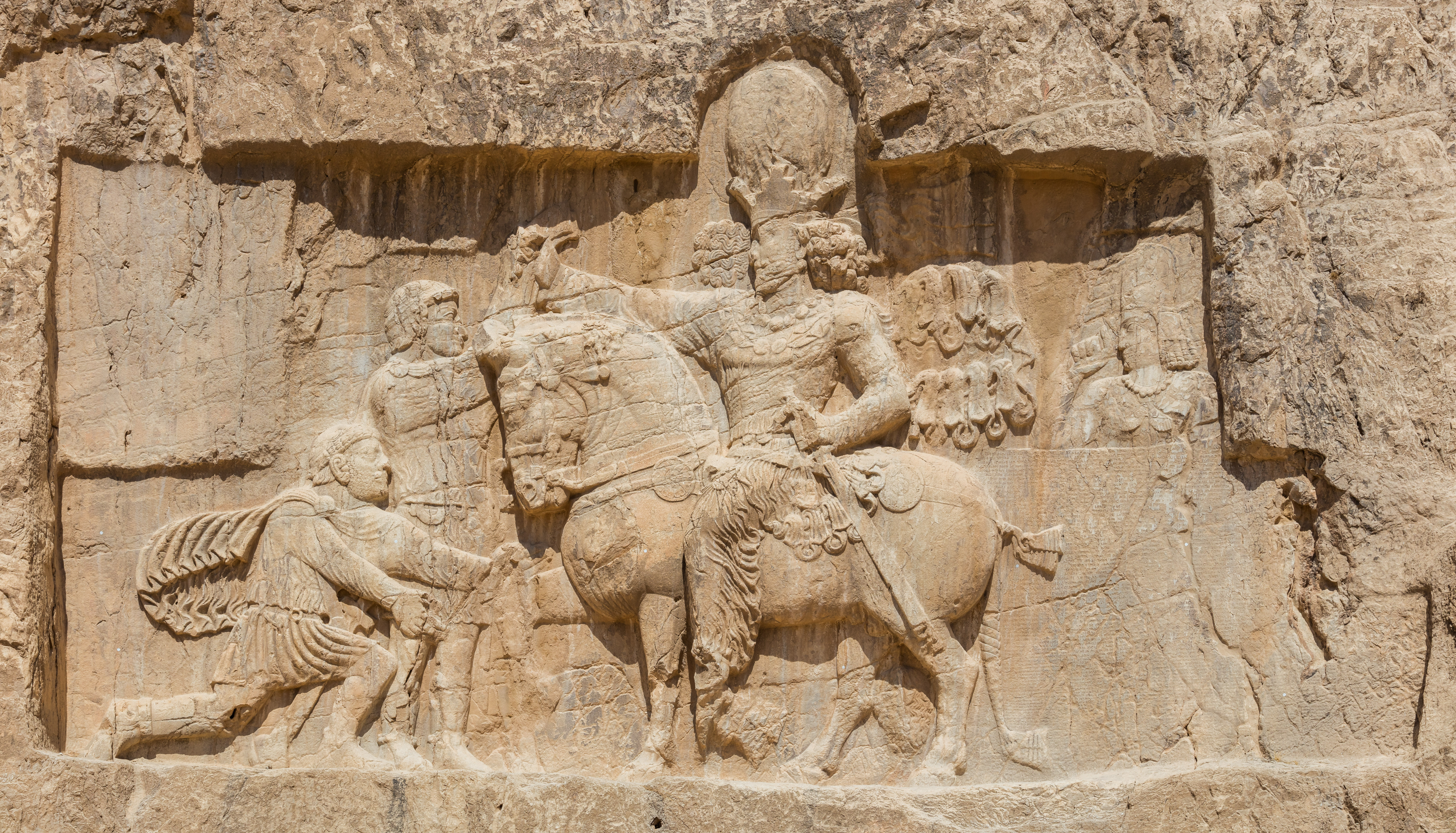
A rock-face relief at Naqsh-e Rostam, depicting the triumph of Shapur I over the Roman Emperor Valerian and Philip the Arab.

=== Byzantine–Sasanian wars ===
==== Anastasian War ====
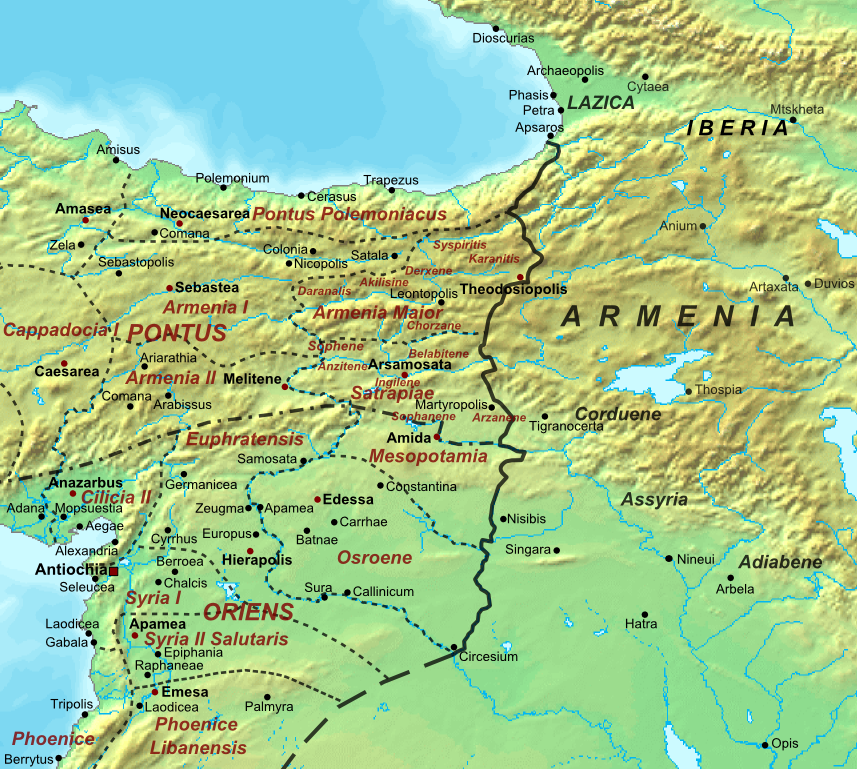
Map of the Roman–Persian frontier after the division of Armenia in 384. The frontier remained stable throughout the 5th century.

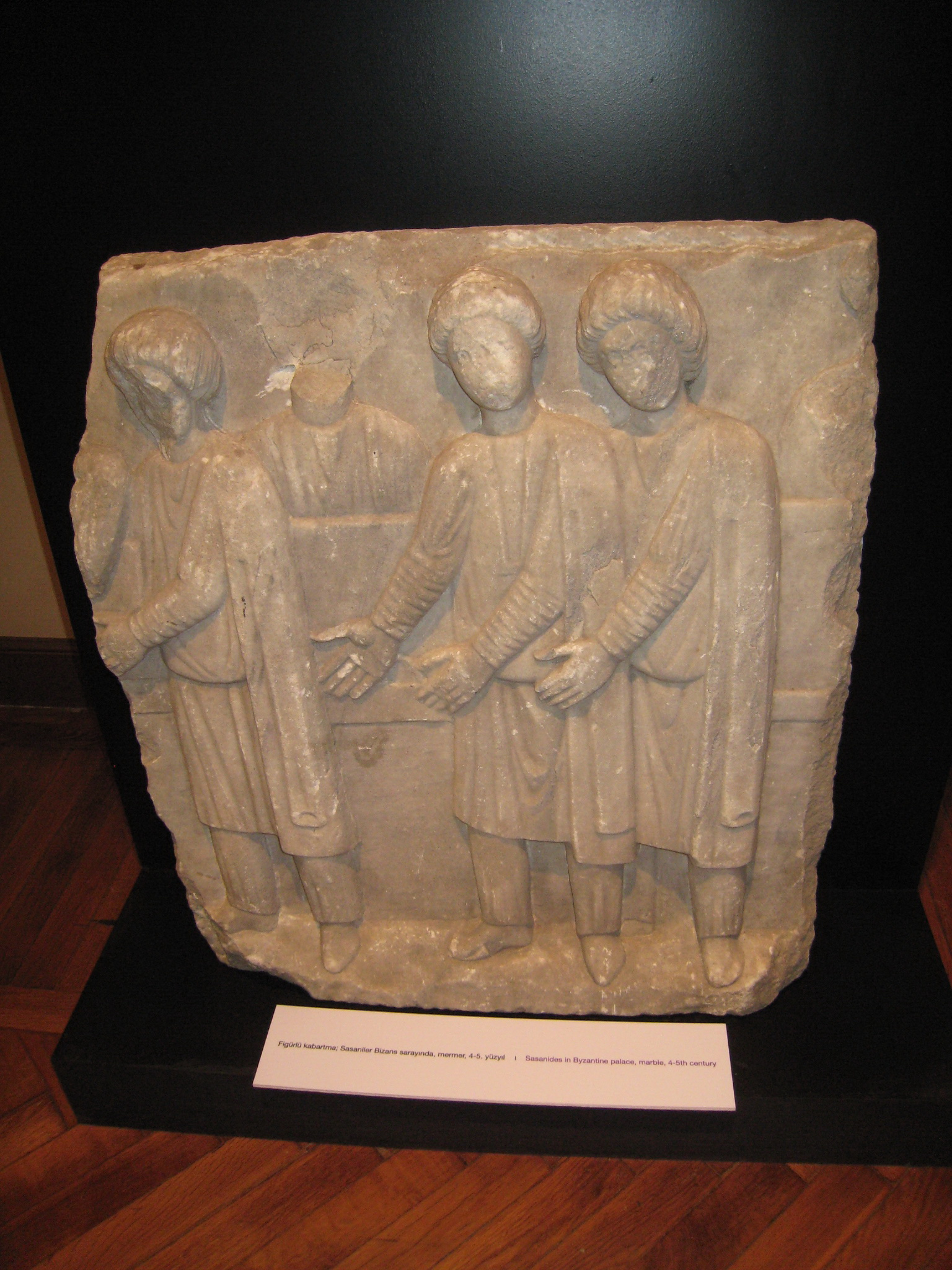
Relief of a Sasanian delegation in Byzantium, marble, 4th–5th century, Istanbul Archaeological Museums.

The Anastasian War ended the longest period of peace the two powers ever enjoyed. War broke out when the Persian King Kavadh I attempted to gain financial support by force from the Byzantine Emperor Anastasius I; the emperor refused to provide it and the Persian king tried to take it by force. In 502 AD, he quickly captured the unprepared city of Theodosiopolis and besieged the fortress-city of Amida through the autumn and winter (502–503). The siege of the fortress-city proved to be far more difficult than Kavadh expected; the defenders repelled the Persian assaults for three months before they were beaten. In 503, the Romans attempted an ultimately unsuccessful siege of the Persian-held Amida while Kavadh invaded Osroene and laid siege to Edessa with the same results.

Finally in 504, the Romans gained control through the renewed investment of Amida, which led to the fall of the city. That year an armistice was reached as a result of an invasion of Armenia by the Huns from the Caucasus. Although the two powers negotiated, it was not until November 506 that a treaty was agreed to. Negotiations between the two powers took place, but such was their distrust that in 506 the Romans, suspecting treachery, seized the Persian officials. Once released, the Persians preferred to stay in Nisibis. In November 506, a treaty was finally agreed upon, but little is known of what the terms of the treaty were. Procopius states that peace was agreed for seven years, and it is likely that some payments were made to the Persians.

In 505, Anastasius ordered the building of a great fortified city at Dara. At the same time, the dilapidated fortifications were also upgraded at Edessa, Batnae and Amida. Although no further large-scale conflict took place during Anastasius' reign, tensions continued, especially while work proceeded at Dara. This construction project was to become a key component of the Roman defenses, and also a lasting source of controversy with the Persians, who complained that it violated the treaty of 422, by which both empires had agreed not to establish new fortifications in the frontier zone. Anastasius pursued the project despite Persian objections, and the walls were completed by 507–508.

==== Iberian War ====
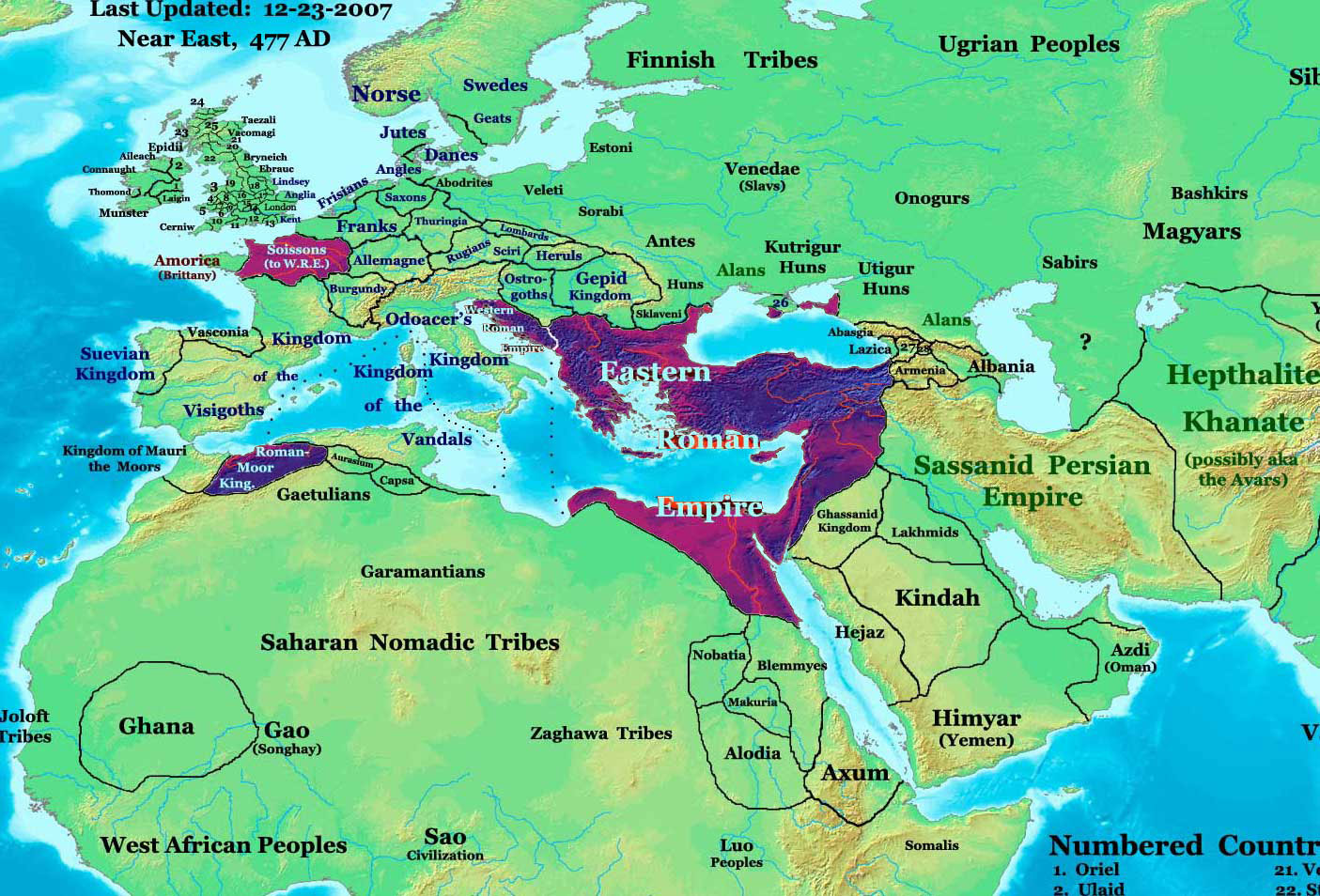
Roman and Persian empires, as well as their neighbors, in 477

In 524–525 AD, Kavadh proposed that Justin I adopt his son, Khosrau, but the negotiations soon broke down. The proposal was initially greeted with enthusiasm by the Roman emperor and his nephew, Justinian, but Justin's quaestor, Proculus, opposed the move, believing that Khosrau's adoption would give him, and by extension Persia, a claim to the Imperial throne. Tensions between the two powers were further heightened by the defection of the Iberian king Gourgen to the Romans: in 524/525 the Iberians rose in revolt against Persia, following the example of the neighboring Christian kingdom of Lazica, and the Romans recruited Huns from the north of the Caucasus to assist them. To start with, the two sides preferred to wage war by proxy, through Arab allies in the south and Huns in the north. Overt Roman–Persian fighting had broken out in the Transcaucasus region and upper Mesopotamia by 526–527. The early years of war favored the Persians: by 527, the Iberian revolt had been crushed, a Roman offensive against Nisibis and Thebetha in that year was unsuccessful, and forces trying to fortify Thannuris and Melabasa were prevented from doing so by Persian attacks. Attempting to remedy the deficiencies revealed by these Persian successes, the new Roman emperor, Justinian I, reorganized the eastern armies. In 528 Belisarius tried unsuccessfully to protect Roman workers in Thannuris, undertaking the construction of a fort right on the frontier. Damaging raids on Syria by the Lakhmids in 529 encouraged Justinian to strengthen his own Arab allies, helping the Ghassanid leader Al-Harith ibn Jabalah turn a loose coalition into a coherent kingdom.

In 530, a major Persian offensive in Mesopotamia was defeated by Roman forces under Belisarius at Dara, while a second Persian thrust in the Caucasus was defeated by Sittas at Satala. Belisarius was defeated by Persian and Lakhmid forces at the Battle of Callinicum in 531, which resulted in his dismissal. In the same year the Romans gained some forts in Armenia, while the Persians had captured two forts in eastern Lazica. Immediately after the Battle of Callinicum, unsuccessful negotiations between Justinian's envoy, Hermogenes, and Kavadh took place. A Persian siege of Martyropolis was interrupted by Kavadh I's death and the new Persian king, Khosrau I, re-opened talks in spring 532 and finally signed the Perpetual Peace in September 532, which lasted less than eight years. Both powers agreed to return all occupied territories, and the Romans agreed to make a one-time payment of 110 centenaria (11,000 lb of gold). The Romans recovered the Lazic forts, Iberia remained in Persian hands, and the Iberians who had left their country were given the choice of remaining in Roman territory or returning to their native land.

=== Lazic War ===
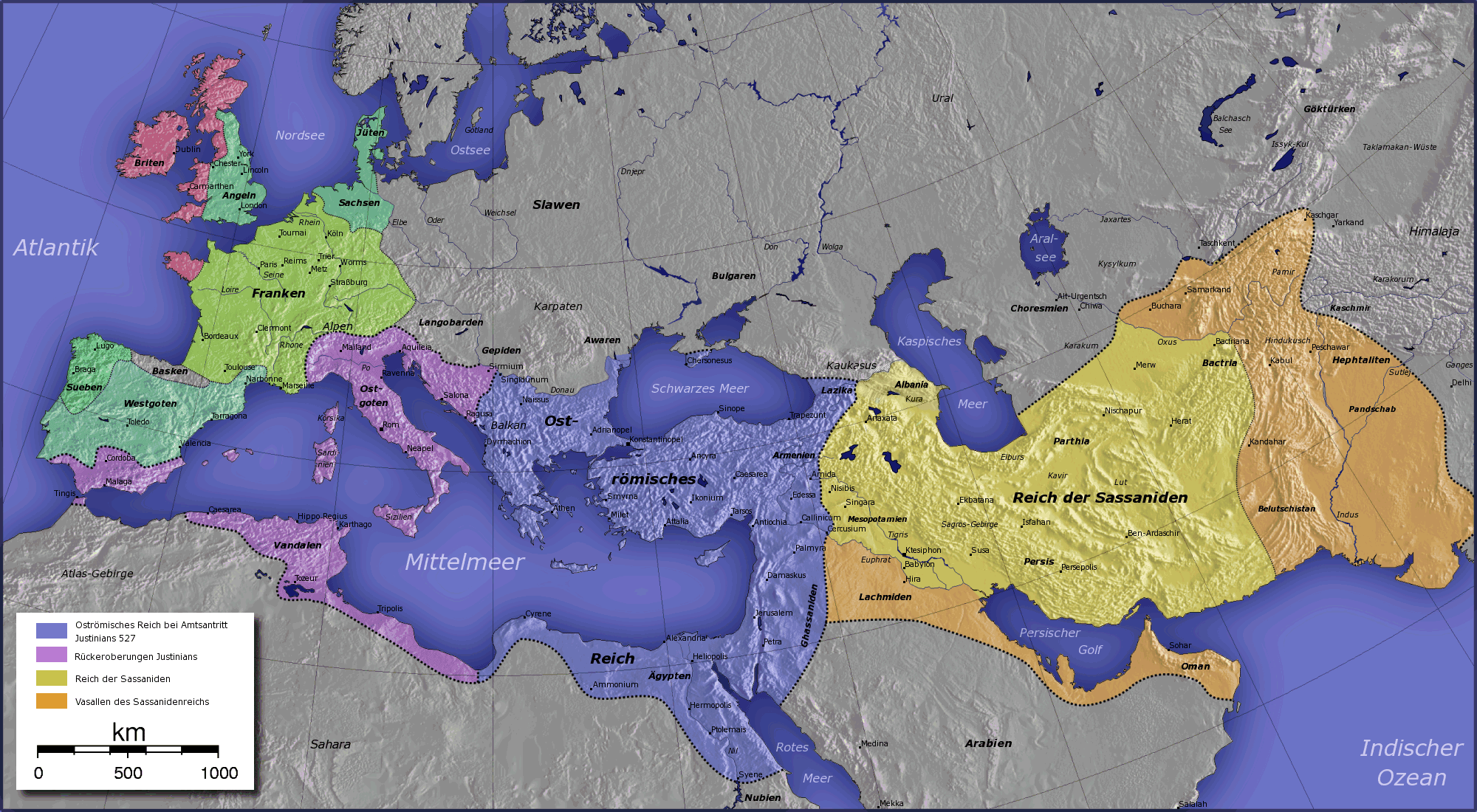
Roman and Sasanian Empires during Justinian's reign: Byzantine Empire Acquisitions by Justinian / Sasanian Empire Sasanian vassals

The Persians broke the "Treaty of Eternal Peace" in 540, probably in response to the Roman reconquest of much of the former western empire, which had been facilitated by the cessation of war in the East. Khosrau I invaded and devastated Syria, extorting large sums of money from the cities of Syria and Mesopotamia, and systematically looting other cities including Antioch, whose population was deported to Persian territory. The successful campaigns of Belisarius in the west encouraged the Persians to return to war, both taking advantage of Roman preoccupation elsewhere and seeking to check the expansion of Roman territory and resources. In 539 the resumption of hostilities was foreshadowed by a Lakhmid raid led by al-Mundhir IV, which was defeated by the Ghassanids under al-Harith ibn Jabalah. In 540, the Persians broke the "Treaty of Eternal Peace" and Khosrau I invaded Syria, destroying the city of Antioch and deporting its population to Weh Antiok Khosrow in Persia; as he withdrew, he extorted large sums of money from the cities of Syria and Mesopotamia and systematically looted the key cities. In 541 he invaded Lazica in the north. Belisarius was quickly recalled by Justinian to the East to deal with the Persian threat, while the Ostrogoths in Italy, who were in touch with the Persian King, launched a counter-attack under Totila. Belisarius took the field and waged an inconclusive campaign against Nisibis in 541. In the same year, Lazica switched its allegiance to Persia and Khosrau led an army to secure the kingdom. In 542 Khosrau launched another offensive in Mesopotamia and unsuccessfully attempted to capture Sergiopolis. He soon withdrew in the face of an army under Belisarius, en route sacking the city of Callinicum. Attacks on a number of Roman cities were repulsed and the Persian general Mihr-Mihroe was defeated and captured at Dara by John Troglita. An invasion of Armenia in 543 by the Roman forces in the East, numbering 30,000, against the capital of Persian Armenia, Dvin, was defeated by a meticulous ambush by a small Persian force at Anglon. Khosrau besieged Edessa in 544 without success and was eventually bought off by the defenders. The Edessenes paid five centenaria to Khosrau, and the Persians departed after nearly two months. In the wake of the Persian retreat, two Roman envoys, the newly appointed magister militum, Constantinus, and Sergius proceeded to Ctesiphon to arrange a truce with Khosrau. (The war dragged on under other generals and was to some extent hindered by the Plague of Justinian, because of which Khosrau temporarily withdrew from Roman territory) A five-year truce was agreed to in 545, secured by Roman payments to the Persians.

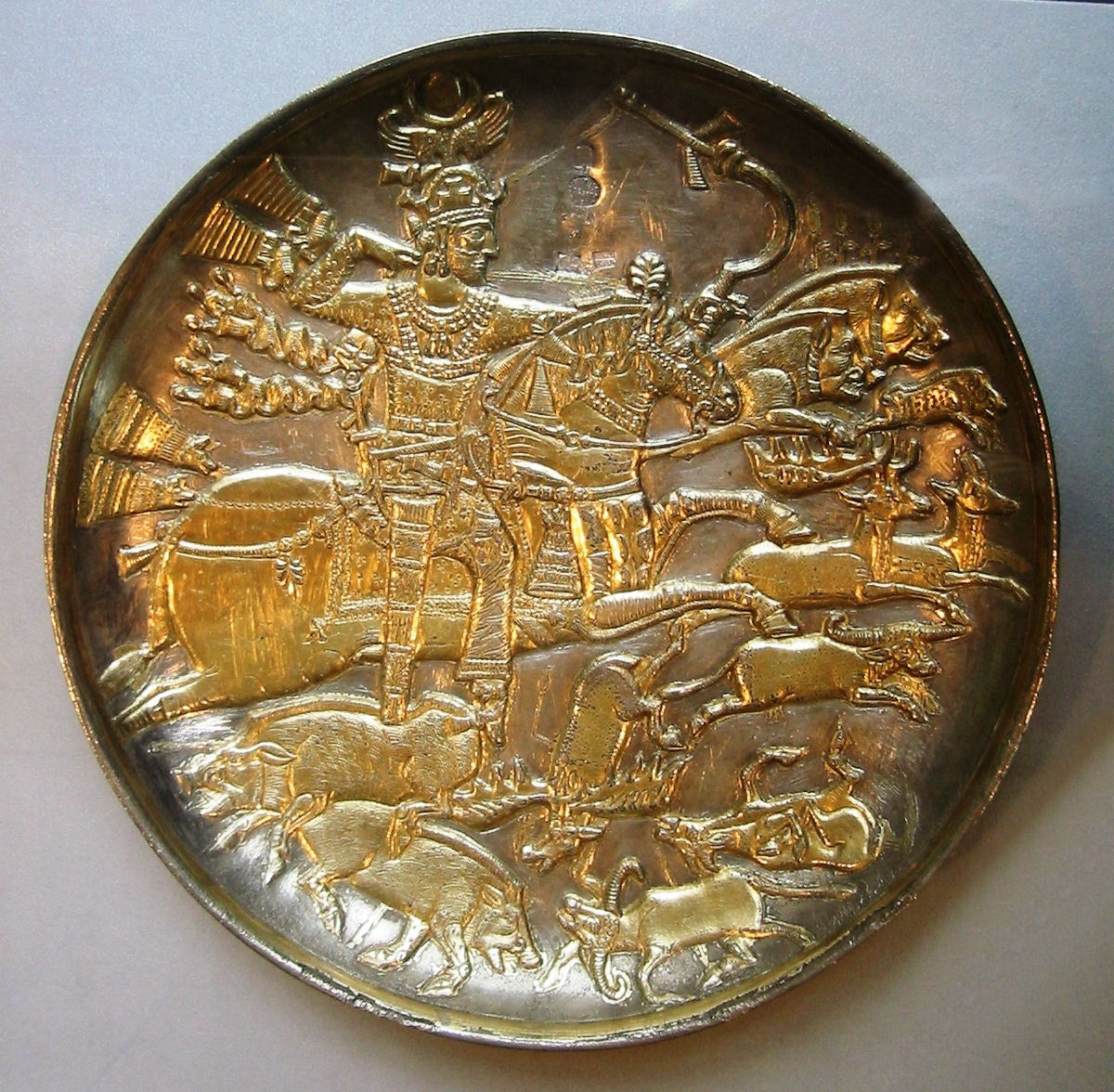
Hunting scene showing king Khosrau I (7th century Sasanian art, Cabinet des Medailles, Paris)

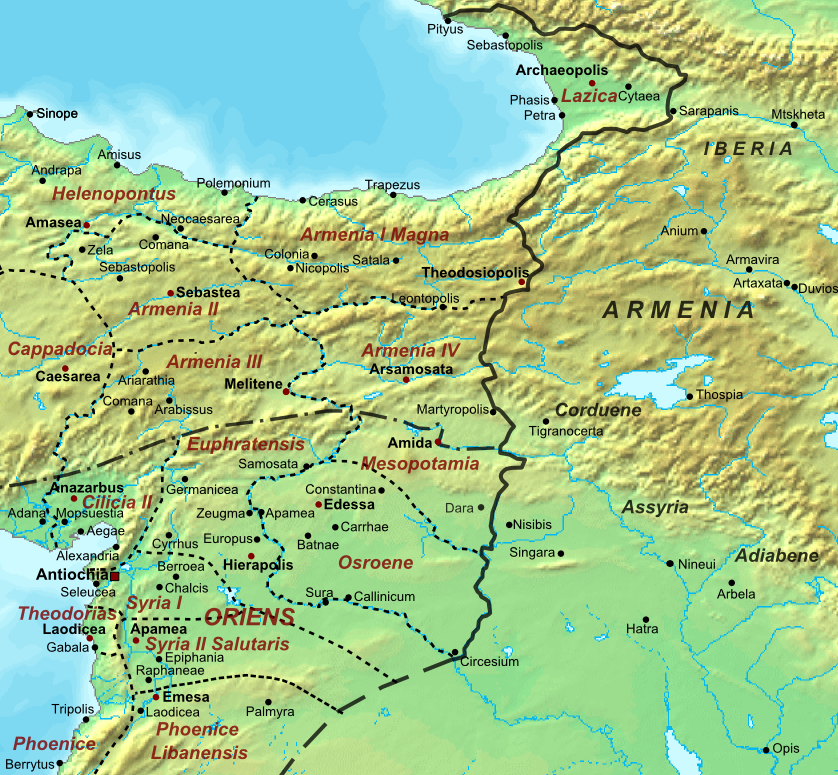
The Eastern Roman–Persian border at the time of Justinian's death in 565, with Lazica in Eastern Roman (Byzantine) hands

Early in 548, King Gubazes of Lazica, having found Persian protection oppressive, asked Justinian to restore the Roman protectorate. The emperor seized the chance, and in 548–549 combined Roman and Lazic forces with the magister militum of Armenia Dagistheus won a series of victories against Persian armies, although they failed to take the key garrison of Petra (present-day Tsikhisdziri). In 551, general Bessas who replaced Dagistheus put Abasgia and the rest of Lazica under control, and finally subjected Petra after fierce fighting, demolishing its fortifications. In the same year a Persian offensive led by Mihr-Mihroe occupied eastern Lazica. The truce that had been established in 545 was renewed outside Lazica for a further five years on condition that the Romans pay 2,000 lb of gold each year. The Romans failed to completely expel the Sasanians from Lazica; in 554, Mihr-Mihroe launched a new attack, dislodging a newly arrived Byzantine army from Telephis. In Lazica the war dragged on inconclusively for several years, with neither side able to make any major gains. Khosrau, who now had to deal with the White Huns, renewed the truce in 557, this time without excluding Lazica; negotiations continued for a definite peace treaty. Finally, in 562, the envoys of Justinian and Khosrau – Peter the Patrician and Izedh Gushnap – put together the Fifty-Year Peace Treaty. The Persians agreed to evacuate Lazica and received an annual subsidy of 30,000 nomismata (solidi). Both sides agreed not to build new fortifications near the frontier and to ease restrictions on diplomacy and trade.

=== War for the Caucasus ===
War broke again shortly after Armenia and Iberia revolted against Sasanian rule in 571, following clashes involving Roman and Persian proxies in Yemen (between the Axumites and the Himyarites) and the Syrian desert, and after Roman negotiations for an alliance with the Western Turkic Khaganate against Persia. Justin II brought Armenia under his protection, while Roman troops under Justin's cousin Marcian raided Arzanene and invaded Persian Mesopotamia, where they defeated local forces. Marcian's sudden dismissal and the arrival of troops under Khosrau resulted in a ravaging of Syria, the failure of the Roman siege of Nisibis and the fall of Dara. At a cost of 45,000 solidi, a one-year truce in Mesopotamia (eventually extended to five years) was arranged, but in the Caucasus and on the desert frontiers the war continued. In 575, Khosrau I attempted to combine aggression in Armenia with discussion of a permanent peace. He invaded Anatolia and sacked Sebasteia, but to take Theodosiopolis, and after a clash near Melitene the army suffered heavy losses while fleeing across the Euphrates under Roman attack and the Persian royal baggage was captured.

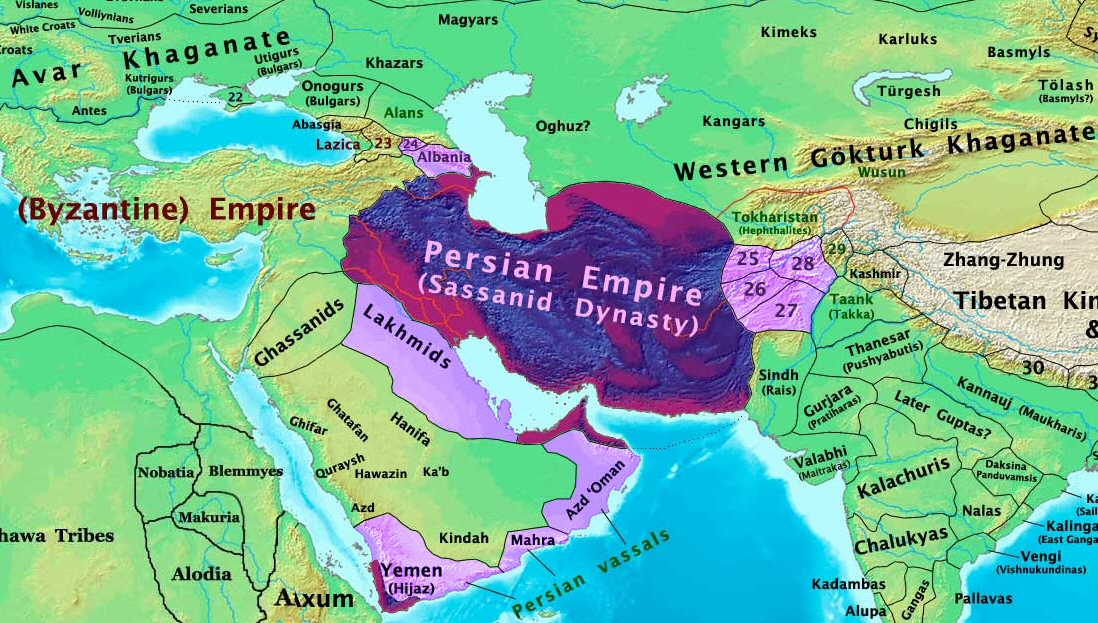
The Sasanian Empire and its neighbors (including the Eastern Roman Empire) in 600

The Romans exploited Persian disarray as general Justinian invaded deep into Persian territory and raided Atropatene. Khosrau sought peace but abandoned this initiative when Persian confidence revived after Tamkhusro won a victory in Armenia, where Roman actions had alienated local inhabitants. In the spring of 578 the war in Mesopotamia resumed with Persian raids on Roman territory. The Roman general Maurice retaliated by raiding Persian Mesopotamia, capturing the stronghold of Aphumon, and sacking Singara. Khosrau again opened peace negotiations but he died early in 579 and his successor Hormizd IV (r. 578–590) preferred to continue the war.

The Roman-Persian frontier in the 4th to 7th centuries

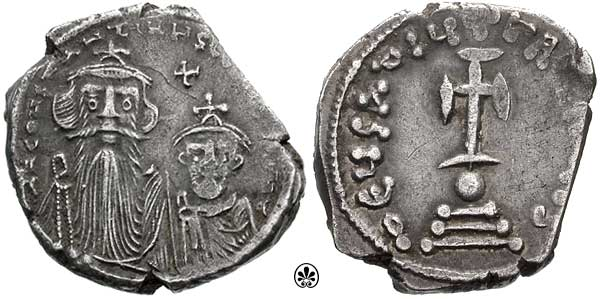
Late Roman silver coin showing the words Deus adiuta Romanis ("May God help the Romans")

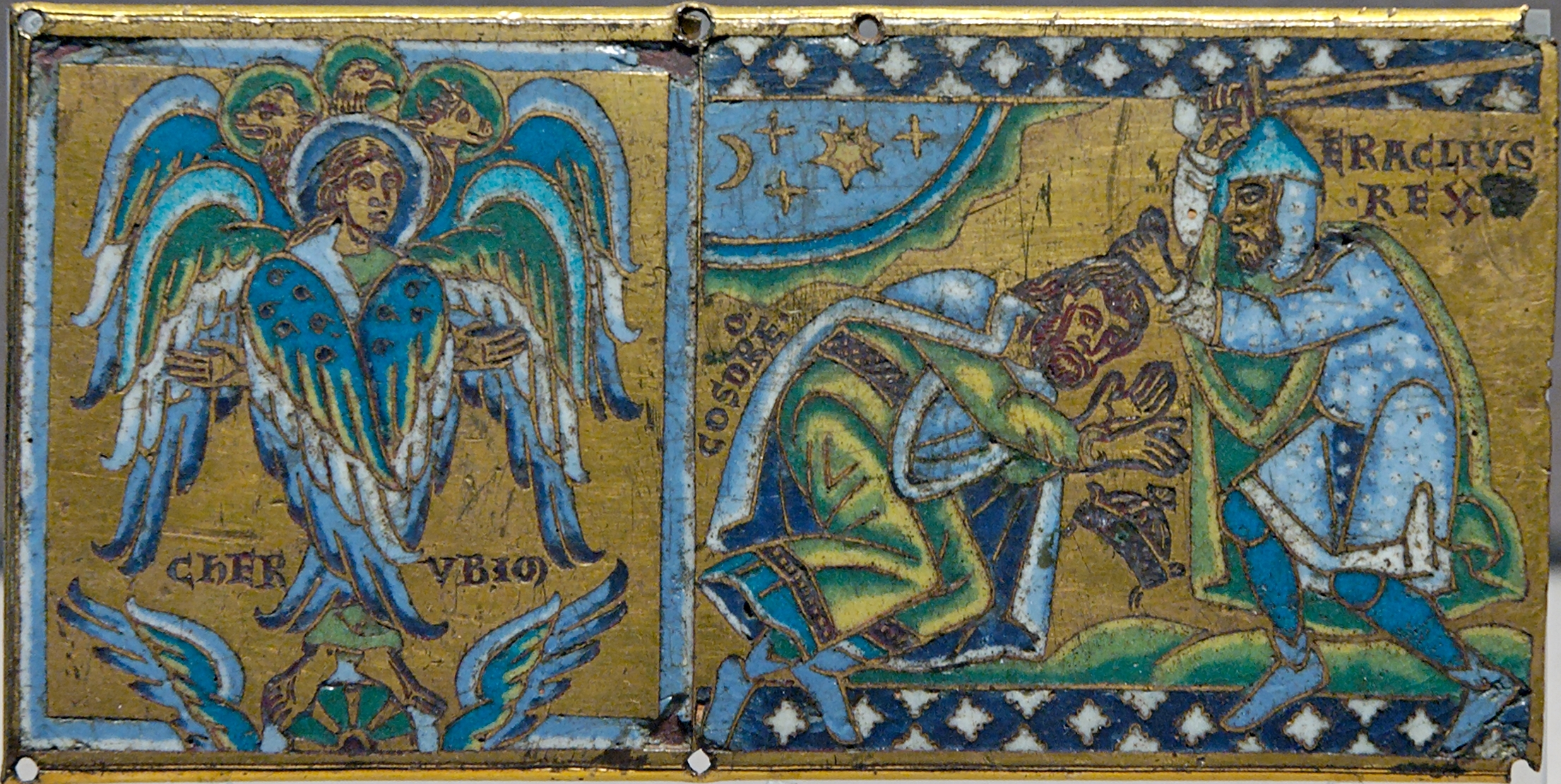
Cherub and Heraclius receiving the submission of Khosrau II; plaque from a cross (Champlevé enamel over gilt copper, 1160–1170, Paris, Louvre).

In 580, Hormizd IV abolished the Caucasian Iberian monarchy, and turned Iberia into a Persian province ruled by a marzpan (governor). During the 580s, the war continued inconclusively with victories on both sides. In 582, Maurice won a battle at Constantia over Adarmahan and Tamkhusro, who was killed, but the Roman general did not follow up his victory; he had to hurry to Constantinople to pursue his imperial ambitions. Another Roman victory at Solachon in 586 likewise failed to break the stalemate.

The Persians captured Martyropolis through treachery in 589, but that year the stalemate was shattered when the Persian general Bahram Chobin, having been dismissed and humiliated by Hormizd IV, raised a rebellion. Hormizd was overthrown in a palace coup in 590 and replaced by his son Khosrau II, but Bahram pressed on with his revolt regardless and the defeated Khosrau was soon forced to flee for safety to Roman territory, while Bahram took the throne as Bahram VI. With support from Maurice, Khosrau raised a rebellion against Bahram, and in 591 the combined forces of his supporters and the Romans defeated Bahram at the Battle of Blarathon and restored Khosrau II to power. In exchange for their help, Khosrau not only returned Dara and Martyropolis but also agreed to cede the western half of Iberia and more than half of Persian Armenia to the Romans.

=== Climax ===
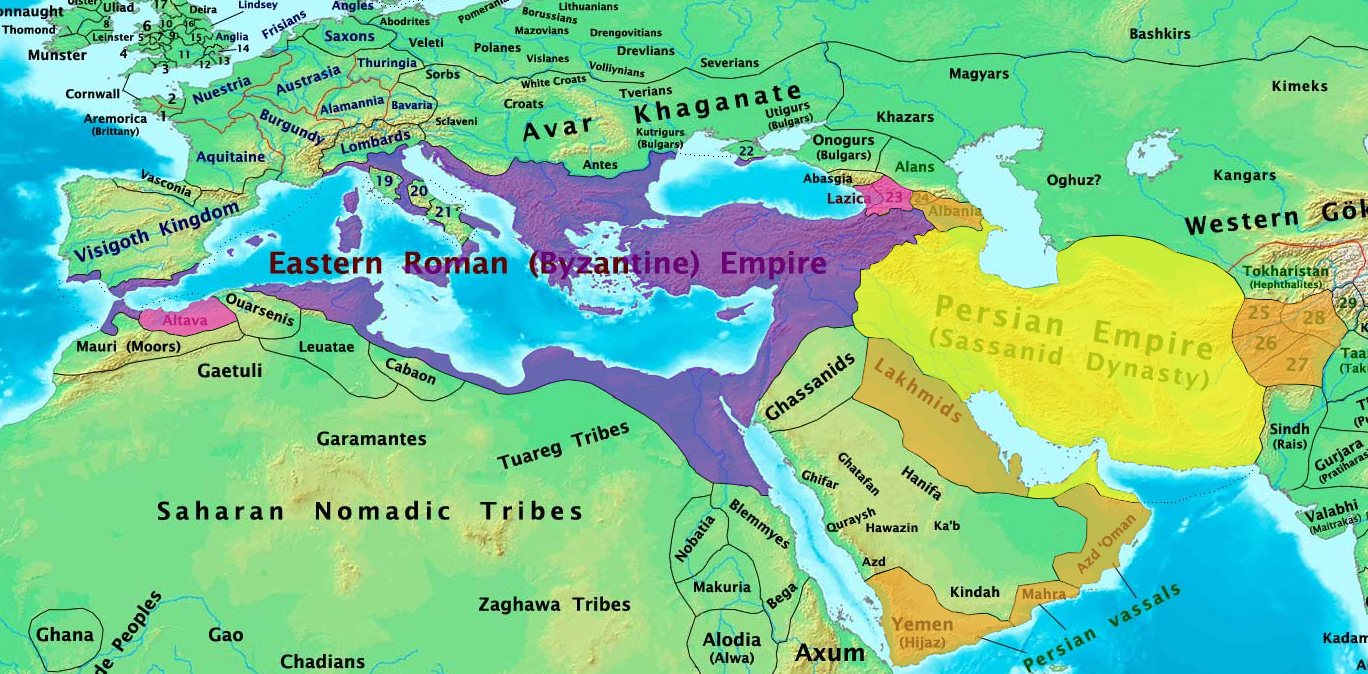
Byzantine and Sasanian Empires in 600

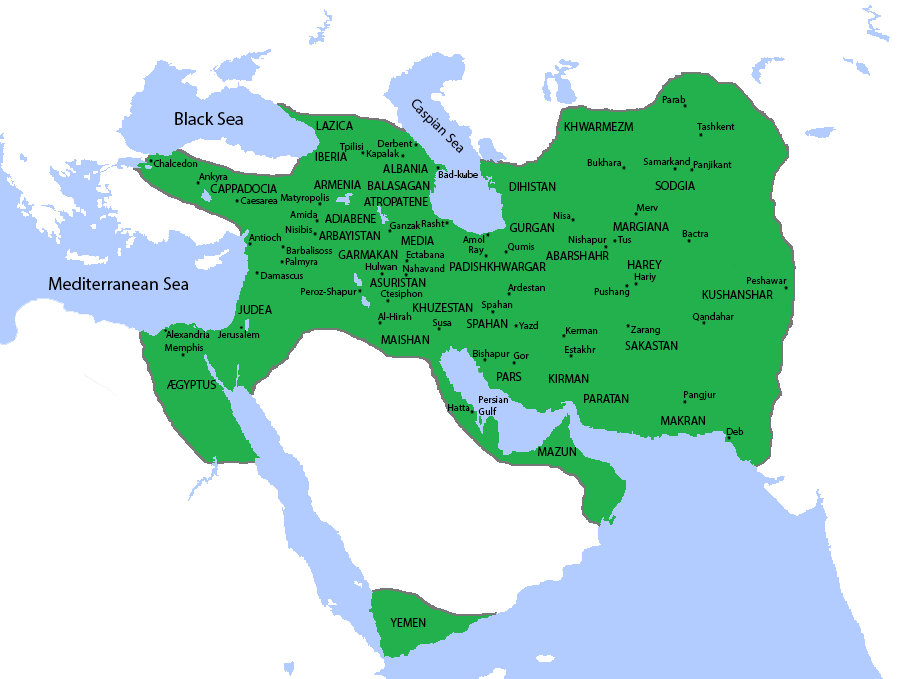
The Sasanian Empire at its greatest extent c. 620

In 602 the Roman army campaigning in the Balkans mutinied under the leadership of Phocas, who succeeded in seizing the throne and then killed Maurice and his family. Khosrau II used the murder of his benefactor as a pretext for war and reconquer the Roman province of Mesopotamia. In the early years of the war the Persians enjoyed overwhelming and unprecedented success. They were aided by Khosrau's use of a pretender claiming to be Maurice's son, and by the revolt against Phocas led by the Roman general Narses. In 603 Khosrau defeated and killed the Roman general Germanus in Mesopotamia and laid siege to Dara. Despite the arrival of Roman reinforcements from Europe, he won another victory in 604, while Dara fell after a nine-month siege. Over the following years the Persians gradually overcame the fortress cities of Mesopotamia by siege, one after another. At the same time they won a string of victories in Armenia and systematically subdued the Roman garrisons in the Caucasus.

Phocas' brutal repression sparked a succession crisis that ensued as the general Heraclius sent his nephew Nicetas to attack Egypt, enabling his younger son Heraclius to claim the throne in 610. Phocas, an unpopular ruler who is invariably described in Byzantine sources as a "tyrant", was eventually deposed by Heraclius, having sailed from Carthage. Around the same time, the Persians completed their conquest of Mesopotamia and the Caucasus, and in 611 they overran Syria and entered Anatolia, occupying Caesarea. Having expelled the Persians from Anatolia in 612, Heraclius launched a major counter-offensive in Syria in 613. He was decisively defeated outside Antioch by Shahrbaraz and Shahin, and the Roman position collapsed.

Over the following decade the Persians were able to conquer Palestine, Egypt, Rhodes and several other islands in the eastern Aegean, as well as to devastate Anatolia. Meanwhile, the Avars and Slavs took advantage of the situation to overrun the Balkans, bringing the Roman Empire to the brink of destruction.

During these years, Heraclius strove to rebuild his army, slashing non-military expenditures, devaluing the currency and melting down Church plate, with the backing of Patriarch Sergius, to raise the necessary funds to continue the war. In 622, Heraclius left Constantinople, entrusting the city to Sergius and general Bonus as regents of his son. He assembled his forces in Asia Minor and, after conducting exercises to revive their morale, he launched a new counter-offensive, which took on the character of a holy war. In the Caucasus he inflicted a defeat on an army led by a Persian-allied Arab chief and then won a victory over the Persians under Shahrbaraz. Following a lull in 623, while he negotiated a truce with the Avars, Heraclius resumed his campaigns in the East in 624 and routed an army led by Khosrau at Ganzak in Atropatene. In 625 he defeated the generals Shahrbaraz, Shahin and Shahraplakan in Armenia, and in a surprise attack that winter he stormed Shahrbaraz's headquarters and attacked his troops in their winter billets. Supported by a Persian army commanded by Shahrbaraz, together with the Avars and Slavs, the three unsuccessfully besieged Constantinople in 626, while a second Persian army under Shahin suffered another crushing defeat at the hands of Heraclius' brother Theodore.

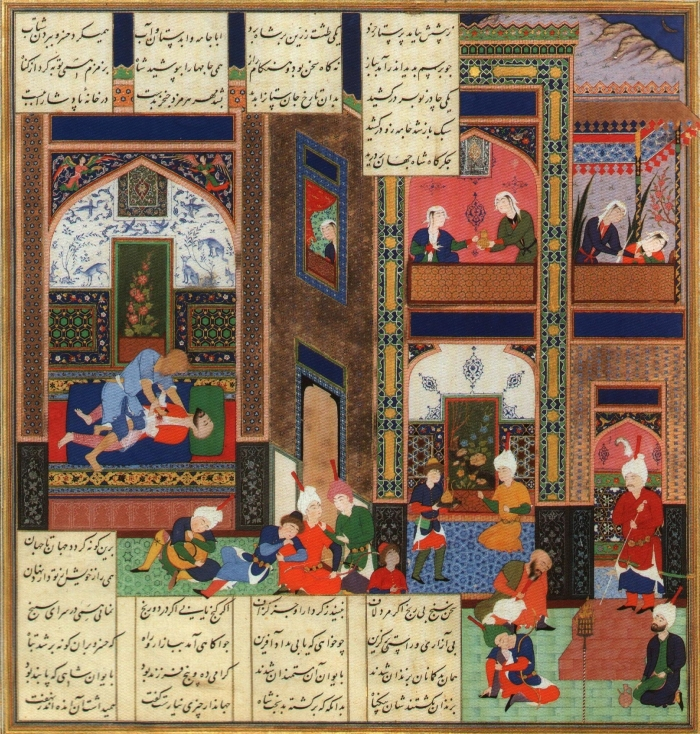
The assassination of Khosrau II, in a manuscript of the Shahnameh of Shah Tahmasp made by Abd al-Samad c. 1535. Persian poems are from Ferdowsi's Shahnameh.

Meanwhile, Heraclius formed an alliance with the Western Turkic Khaganate, who took advantage of the dwindling strength of the Persians to ravage their territories in the Caucasus. Late in 627, Heraclius launched a winter offensive into Mesopotamia, where, despite the desertion of the Turkish contingent that had accompanied him, he defeated the Persians at the Battle of Nineveh. Continuing south along the Tigris, he sacked Khosrau's great palace at Dastagird and was prevented from attacking Ctesiphon only by the destruction of the bridges on the Nahrawan Canal. Khosrau was overthrown and killed in a coup led by his son Kavadh II, who at once sued for peace, agreeing to withdraw from all occupied territories. Heraclius restored the True Cross to Jerusalem with a majestic ceremony in 629.

== Aftermath ==
Byzantine Empire (green) by 626 under Heraclius; striped areas are lands still threatened by the Sasanians.

Byzantine Empire (orange) by 650. By this point the Sasanian Empire had fallen to the Arab Muslim Caliphate as well as Byzantine Syria, Palestine and Egypt.

The devastating impact of this last war, added to the cumulative effects of a century of almost continuous conflict, left both empires crippled. When Kavadh II died only months after coming to the throne, Persia was plunged into several years of dynastic turmoil and civil war. The Sasanians were further weakened by economic decline, heavy taxation from Khosrau II's campaigns, religious unrest, and the increasing power of the provincial landholders. The Byzantine Empire was also severely affected, with its financial reserves exhausted by the war and the Balkans now largely in the hands of the Slavs. Additionally, Anatolia was devastated by repeated Persian invasions; the Empire's hold on its recently regained territories in the Caucasus, Syria, Mesopotamia, Palestine and Egypt was loosened by many years of Persian occupation.

Neither empire was given any chance to recover, as within a few years they were struck by the onslaught of the Arabs (newly united by Islam), which, according to Howard-Johnston, "can only be likened to a human tsunami". According to George Liska, the "unnecessarily prolonged Byzantine–Persian conflict opened the way for Islam". The Sasanian Empire rapidly succumbed to these attacks and was completely conquered. During the Byzantine–Arab wars, the exhausted Roman Empire's recently regained eastern and southern provinces of Syria, Armenia, Egypt and North Africa were also lost, reducing the Empire to a territorial rump consisting of Anatolia and a scatter of islands and footholds in the Balkans and Italy. These remaining lands were thoroughly impoverished by frequent attacks, marking the transition from classical urban civilization to a more rural, medieval form of society. However, unlike Persia, the Roman Empire ultimately survived the Arab assault, holding onto its residual territories and decisively repulsing two Arab sieges of its capital in 674–678 and 717–718. The Roman Empire also lost its territories in Crete and southern Italy to the Arabs in later conflicts, though these too were ultimately recovered.

== Strategies and military tactics ==
When the Roman and Parthian Empires first collided in the 1st century BC, it appeared that Parthia had the potential to push its frontier to the Aegean and the Mediterranean. However, the Romans repulsed the great invasion of Syria and Anatolia by Pacorus and Labienus, and were gradually able to take advantage of the weaknesses of the Parthian military system, which, according to George Rawlinson, was adapted for national defense but ill-suited for conquest. The Romans, on the other hand, were continually modifying and evolving their "grand strategy" from Trajan's time onwards, and were by the time of Pacorus able to take the offensive against the Parthians. Like the Sasanians in the late 3rd and 4th centuries, the Parthians generally avoided any sustained defense of Mesopotamia against the Romans. However, the Iranian plateau never fell, as the Roman expeditions had always exhausted their offensive impetus by the time they reached lower Mesopotamia, and their extended line of communications through territory not sufficiently pacified exposed them to revolts and counterattacks.

From the 4th century AD onwards, the Sasanians grew in strength and adopted the role of aggressor. They considered much of the land added to the Roman Empire in Parthian and early Sasanian times to rightfully belong to the Persian sphere. Everett Wheeler argues that "the Sassanids, administratively more centralized than the Parthians, formally organized defense of their territory, although they lacked a standing army until Khosrau I". In general, the Romans regarded the Sasanians as a more serious threat than the Parthians, while the Sasanians regarded the Roman Empire as the enemy par excellence. Proxy warfare was employed by both Byzantines and the Sasanians as an alternative to direct confrontation, particularly through Arab kingdoms in the south and nomadic nations in the north.

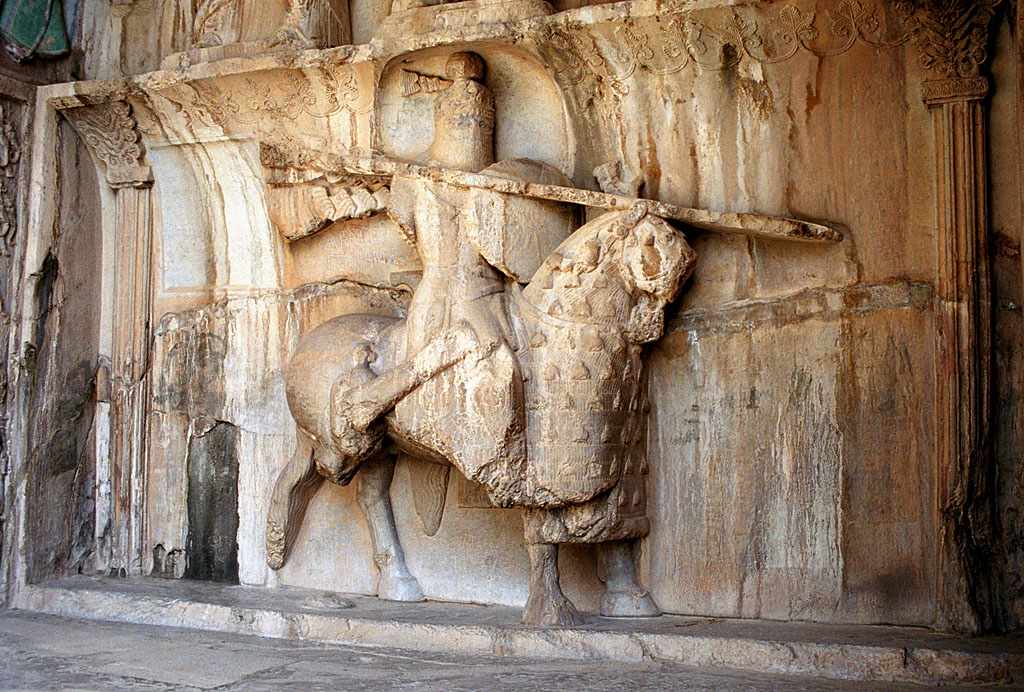
Statue of a Sasanian cavalryman in Taq-e Bostan, equipped with both lance and archery equipment. Both rider and horse are fully armored.

Militarily, the Sasanians continued the Parthians' heavy dependence on cavalry troops: a combination of horse-archers and cataphracts; the latter were heavy armored cavalry provided by the aristocracy. They added a contingent of war elephants obtained from the Indus Valley, but their infantry quality was inferior to that of the Romans. The combined forces of horse archers and heavy cavalry inflicted several defeats on the Roman foot-soldiers, including those led by Crassus in 53 BC, Mark Antony in 36 BC, and Valerian in 260 AD. The Parthian tactics gradually became the standard method of warfare in the Roman empire and cataphractarii and clibanarii units were introduced into the Roman army; as a result, heavily armed cavalry grew in importance in both the Roman and Persian armies after the 3rd century AD and until the end of the wars. The Roman army also gradually incorporated horse-archers (Equites Sagittarii), and by the 5th century AD they were no longer a mercenary unit, and were slightly superior individually in comparison to the Persian ones, as Procopius claims; however, the Persian horse-archer units as a whole always remained a challenge for the Romans, which suggests the Roman horse-archers were smaller in numbers. By the time of Khosrow I the composite cavalrymen (aswaran) appeared, who were skilled in both archery and the use of lance.

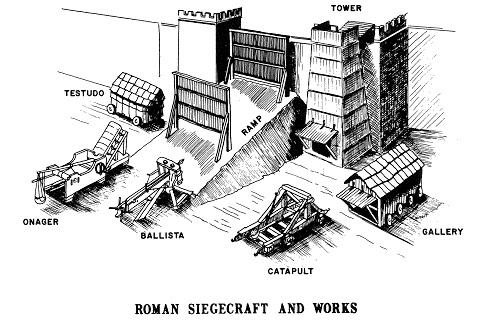
Roman siege engines

On the other hand, the Persians adopted war engines from the Romans. The Romans had achieved and maintained a high degree of sophistication in siege warfare and had developed a range of siege machines. On the other hand, the Parthians were inept at besieging; their cavalry armies were more suited to the hit-and-run tactics that destroyed Antony's siege train in 36 BC. The situation changed with the rise of the Sasanians, when Rome encountered an enemy equally capable in siege warfare. The Sasanians mainly used mounds, rams, mines, and to a lesser degree siege towers, artillery, and also chemical weapons, such as in Dura-Europos (256) and Petra (550–551). Use of complex torsion equipment was rare, since traditional Persian expertise in archery reduced their apparent benefits. Elephants were employed (e.g. as siege towers) where the terrain was unfavorable for machines. Recent assessments comparing the Sasanians and Parthians have reaffirmed the superiority of Sasanian siegecraft, military engineering, and organization, as well as ability to build defensive works.

By the beginning of Sasanian rule, a number of buffer states existed between the empires. These were absorbed by the central state over time, and by the 7th century the last buffer state, the Arab Lakhmids, was annexed to the Sasanian Empire. Frye notes that in the 3rd century AD such client states played an important role in Roman–Sasanian relations, but both empires gradually replaced them by an organized defense system run by the central government and based on a line of fortifications (the limes) and the fortified frontier cities, such as Dara. Towards the end of the 1st century AD, Rome organized the protection of its eastern frontiers through the limes system, which lasted until the Muslim conquests of the 7th century after improvements by Diocletian. Like the Romans, the Sasanians constructed defensive walls opposite the territory of their opponents. According to R. N. Frye, it was under Shapur II that the Persian system was extended, probably in imitation of Diocletian's construction of the limes of the Syrian and Mesopotamian frontiers of the Roman Empire. The Roman and Persian border units were known as limitanei and marzobans, respectively.

The Sasanians, and to a lesser extent the Parthians, practiced mass deportations to new cities as a tool of policy, not just the prisoners-of-war (such as those of the Battle of Edessa), but also the cities they captured, such as the deportation of the Antioch's people to Weh Antiok Khosrow, which led to the decline of the former. These deportations also initiated the spread of Christianity in Persia.

The Persians seem to have been reluctant to resort to naval action. There was some minor Sasanian naval action in 620–23, and the only major Byzantine navy's action was during the Siege of Constantinople (626).

== Assessments ==
The Roman–Persian wars have been characterized as "futile" and too "depressing and tedious to contemplate". Prophetically, Cassius Dio noted their "never-ending cycle of armed confrontations" and observed that "it is shown by the facts themselves that [Severus'] conquest has been a source of constant wars and great expense to us. For it yields very little and uses up vast sums; and now that we have reached out to peoples who are neighbor of the Medes and the Parthians rather than of ourselves, we are always, one might say, fighting the battles of those peoples." In the long series of wars between the two powers, the frontier in upper Mesopotamia remained more or less constant. Historians point out that the stability of the frontier over the centuries is remarkable, although Nisibis, Singara, Dara and other cities of upper Mesopotamia changed hands from time to time, and the possession of these frontier cities gave one empire a trade advantage over the other. As Frye states:

One has the impression that the blood spilled in the warfare between the two states brought as little real gain to one side or the other as the few meters of land gained at terrible cost in the trench warfare of the First World War.

"How could it be a good thing to hand over one's dearest possessions to a stranger, a barbarian, the ruler of one's bitterest enemy, one whose good faith and sense of justice were untried, and, what is more, one who belonged to an alien and heathen faith?"
Agathias (Histories, 4.26.6, translated by Averil Cameron) about the Persians, a judgment typical of the Roman view.

Both sides attempted to justify their respective military goals in both active and reactive ways. According to the Letter of Tansar and the Muslim writer Al-Tha'alibi, Ardashir I's and Pacorus I's invasions, respectively, of Roman territories, were to avenge Alexander the Great's conquest of Persia, which was thought to be the cause of the subsequent Iranian disarray; this is matched by the notion imitatio Alexandri cherished by the Roman emperors Caracalla, Alexander Severus, and Julian. Roman sources reveal long-standing prejudices with regard to the Eastern powers' customs, religious structures, languages, and forms of government. John F. Haldon underscores that "although the conflicts between Persia and East Rome revolved around issues of strategic control around the eastern frontier, yet there was always a religious-ideological element present". From the time of Constantine on, Roman emperors appointed themselves as the protectors of Christians of Persia. This attitude created intense suspicions of the loyalties of Christians living in Sasanian Iran and often led to Roman–Persian tensions or even military confrontations (e.g. in 421–422). A characteristic of the final phase of the conflict, when what had begun in 611–612 as a raid was soon transformed into a war of conquest, was the pre-eminence of the Cross as a symbol of imperial victory and of the strong religious element in the Roman imperial propaganda; Heraclius himself cast Khosrau as the enemy of God, and authors of the 6th and 7th centuries were fiercely hostile to Persia.

== Historiography ==
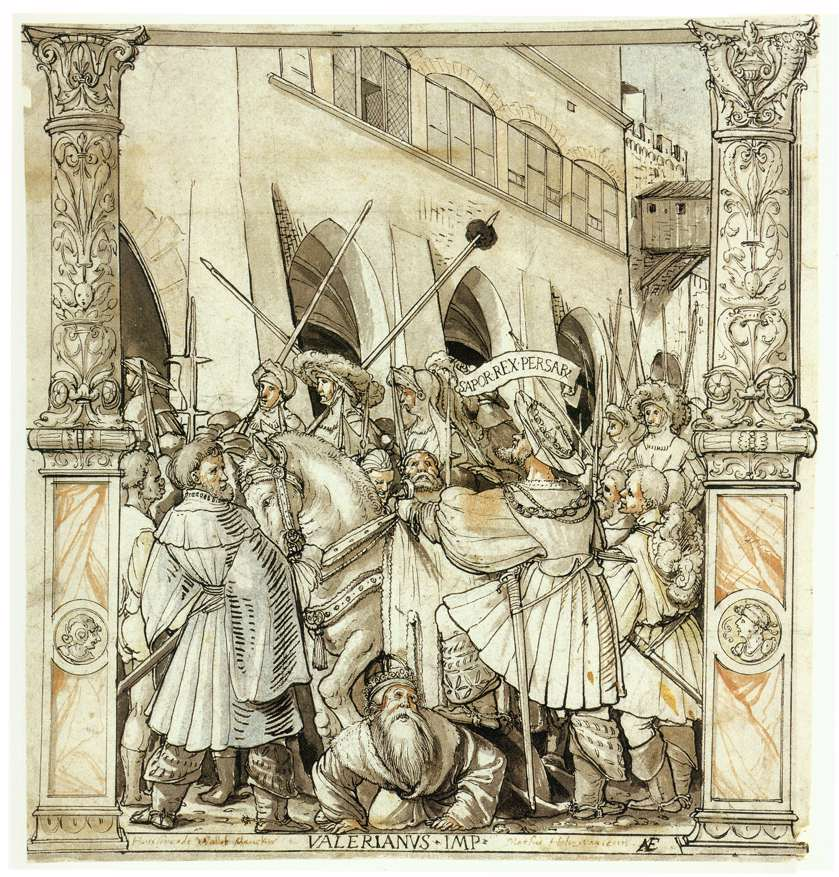
The Humiliation of Valerian by Shapur (Hans Holbein the Younger, 1521, pen and black ink on a chalk sketch, Kunstmuseum Basel)

The sources for the history of Parthia and the wars with Rome are scant and scattered. The Parthians followed the Achaemenid tradition and favored oral historiography, which assured the corruption of their history once they had been vanquished. The main sources of this period are thus Roman (Tacitus, Marius Maximus, and Justin) and Greek historians (Herodian, Cassius Dio and Plutarch). The 13th book of the Sibylline Oracles narrates the effects of the Roman–Persian wars in Syria from the reign of Gordian III to the domination of the province by Odaenathus of Palmyra. With the end of Herodian's record, all contemporary chronological narratives of Roman history are lost, until the narratives of Lactantius and Eusebius at the beginning of the 4th century, both from a Christian perspective.

The principal sources for the early Sasanian period are not contemporary. Among them the most important are the Greeks Agathias and Malalas, the Persian Muslims al-Tabari and Ferdowsi, the Armenian Agathangelos, and the Syriac Chronicles of Edessa and Arbela, most of whom depended on late Sasanian sources, especially Khwaday-Namag. The Augustan History is neither contemporary nor reliable, but it is the chief narrative source for Severus and Carus. The trilingual (Middle Persian, Parthian, Greek) inscriptions of Shapur are primary sources. These were isolated attempts at approaching written historiography however, and by the end of the 4th century AD, even the practice of carving rock reliefs and leaving short inscriptions was abandoned by the Sasanians.

For the period between 353 and 378, there is an eyewitness source to the main events on the eastern frontier in the Res Gestae of Ammianus Marcellinus. For the events covering the period between the 4th and the 6th century, the works of Sozomenus, Zosimus, Priscus, and Zonaras are especially valuable. The single most important source for Justinian's Persian wars up to 553 is Procopius. His continuators Agathias and Menander Protector offer many important details as well. Theophylact Simocatta is the main source for the reign of Maurice, while Theophanes, Chronicon Paschale and the poems of George of Pisidia are useful sources for the last Roman–Persian war. In addition to Byzantine sources, two Armenian historians, Sebeos and Movses, contribute to the coherent narrative of Heraclius' war and are regarded by Howard-Johnston as "the most important of extant non-Muslim sources".
