= Amr ibn Hind =

Lakhmid Arab king from 554 to 569

Amr III ibn al-Mundhir
- King of the Lakhmid state
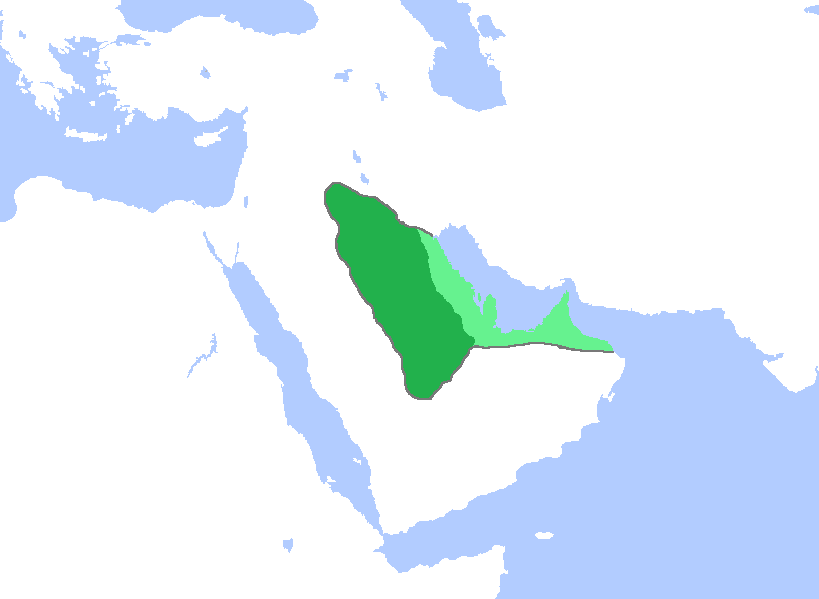
- Reign: CE 554–569
- Predecessor: Al-Mundhir III
- Successor: Qabus ibn al-Mundhir
- Died: c. 569; Najd, Lakhmid kingdom
- House: Lakhmids
- Father: Al-Mundhir III
- Mother: Hind bint al-Harith ibn Amr ibn Hujr Akil al-Murar
- Religion: Nestorian Christianity

Amr III ibn al-Mundhir (Arabic: عمرو بن المنذر, romanized: ʿAmr ibn al-Mundhir; Greek: Ἄμβρος ὁ [υἱός τοῦ] Ἀλαμουνδάρου), more commonly known by the matronymic Amr ibn Hind (Arabic: عمرو بن هند, ʿAmr ibn Hind), was the king of the Lakhmid Arabs in 554–569/570. He was a client of the Sasanian Empire. In around 550 AD he clashed with Aksumite Empire over southern Arabia and was instrumental in the downfall of Aksumite power in southern Arabia. He was famous for his bellicosity and his patronage of poets. He was killed over an insult to Amru ibn kulthum's mother the chief of the taghlib tribe.

== Life ==
He was the son of the Lakhmid king al-Mundhir III ibn al-Nu'man (r. 502–554), and succeeded to the throne upon his father's death in 554. His mother was the Kindite princess Hind bint al-Harith ibn Amr ibn Hujr Akil al-Murar; unusually, Amr is most often referred to with the matronymic "ibn Hind" in Arabic literature, rather than the patronymic "ibn al-Mundhir". He was appointed to rule over the Ma'add tribal confederation in central Arabia by his father. In c. 550/552, Amr clashed with the forces of the Aksumite viceroy Abraha and was defeated at the battle of Haliban or Huluban (west of modern Riyadh) and forced to give up hostages.

=== Reign ===
After succeeding his father as king of the Lakhmids, in his capacity as the client and proxy of the Sasanian Empire he was engaged in several wars against the other powerful tribal groups of northeastern Arabia, such as the Bakr, Taghlib, and Tamim.

The medieval historian Yaqut al-Hamawi indicates that Amr's full brother Qabus, and another brother by the same mother (possibly al-Mundhir IV), were associated as junior rulers already during Amr's rule. On the other hand, his namesake half-brother, Amr ibn Umama, was explicitly excluded. Ibn Umama tried to secure the assistance of the Yemeni ruler to claim his rights, only to be murdered by one of his companions.

Amr himself was likely a Christian, although perhaps not openly so, since the religion was distrusted by his Sasanian overlords as it was associated with their main rival, the Byzantine Empire. During the negotiations for the peace treaty of 561 ending the war between the Sasanian Persians and the Byzantines, Amr demanded the payment of gold subsidies by the Byzantines, as had been the practice under his father, but this demand was rejected by the Byzantine negotiator, Peter the Patrician. As a result, Amr broke the peace by launching raids against his pro-Byzantine counterpart, the Ghassanid king al-Harith ibn Jabalah (r. 528–569). Al-Harith complained about these during this 563 visit to Constantinople, but pointedly remarked that he did not deem it necessary to retaliate so as not to disturb the peace. Amr repeated his demands in 567 via a Persian embassy to Constantinople, but was again rebuffed. In return, he ordered his brother Qabus to raid the Ghassanid territories. According to Shahîd, it appears that at that time, the Byzantine government tacitly consented to give the Lakhmids the desired subsidies to maintain the peace between Byzantium and Persia.

Some time after that he received the Yemeni magnate Sayf ibn Dhi Yazan, whose family dominated the Hadramawt, and who had come to ask for Sasanian aid in overthrowing Aksumite rule over Yemen. according to the narratives included in the history of al-Tabari, Amr took him with him to an audience with the Sasanian ruler, Khosrau I, who was indeed persuaded to send an expedition to Yemen which quickly conquered the country.

He was killed while dining by the chief Amr ibn Kulthum in 569 or 570, after the Lakhmid ruler's mother had insulted Kulthum's mother at court. He was succeeded by his brother Qabus.

=== Character ===
The Arabic sources highlight Amr's energy and warlike nature, but also his cruelty, which was legendary: according to a well-known story, he sent the poets al-Mutalammis and Tarafa to the governor of Bahrayn bearing sealed letters with orders for their execution. Al-Mutalammis was suspicious enough to destroy his letter, but Tarafa delivered his, and was executed. The "letter of al-Mutalammis" became the proverbial example of this device in Arab lore.

Amr's difficult character earned him the nickname Muḍarriṭ al-Ḥijāra ("the one who makes stones emit sounds"), as well as Muḥarriq ("the burner"). The latter nickname is connected to a tradition reporting that he ordered a hundred members of the Tamimi subtribe of Darim burned alive. Alternatively, it is attributed to his burning the date palms of al-Jamama. The historian Gustav Rothstein notes that it is more likely that these stories are later inventions, designed to explain Amr's nickname, rather than its origin. Rothstein points out that Muharriq was a common name among the Lakhmids, and the name of a local pre-Islamic deity, so that it may simply reflect a dedication of Amr in his childhood to this cult.

== Cultural legacy ==
Amr's court was renowned in Arab history for the number of poets it attracted, including Kulthum, Tarafa, al-Harith ibn Hilliza, al-Mutalammis, al-Muthaqqib al-Abdi, al-Munakhal al-Yashkuri, Suwayd ibn Khadhdhaq and Yazid ibn Khadhdhaq. Amr himself was also the cousin of the greatest pre-Islamic Arab poet, Imru al-Qays.

== Sources ==
- Bosworth, C. E. (1983). "Iran and the Arabs Before Islam". In Yarshater, Ehsan (ed.). The Cambridge History of Iran: The Seleucid, Parthian, and Sasanian periods (1). Cambridge: Cambridge University Press. pp. 593–612. ISBN 978-0-521-200929.
- Bosworth, C. E., ed. (1999). The History of al-Ṭabarī, Volume V: The Sāsānids, the Byzantines, the Lakhmids, and Yemen. SUNY Series in Near Eastern Studies. Albany, New York: State University of New York Press. ISBN 978-0-7914-4355-2.
- Hoyland, Robert G. (2001). Arabia and the Arabs: From the Bronze Age to the coming of Islam. London and New York: Routledge. ISBN 0-415-19535-7.
- Martindale, John R., ed. (1992). The Prosopography of the Later Roman Empire: Volume III, AD 527–641. Cambridge: Cambridge University Press. ISBN 0-521-20160-8.
- Rothstein, Gustav (1899). Die Dynastie der Lahmiden in al-Hîra. Ein Versuch zur arabisch-persichen Geschichte zur Zeit der Sasaniden [The Dynasty of the Lakhmids at al-Hira. An Essay on Arab–Persian History at the Time of the Sasanids] (in German). Berlin: Reuther & Reichard.
- Shahîd, Irfan (1995). Byzantium and the Arabs in the Sixth Century. Volume 1, Part 1: Political and Military History. Washington, DC: Dumbarton Oaks Research Library and Collection. ISBN 978-0-88402-214-5.
- Shahîd, Irfan (2010). "ʿAmr b. Hind". In Fleet, Kate; Krämer, Gudrun; Matringe, Denis; Nawas, John; Rowson, Everett (eds.). Encyclopaedia of Islam (3rd ed.). Brill Online. doi:10.1163/1573-3912_ei3_COM_23069. ISSN 1873-9830.
- Wensinck, A. J. (1960). "ʿAmr b. Hind". In Gibb, H. A. R.; Kramers, J. H.; Lévi-Provençal, E.; Schacht, J.; Lewis, B. & Pellat, Ch. (eds.). The Encyclopaedia of Islam, Second Edition. Volume I: A–B. Leiden: E. J. Brill. pp. 451–452. OCLC 495469456.
