= Yawm Halima =

554 battle

Yawn Halima
- Part of The Lazic War
Date	554 AD
Location	Present day Iraq, Jordan and Syria
Result	Ghassanids Victory
Territorial changes	Ghassanids retain Chalcis and nearby areas

Belligerents
Ghassanids	Lakhmid Kingdom

Commanders and leaders
Al-Harith ibn Jabalah	Al-Mundhir III ibn al-Nu'man †

Casualties and losses
10+ Killed; Dozen injured	Many Lakhmites killed Unknown amount injured

Yawm Halima (Arabic: يوم حليمة, lit. 'Day of Halima') is the name given to a battle fought between the rival Ghassanid and Lakhmid Arabs in the 6th century. Considered "[o]ne of the most famous battles of pre-Islamic Arabia", it was named after Halima, a Ghassanid princess who assisted the warriors of her tribe in the battle. The exact identity of the Ghassanid king who fought the battle is not certain, but he is commonly identified with al-Harith ibn Jabalah (r. 528–569), a major Byzantine client ruler who waged frequent conflicts with the Lakhmids under their respective king al-Mundhir III ibn al-Nu'man (r. 503/5–554). The Lakhmids in turn were clients of the Sassanid Persians, and the perennial tribal warfare between them and the Ghassanids was combined with the larger rivalry between Byzantium and Persia, with the Arabs fighting as auxiliaries for the two great empires.

Yawm Halima is now commonly identified with a battle fought in June 554 near Chalcis (modern Qinnasrin), where the Ghassanids confronted one of Mundhir's raids. The Lakhmids were defeated and their king Mundhir fell on the field, but Harith also lost his eldest son Jabalah.

== Sources ==
- Greatrex, Geoffrey; Lieu, Samuel N. C. (2002). The Roman Eastern Frontier and the Persian Wars (Part II, 363–630 AD). London: Routledge. ISBN 0-415-14687-9.
- Martindale, John R., ed. (1992). The Prosopography of the Later Roman Empire: Volume III, AD 527–641. Cambridge: Cambridge University Press. ISBN 0-521-20160-8.
- Retsö, Jan (2003). The Arabs in Antiquity: Their History from the Assyrians to the Umayyads. Routledge. ISBN 978-1136872891.
- Shahîd, Irfan (2009). Byzantium and the Arabs in the Sixth Century, Volume II, Part 2: Economic, Social and Cultural History. Washington, DC: Dumbarton Oaks Research Library and Collection. ISBN 978-0-88402-347-0.
