= Qabus ibn al-Mundhir =

Fourteenth King of the Lakhmid Arabs (569–573)

- King of the Lakhmid state
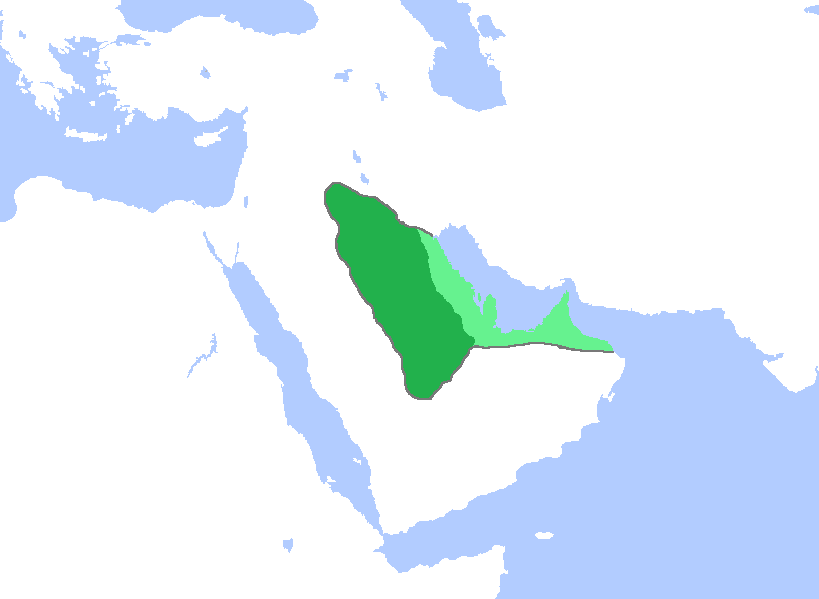
- Reign: CE 569–573
- Predecessor: Amr III
- Successor: Suhrab (Persian governor)
- Born: unknown
- Died: c. 6th century unknown
- House: Lakhmids
- Father: Al-Mundhir III
- Religion: Nestorian Christianity

Qabus ibn al-Mundhir (Arabic: قابوس ابن المنذر; in Greek sources Καβόσης, Kaboses) was the king of the Lakhmid Arabs from 569 to 573.

== Origin of his Name ==
The name Qabus derives from the Arabic triconsonantal root q-b-s (ق-ب-س), meaning fire, a burning brand, or a live ember. In classical Arabic lexicography, the fa'ul morphological pattern of this root denotes a man with a bright, handsome, and radiant face.

== Ascending to the throne ==
He succeeded his brother 'Amr III ibn al-Mundhir (r. 554–569).

== End of his reign ==
Not much is known of his reign except that he suffered a heavy defeat at the hands of the rival Byzantine-sponsored Ghassanid tribe under Al-Mundhir III ibn al-Harith in 570. After his death, the Lakhmids were ruled by a Persian governor for a year, until Qabus' brother al-Mundhir IV ibn al-Mundhir (r. 574–580) ascended to the throne.

== Sources ==
- Yarshater, Ehsan, ed. (1985–2007). The History of al-Ṭabarī (40 vols). SUNY Series in Near Eastern Studies. Albany, New York: State University of New York Press. ISBN 978-0-7914-7249-1.
- Bosworth, C. Edmund (2000). "Lakhmids". In Yarshater, Ehsan (ed.). Encyclopædia Iranica (Online ed.). Encyclopædia Iranica Foundation.
- Martindale, John R., ed. (1992). The Prosopography of the Later Roman Empire: Volume III, AD 527–641. Cambridge: Cambridge University Press. p. 258. ISBN 0-521-20160-8.
