= Fatat al-Khedr =

Poem by Al-Munakhal

- by Al-Munakhal
- Original title: فتاةُ الخِدرْ
- Written: c. 597 AD
- Country: Arabia
- Language: Arabic
- Subject(s): Love, Betrayal
- Genre(s): Pre-Islamic poetry

Fatat al-Khedr (Arabic: فتاةُ الخِدرْ; lit. 'Lady of the Palace') is an Arabic poem from the pre-Islamic period composed by Al-Munakhal. According to the old tales and what is recorded by Abu al-Faraj al-Isfahani, Al-Munakhal composed the poem for Queen Malawiya (Al-Mutajareda), the daughter of Zuhayr ibn Jadhima and the wife of King Al-Nu'man III ibn al-Mundhir, after he had an affair with her. In the end, al-Nu'man III discovered the relationship, which led to Al-Munakhal disappearance and death. With this poem, al-Munakhal was able to live in the memory of Arabic poetry, since the poem is considered to be different from the other poems that were at that time. The poem was mentioned in several other poems and imitated by many poets. It is said that he said the poem in 597 AD.
