= Al-Harith ibn Jabalah =

King of the Ghassanids from c. 528 to 569

Al-Harith V ibn Jabalah
- Reign: c. 528 – 569
- Predecessor: Jabalah IV
- Successor: al-Mundhir III
- Died: 569
- Father: Jabalah IV

Al-Ḥārith ibn Jabalah (Arabic: الحارث بن جبلة; known in Byzantine sources as Flavios Arethas (Greek: Φλάβιος Ἀρέθας) and Khālid ibn Jabalah (خالد بن جبلة) in later Islamic sources), was a king of the Ghassanids, a pre-Islamic Arab Christian tribe who lived on the eastern frontier of the Byzantine Empire. The fifth Ghassanid ruler of that name, he reigned from c. 528 to 569, the longest of any Christian Arab ruler and played a major role in the Roman–Persian Wars and the affairs of the Syriac Orthodox Church. For his services to Byzantium, he was made patrikios and vir gloriosissimus.

== Biography ==
=== Early life ===
Harith was the son of Jabalah IV (Gabalas in Greek sources) and brother of Abu Karib (Abocharabus), phylarch of Palaestina Salutaris. He became ruler of the Ghassanids and phylarch of Arabia Petraea and Palaestina Secunda probably in 528, following the death of his father in the Battle of Thannuris. Soon after (c. 529) he was raised by the Byzantine emperor Justinian I (r. 527–565), in the words of the historian Procopius, "to the dignity of king" (basilius) becoming the overall commander of all the Empire's Arab allies in the East with the title πατρίκιος καὶ φύλαρχος τῶν Σαρακηνῶν ("patrician and phylarch of the Saracens"). His actual area of control, however, may initially have been limited to the northeastern part of Byzantium's Arab frontier. At the time, the Byzantines and their Arab allies were engaged in the Iberian War against the Sasanian Empire and their Arab clients, the Lakhmids, and Justinian's move was designed to create a counterpart to the powerful Lakhmid ruler, Mundhir, who controlled the Arab tribes allied to the Persians.

=== Military career ===
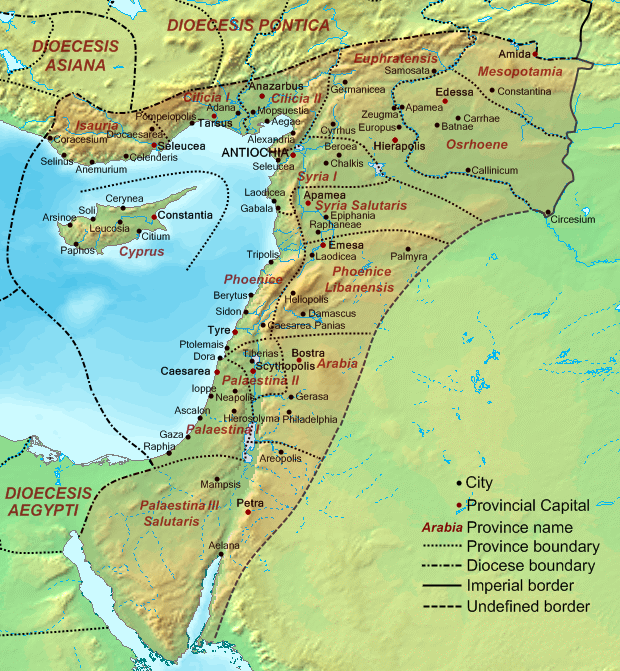
The Byzantine Diocese of the East. A number of Arab tribes under their phylarchs were settled as foederati in the various provinces. With the elevation of Harith to the kingship, the Ghassanids, based in Palaestina II, became paramount among them.

In this capacity, Harith fought on behalf of the Byzantines in all their numerous wars against Persia. Already in 528, he was one of the commanders sent on a punitive expedition against Mundhir. In 529, he helped suppress the wide-scale Samaritan revolt, capturing 20,000 boys and girls whom he sold as slaves. It was perhaps Harith's successful participation in this conflict that led Justinian to promote him to supreme phylarch. It is possible that he took part with his men in the Byzantine victory in the Battle of Dara in 530, although no source explicitly mentions him. In 531, he led a 5000-strong Arab contingent in the Battle of Callinicum. Procopius, a source hostile to the Ghassanid ruler, states that the Arabs, stationed on the Byzantine right, betrayed the Byzantines and fled, costing them the battle. John Malalas, however, whose record is generally more reliable, reports that while some Arabs indeed fled, Harith stood firm. The charge of treason levelled by Procopius against Harith seems to be further undermined by the fact that, unlike Belisarius, he was retained in command and was active in operations around Martyropolis later in the year.

In 537/538 or 539, he clashed with Mundhir of the Lakhmids over grazing rights on the lands south of Palmyra, near the old Strata Diocletiana. According to later accounts by al-Tabari, the Ghassanid ruler invaded Mundhir's territory and carried off rich booty. The Sasanian emperor, Khosrow I (r. 531–579), used this dispute as a pretext for restarting hostilities with the Byzantines, and renewed war broke out in 540. In the campaign of 541, Harith and his men, accompanied by 1200 Byzantines under generals John the Glutton and Trajan, were sent by Belisarius into a raid into Assyria. The expedition was successful, penetrated far into enemy territory and gathered much plunder. At some point, however, the Byzantine contingent was sent back, and subsequently Harith failed to either meet up with or inform Belisarius of his whereabouts. According to Procopius's account, this, in addition to the outbreak of a disease among the army, forced Belisarius to withdraw. Procopius further alleges that this was done deliberately so that the Arabs would not have to share their plunder. In his Secret History, however, Procopius gives a different account of Belisarius's inaction, completely unrelated to the Ghassanid ruler. In c. 544/545, Harith was involved in armed conflict with another Arab phylarch, al-Aswad, known in Greek as Asouades.

From c. 546 on, while the two great empires were at peace in Mesopotamia after the truce of 545, the conflict between their Arab allies continued. In a sudden raid, Mundhir captured one of Harith's sons and had him sacrificed. Soon after, however, the Lakhmids suffered a heavy defeat in a pitched battle between the two Arab armies. The conflict continued, with Mundhir staging repeated raids into Syria. In one of these raids, in June 554, Harith met him in the decisive battle of Yawm Halima (the "Day of Halima"), celebrated in pre-Islamic Arab poetry, near Chalcis, at which the Lakhmids were defeated. Mundhir fell in the field, but Harith also lost his eldest son Jabalah.

In November 563, Harith visited Emperor Justinian in Constantinople, to discuss his succession and the raids against his domains by the Lakhmid ruler Amr ibn Hind, who was eventually bought off with subsidies. He certainly left a vivid impression in the imperial capital, not least by his physical presence: John of Ephesus records that years later, the Emperor Justin II (r. 565–578), who had descended into madness, was frightened and went to hide himself when he was told "Arethas is coming for you".

=== Death ===
When al-Harith died in 569 during a supposed earthquake, he was succeeded by his son al-Mundhir III ibn al-Harith (Koine Greek: Φλάβιος Ἀλαμούνδαρος Flávios Alamúndaros in Byzantine sources). Taking advantage of this, the new Lakhmid ruler Qabus ibn al-Mundhir launched an attack, but was decisively defeated.

== Religious policies ==
In contrast to his Byzantine overlords, Harith was a staunch Miaphysite and rejected the Council of Chalcedon. Throughout his rule, al-Harith supported the anti-Chalcedonian tendencies in the region of Syria, presiding over church councils and engaging in theology, contributing actively to the Miaphysite church's revival during the sixth century. Thus in 542, following two decades of persecutions which had decapitated the Miaphysite leadership, he appealed for the appointment of new Miaphysite bishops in Syria to the Empress Theodora, whose own Miaphysite leanings were well known. Theodora then appointed Jacob Baradaeus and Theodore as bishops. Jacob in particular would prove a very capable leader, converting pagans and greatly expanding and strengthening the organization of the Miaphysite church.

== Sources ==
- Greatrex, Geoffrey; Lieu, Samuel N. C. (2002). The Roman Eastern Frontier and the Persian Wars (Part II, 363–630 AD). London: Routledge. ISBN 0-415-14687-9.
- Hoyland, Robert (2009), "Late Roman Arabia, Monophysite Monks, Arab Tribes", From Hellenism to Islam: Cultural and Linguistic Change in the Roman Near East, Cambridge University Press, doi:10.1484/J.SEC.1.100513
- Kazhdan, Alexander, ed. (1991). The Oxford Dictionary of Byzantium. Oxford and New York: Oxford University Press. ISBN 0-19-504652-8.
- Martindale, John R., ed. (1992). The Prosopography of the Later Roman Empire: Volume III, AD 527–641. Cambridge: Cambridge University Press. ISBN 0-521-20160-8.
- Shahîd, Irfan (1995). Byzantium and the Arabs in the Sixth Century, Volume 1. Washington, DC: Dumbarton Oaks. ISBN 978-0-88402-214-5.
