= Jabalah IV ibn al-Harith =

- King of the Ghassanids, Roman Phylarch
- Reign: c. 518 – 528
- Successor: al-Harith V
- Died: 528; Thannuris
- Spouse: Mariya
- Issue: al-Harith V
- Father: al-Harith IV ibn Hijr

Jabalah IV ibn al-Ḥārith (Arabic: جبلة بن الحارث), known also by the tecnonymic Abū Shammar (أبو شمر), known in Byzantine sources as Gabalas (Greek: Γαβαλᾶς), was a ruler of the Ghassanids. At first an enemy of the Eastern Roman Empire, he raided Palestine but was defeated, becoming a Byzantine vassal in 502 until circa 520, and again in 527 until his death a year later.

== Biography ==
Jabalah was the son of al-Harith (Arethas in Greek sources) and grandson of the sheikh Tha'laba. He first appears in the historical sources in 498 during the reign of Byzantine emperor Anastasius I (r. 491–518), when, according to Theophanes the Confessor, the Diocese of Oriens suffered from large-scale Arab raids. The head of one of the Arab groups invading Byzantine territory was Jabalah, who raided Palaestina III before being defeated and driven back by the local Byzantine dux, Romanus. Romanus then proceeded to evict the Ghassanids from the island of Iotabe (modern Tiran), which controlled trade with the Red Sea and which had been occupied by the Arabs since 473. After a series of hard-fought engagements, the island returned to Byzantine control.

In 502, Emperor Anastasius concluded a treaty of alliance with the Kindaites and Ghassanids, turning them into imperial allies (foederati). With the outbreak of the Anastasian War against Sassanid Persia, the Ghassanids fought on the Byzantine side, although only one operation, an attack against the Lakhmid capital of al-Hirah in July 513, is explicitly attributed to them.

The Ghassanids settled deep inside the Byzantine limes, and in a Syriac source for July 519 they are attested as having their "opulent" headquarters at al-Jabiya (Gabitha) in the Gaulanitis (Golan Heights), where Jabalah had succeeded his father as king over his tribe. With the rise of the pro-Chalcedonian Justin I (r. 518–527) to the imperial throne in 518 and the subsequent re-imposition of Chalcedonian orthodoxy throughout the Empire, however, the staunchly Monophysite Ghassanids withdrew from the alliance in c. 520 and retreated into the northern Hejaz.

Not until the last year of Justin's reign was the alliance between Byzantium and the Ghassanids restored. Although the Ghassanids are not explicitly mentioned by the sources, the scholar Irfan Shahîd identifies Jabalah with the Arab phylarch known with the nickname al-Aṣfar (الأصفر), rendered in Greek as Tapharas (Ταφαρᾶς). This was the Arabic version of the honorary Roman gentilicium "Flavius", which may have been awarded to Jabalah by the Emperor upon his return to Byzantine allegiance; this identification, however, is not certain. In 528, the Ghassanids took part in the conflict with Persia and her Lakhmid Arab allies, first in a punitive expedition against the Lakhmid ruler al-Mundhir, and then in the Battle of Thannuris under Belisarius's command, where Jabalah/Tapharas was killed when he fell from his horse.

== Family ==
Jabalah's wife appears to have been Māriya, who was according to Arabic tradition a famous Kindaite princess. From her, he had at least three sons: the famous al-Harith ibn Jabalah, the Arethas of the Byzantines, who succeeded him, Abu Karib who was phylarch of the province of Palaestina III, and, as is apparent from his tecnonymic, an older son named Shamir, about whom nothing is known.

== Sources ==
- Greatrex, Geoffrey; Lieu, Samuel N. C. (2002). The Roman Eastern Frontier and the Persian Wars (Part II, 363–630 AD). London, United Kingdom: Routledge. ISBN 0-415-14687-9.
- Martindale, John R., ed. (1980). The Prosopography of the Later Roman Empire: Volume II, AD 395–527. Cambridge: Cambridge University Press. ISBN 0-521-20159-4.
- Shahîd, Irfan (1989). Byzantium and the Arabs in the Fifth Century. Washington, DC: Dumbarton Oaks Research Library and Collection. ISBN 0-88402-152-1.
- Shahîd, Irfan (1995). Byzantium and the Arabs in the Sixth Century. Volume 1, Part 1: Political and Military History. Washington, DC: Dumbarton Oaks Research Library and Collection. ISBN 978-0-88402-214-5.
- Whittow, Mark (1999). "Rome and the Jafnids: Writing the History of a Sixth-Century Tribal Dynasty". In Humphrey, John H. (ed.). The Roman and Byzantine Near East. Some Recent Archaeological Research. Volume 2. Portsmouth, Rhode Island: Journal of Roman Archaeology L.L.C. pp. 207–224. ISBN 978-1-8878-2931-1.
