= Al-Munakhal =

6th-century pre-Islamic Arab poet and sailor

- المُنَخَّل اليشكري
- Born: Mecca, Hejaz
- Died: 607 CE; Arabia
- Occupations: Poet, Sailor
- Writing career
- Language: Arabic
- Notable work: Fatat al-Khedr (Lady of the Palace)

Al-Munakhal al-Yashkuri (Arabic: المُنَخَّل اليشكري) (died 607), whose real name was 'Amr ibn Mas'ud al-Yashkuri (عمرو بن مسعود اليشكري), was a pre-Islamic Arab poet and sailor. He is known for composing the poem Fatat Al-Khedr or Fatat al-Qasr (فتاة القصر; lit. 'Lady of the Palace') and for having an affair with both the Lakhmid princess Hind bint 'Amr, daughter of the former king 'Amr ibn Hind (r. 554–569), and queen Al-Mutajarridah|al-Mutajareda, the wife of the king al-Nu'man III (r. 580–602).

== Life ==
Little is known in certainty about al-Munakhal's life. He was born in the city of Mecca to the subtribe of Banu Yashkur which belongs to the larger Banu Bakr tribe. Although he died at a young age, he spent most of his life in the Lakhmid court in al-Hira. There, he pursued a secret affair with the Lakhmid queen al-Mutajareda. The scholar Ibn Qutaybah (d. 889) reports that the people of their time believe al-Munakhal was the actual father of al-Nu'man III two sons by al-Mutajareda. According to Kitab al-Aghani of Abu al-Faraj al-Isfahani (d. 967), al-Munakhal was one of the most handsome amongst the Arabs. And he was responsible for the famous poet al-Nabigha (d. 604) departure from the Lakhmid court of al-Nu'man III. The Lakhmid king ordered al-Nabigha to describe his wife in a poem, eventually, he described her body parts in great details. Thus, her lover al-Munakhal, out of jealousy, said to the king; "No one could compose such poetry except one who had tried her!" al-Nu'man III falling for al-Munakhal's accusation, made al-Nabigha escape the court of the Lakhmid to their rivals, the Ghassanid court.

== Death ==
There are several stories regarding his death. For instance, the Lakhmid al-Nu'man III entered the chamber of his wife surprisingly, where he found his wife al-Mutajareda and al-Munakhal together. Henceforth, al-Numan ordered for al-Munakhal to be imprisoned and tortured, and from that day he was never seen again. Hence the Arabic proverb, "Until Munakhal shall return", an expression for something that is not expected to ever happen. But, Abu al-Faraj al-Isfahani narrates a different story in which al-Munakhal was imprisoned and killed by the order of the king Amr ibn Hind after news reached him about the involvement of his daughter Hind in an affair with her secret lover al-Munakhal.
