= 569 =

Calendar year

569 in various calendars
- Gregorian calendar: 569; DLXIX
- Ab urbe condita: 1322
- Armenian calendar: 18; ԹՎ ԺԸ
- Assyrian calendar: 5319
- Balinese saka calendar: 490–491
- Bengali calendar: −25 – −24
- Berber calendar: 1519
- Buddhist calendar: 1113
- Burmese calendar: −69
- Byzantine calendar: 6077–6078
- Chinese calendar: 戊子年 (Earth Rat); 3266 or 3059 — to — 己丑年 (Earth Ox); 3267 or 3060
- Coptic calendar: 285–286
- Discordian calendar: 1735
- Ethiopian calendar: 561–562
- Hebrew calendar: 4329–4330
- Hindu calendars
- Vikram Samvat: 625–626
- Shaka Samvat: 490–491
- Kali Yuga: 3669–3670
- Holocene calendar: 10569
- Iranian calendar: 53 BP – 52 BP
- Islamic calendar: 55 BH – 54 BH
- Javanese calendar: 457–458
- Julian calendar: 569; DLXIX
- Korean calendar: 2902
- Minguo calendar: 1343 before ROC 民前1343年
- Nanakshahi calendar: −899
- Seleucid era: 880/881 AG
- Thai solar calendar: 1111–1112
- Tibetan calendar: ས་ཕོ་བྱི་བ་ལོ་ (male Earth-Rat); 695 or 314 or −458 — to — ས་མོ་གླང་ལོ་ (female Earth-Ox); 696 or 315 or −457

Year 569 (DLXIX) was a common year starting on Tuesday of the Julian calendar. The denomination 569 for this year has been used since the early medieval period, when the Anno Domini calendar era became the prevalent method in Europe for naming years.

== Events ==
=== By place ===
==== Byzantine Empire ====
- Emperor Justin II and his wife Sophia send a relic of the "True Cross" to the Frankish princess Radegund, who has founded a monastery at Poitiers.
- The Garamantian Kingdom (modern Libya) signs a peace treaty with the Byzantine Empire. The capital city of Garama is converted to Christianity.

==== Europe ====
- September – The Lombards conquer Forum Iulii (Cividale del Friuli) in northeastern Italy. Later in the year, the Lombards conquer Milan.
- Gisulf I, nephew of Alboin, is appointed as the first duke of Friuli (approximate date).

==== Arabia ====
- Al-Mundhir III succeeds his father Al-Harith V and becomes king of the Ghassanids.

=== By topic ===
==== Religion ====
- The Nubian kingdom of Alodia is converted to Christianity by Byzantine missionaries (according to John of Ephesus).
- John of Ephesus completes his "Biographies of Eastern Saints" (approximate date).
- November 19 – In Poitiers the "Vexilla Regis" is first sung during the Procession.

== Births ==
- Yángdi, emperor of the Sui dynasty (d. 618)
- Muhammad, Prophet of Islam

== Deaths ==
- Ainmuire mac Sétnai, High King of Ireland
- Al-Harith ibn Jabalah, king of the Ghassanids
- Peter IV, Coptic Orthodox patriarch of Alexandria
- Wu Cheng Di, emperor of Northern Qi (b. 537)
