= Al-Mundhir IV ibn al-Mundhir =

King of the Lakhmid Arabs between 575–580

- Reign: 575–580
- Predecessor: Suhrab
- Successor: al-Nu'man III ibn al-Mundhir
- Wives: Salma bint al-Sa'igh, Mariya bint al-Harith ibn Julhum, unnamed others
- Issue: al-Nu'man III, al-Aswad, unnamed others
- Father: al-Mundhir III ibn al-Nu'man

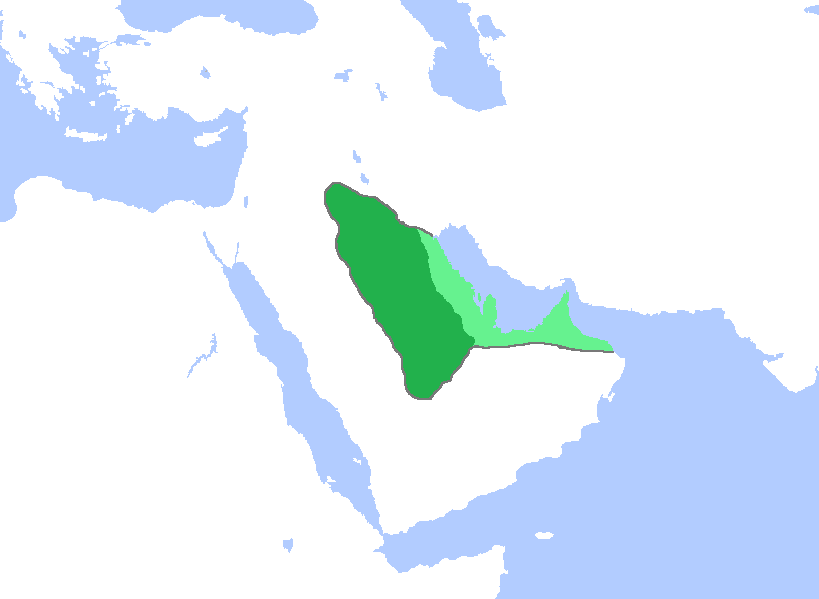
Shows the location

Al-Mundhir IV ibn al-Mundhir (Arabic: المنذر بن المنذر) was the king of the Lakhmid Arabs in 575–580.

The son of al-Mundhir III ibn al-Nu'man (r. 502–554), he succeeded to the throne after his brothers Amr (r. 554–569) and Qabus (r. 569 – c. 574). His succession was unpopular with the inhabitants of the capital, al-Hirah, because of his violent nature and his paganism. A Persian governor, Suhrab, was appointed and ruled Hirah for a year, until Zayd ibn Hammad (father of the poet Adi ibn Zayd) persuaded the people to accept Mundhir as their king.

The events of his reign are mostly obscure, except for the sack and razing of Al-Hirah by the Ghassanids under al-Mundhir III ibn al-Harith. He was succeeded by his son al-Nu'man III ibn al-Mundhir (r. 580–602), the last Lakhmid king of Hirah.

Two of his wives are known by name: Salma bint al-Sa'igh, the mother of his heir al-Nu'man, a Jew captured during a raid on Fadak; and the Christian Mariya bint al-Harith ibn Julhum from the tribe of Taym al-Ribab, mother of a son named al-Aswad. Mundhir had twelve or thirteen sons, but only al-Nu'man and al-Aswad are known by name.

== Sources ==
- Bosworth, C. E., ed. (1999). The History of al-Ṭabarī, Volume V: The Sāsānids, the Byzantines, the Lakhmids, and Yemen. SUNY Series in Near Eastern Studies. Albany, New York: State University of New York Press. pp. 370–371. ISBN 978-0-7914-4355-2.
- Shahîd, Irfan (1991). "al-Mund̲h̲ir IV". In Bosworth, C. E.; van Donzel, E. & Pellat, Ch. (eds.). The Encyclopaedia of Islam, Second Edition. Volume VI: Mahk–Mid. Leiden: E. J. Brill. p. 568. doi:10.1163/1573-3912_islam_SIM_5508. ISBN 978-90-04-08112-3.
- Michael Whitby, ed. (2000). The ecclesiastical history of Evagrius Scholasticus (PDF). Liverpool University Press. p. 292. ISBN 0-85323-605-4. Archived from the original (PDF) on 2016-03-04.
