= Al-Mundhir III ibn al-Nu'man =

6th-century king of the Lakhmids

- King of the Lakhmids
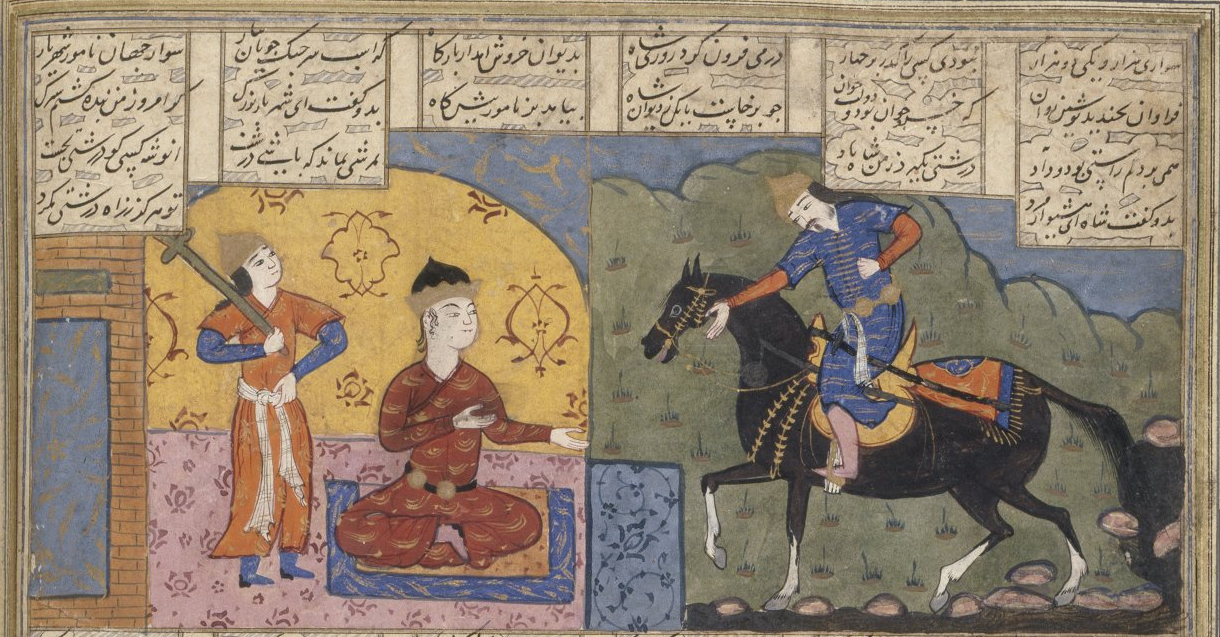
- Shahnameh illustration of al-Mundhir III (right) seeking the help of the Sasanian king Khosrow I against the Byzantine Empire.
- Reign: 503/505–554
- Predecessor: Abu Ya'fur ibn Alqama or Imru al-Qays III ibn al-Nu'man
- Successor: 'Amr III ibn al-Mundhir
- Born: Al-Hirah (present day Iraq)
- Died: 554; Yawm Halima
- Issue: Amr ibn Hind; Qabus ibn al-Mundhir; Al-Mundhir IV ibn al-Mundhir
- House: Lakhmids
- Father: Al-Nu'man II ibn al-Aswad or Imru al-Qays III ibn al Nu'man
- Mother: Maria bint Awf bin Geshem

Al-Mundhir III ibn al-Nu'man (Arabic: المنذر بن النعمان), also known as Al-Mundhir ibn Imri' al-Qays (المنذر بن إمرئ القيس) (died 554) was the king of the Lakhmids in 503/505–554.

== Biography ==
His mother's name was Maria bint Awf bin Geshem. The son of al-Nu'man II ibn al-Aswad, he succeeded his father either immediately upon his death in 503 or after a short interregnum by Abu Ya'fur ibn Alqama. He is one of the most renowned Lakhmid kings, and is known for his military achievements. These started before he was crowned a king, during the Anastasian War, with a raid in Palaestina Salutaris and Arabia Petraea in the year 503, capturing a large number of Romans. Mundhir's raids covered the area between Euphrates from the east up to Egypt in the west and Najd southward, where in 521 The Himyarites Responding to the cry of help from local Arab tribes Led a campaign against Lakhmids forcing them to withdraw from Najd.

In 526, the Iberian War between the Byzantine Empire and Sasanian Empire began, and Mundhir attacked Syria, ravaging it. Two high-ranking Roman commanders, Timostratus and John, were captured. This caused Justinian I to send al-Mundhir an embassy for peace consisting of Abraham, son of Euphrasius (his son was Nonnosus the historian), and Simeon of Beth Arsham. They were joined by Sergius of Rasafa (who was later sent by Justinian with gifts to al-Mundhir). In 528, al-Mundhir attacked Syria and returned with much booty. The following year (529), he renewed his attacks, firstly taking all the area of frontiers, which was Khabour. Afterward, he marched towards Arzona and Nisibis, despoiling and ravaging the cities before continuing to Apamea and Chalcedon. Al-Mundhir could not conquer Antioch because Justinian dispatched a large army to protect it. Al-Mundhir returned with much booty, among them 400 nuns, whom he burnt to the goddess al-Uzza.

Al-Mundhir was killed in the battle of Yawm Halima with the Ghassanids under al-Harith ibn Jabalah in June 554. He was succeeded by his three sons, Amr ibn Hind (r. 554–569), Qabus ibn al-Mundhir (r. 569–573) and al-Mundhir IV ibn al-Mundhir (r. 574–580).
