= Ancient towns in Saudi Arabia =

Settlements from Ancient Arabia

Location of ancient towns in Saudi Arabia

Thirteen ancient towns have been discovered in Saudi Arabia up to the present day. These include, Mecca, Qaryat al-Fāw, the Al-Ukhdūd archeological area, Hegra (Madā'in Ṣālih), Jubbah, Tārūt, Al-Shuwayḥaṭiyah, Thāj, Taimaa and Dūmat Al-Jandal. There are still more ancient towns in Saudi Arabia, but little information is currently available on them. Saudi Arabia occupies a unique and distinctive geographic location, bridging civilizations between continents. In ancient times the Arabian peninsula served as a corridor for trade; therefore it saw the beginning of many civilizations, the relics of which are still evident today. The Saudi government has recently established the Saudi Commission for Tourism and Antiquities, which is responsible for the preservation of these cities.

== Qaryat al-Fāw ==
Qaryat al-Fāw (Arabic: قرية الفاو) also appears in the southern text as Qaryat Dhu Kahl (in association with the god Kahl), Qaryat al-Hamraa and Dhat al-Jnan. The name derives from its geographical location at a pass through the Ṭuwayq Mountains where it intersects with Wādī al-Dawāsir, overlooking the northwestern edge of the Empty Quarter desert. It is located about 700 km (430 miles) southwest of Riyadh, the capital city of Saudi Arabia. Qaryat al-Fāw is considered one of the most important ancient cities in Saudi Arabia, and it was the capital of the Kindah Kingdom from the 1st century BC to the 4th century AD, which was one of the ancient Arab kingdoms in the middle of the Arabian Peninsula.

This city was known as Dhāt Kahl in the South Arabian text, although in the golden age it was called Qaryat al-Hamrā' ("the Red City") and Dhāt al-Jinān ("the City of Gardens"), and today it is known as Qaryat al-Fāw. The city covers an area of approximately three kilometers by one. The ancient city was inhabited for about eight centuries, and during this period the city fought several wars with the Kingdom of Saba' (c. 8th century B.C. to AD 275), and in AD 228, Imru’ al-Qays fought the city. However, the city is not mentioned in any Arab history books apart from Abū Muḥammad al-Ḥasan al-Hamdānī's book entitled Ṣifat Jazīrat al-'Arab.

The city had an important location, as it was located on a trade route, which had a great impact on the lives of the inhabitants due to their contacts with people from other nations. The archaeological excavations in the city revealed that the city had grown and evolved gradually from the point of the trade route to another important commercial point in the eastern part of the trade route that extends from the south of the Arabian Peninsulas through Najrān across the Gulf and Mesopotamia. It became the economic, religious, cultural and social centre of the central Arabian Peninsula, as well as the capital of the Kindah Kingdom in their first period.

=== Discovery ===
Interest in Qaryat al-Fāw as an archaeological site dates back to the 1940s when a reference to it was made by some official workers of the Saudi Aramco oil company. In 1952, three of the company's staff visited the city and wrote about it. In 1996, the village was visited by an expert from the Antiquities and Museums agency. In 1976, it was visited first the History and Antiquities Association of King Saud University in Riyadh and then by the Saudi Commission for Tourism and Antiquities, both aiming to study the site, and more specifically, to identify the location of the city. The work took place between 1972 and 1995. Archaeological excavations were carried out by a team from King Saud University team, from 1970 to 2003, and uncovered two major sectors of the town. The first was a residential area, consisting of houses, squares, streets and a market place, while the second was a sacred area, consisting of temples and tombs. The general architectural plan is very indicative of ancient towns in Arabia. Abdulrahman al-Ansary, former professor of archaeology at King Saud University in Riyadh and a member of Saudi Arabia's Consultative Council and of the council's Committee on Education is considered as the founder of the rediscovery of the city of Qaryat al-Fāw.

=== Market Area ===
Built near the western edge of the valley which separates between the Ṭuwayq Mountains and the city limits east of the residential area was a large market, 30.75 m in length from west to east, and 25.20 m north to south. It was surrounded by a huge fence consisting of three contiguous parts; the middle one was made of limestone and the internal and external ones made of clay. The market consisted of three floors with seven towers in the market's corners and three in the structure in the middle of the north, south and east of the building. The only entrance to the market was located in the southern half of the west side and was a small door leading to a small square.

=== Literature ===
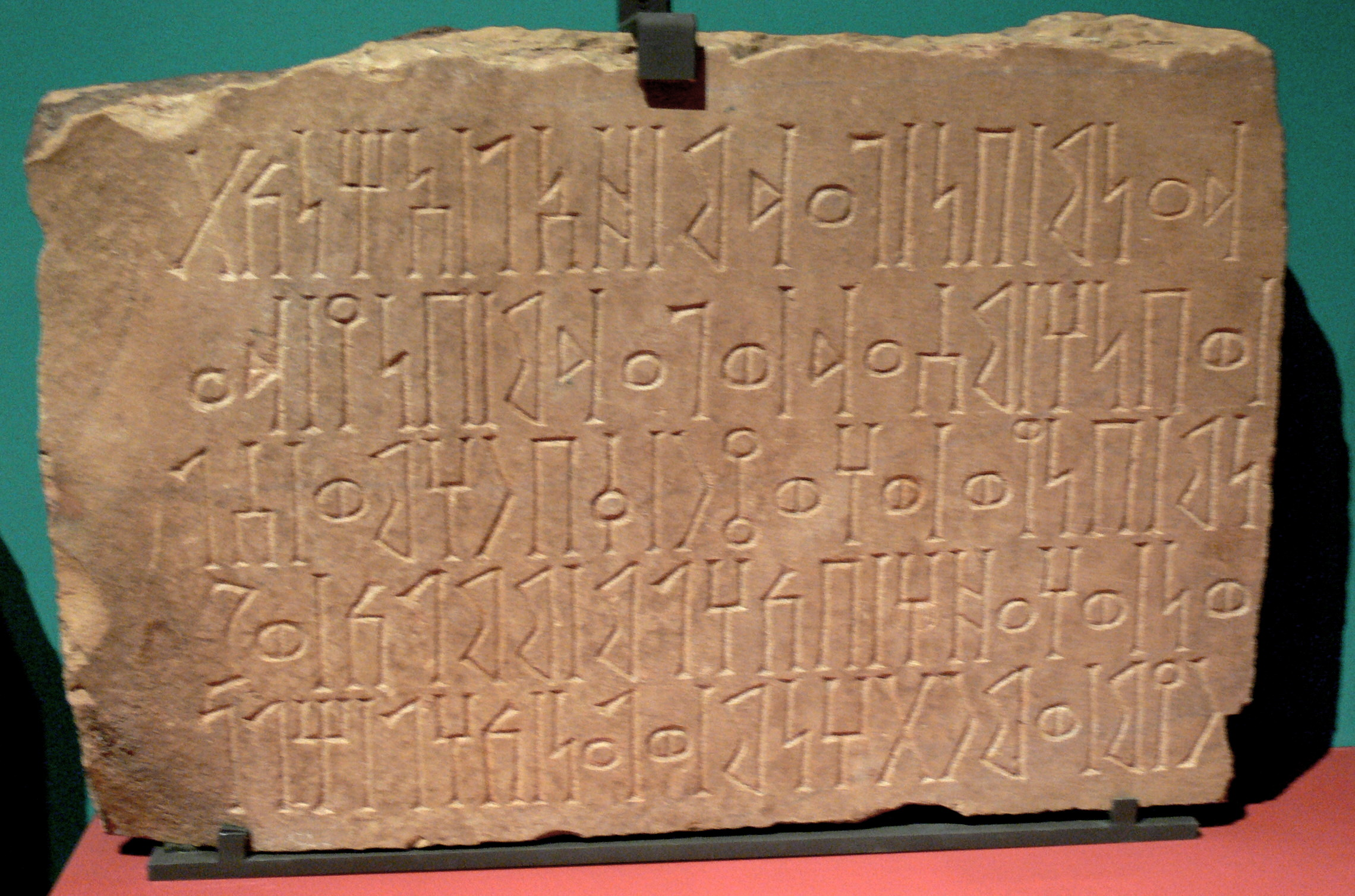
Stone plaque with Sabaean donation inscription for a mausoleum (1st century BC), from Qaryat al-Faw

The residents of the Qaryat al-Fāw were concerned with writing, and a great deal of literature was found on the slopes of the mountains, in the market, temples, while paintings were found in the city's residential, and tombstones, pottery and other archaeological materials were also found in the city. The language used was a mix of the language of the north and south. They wrote on different topics, including on religious and commercial issues, as well as on subjects related to personal matters, and through their available literature it has been possible to identify some names of people, tribes, gods, as well as to identify the possible existence of the relations between Qaryat al-Fāw and other kingdoms. A vast amount of inscriptions was found in Qaryat al-Fāw.

=== Temples ===
Three temples and one altar were found in Qaryat al-Fāw, two in the area to the west of the market, and one outside the market area. In addition, more than one type of cemetery was found in the town, as there were both public and family graveyards.

=== Current Condition ===
As of January 1, 2014, the site is completely fenced for protection against looters by the Saudi Government. The site is tended by a Saudi caretaker whose family has ties to the immediate area. The site was authorized and allocated funds for significant improvement, preservation and the construction of a modern visitors center. Construction was to have been completed by December, 2013, however to date no construction has started. The site is extremely impressive, with multiple Nobelmans and Warrior class tombs spaced along the Eastern periphery. The Kings tomb resides somewhat separated and to the North West of the city. The market place shows significant erosion of the walls, which have buried almost an entire story of the once 3 or 4 level artifice. Remnants of grain storage and baking ovens can still be seen today. Located East of the city lies a large jebel, with significant caves and petroglyphs.

== Al-Okhdood ==
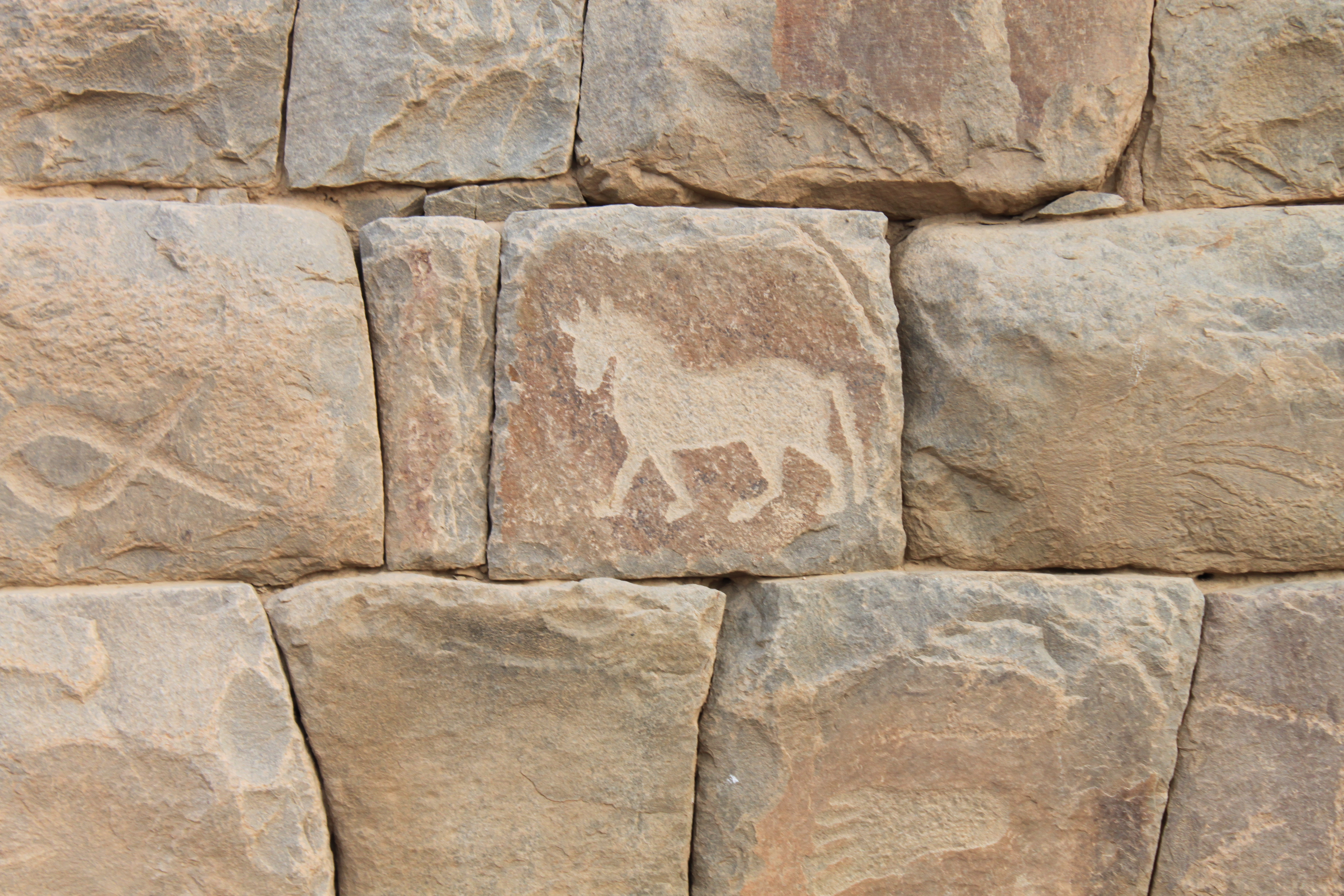
A wall in the old city of Najran in Bir Hima region

Al-Ukhdūd (Arabic: الأخدود), formerly known as Raqmat (Arabic: رقمات), is located in the south of Saudi Arabia in Bir Hima/Najrān region, about 1,300 km (810 miles) to the south of Riyadh. Exploration of the city was begun around 1997 by group of Saudi historians. Since then, many antiques have been found, and the greatest discovery in the town was of the place that the ruler of Himyarite Kingdom called Ukhdūd in Arabic. According to the experts, the city was built between the 1st century BC and the 1st century AD. The story of these people is mentioned in the Quran, in the sura al-Burūj.

== Madā'in Sālih ==
Madā'in Ṣāliḥ or Hegra (Arabic: الحِجر), also called Al-Ḥijr, is an ancient city located in the northern part of the Hejazi region of Saudi Arabia, about 1,400 km (870 miles) to the north of Riyadh. Madā'in Ṣāliḥ is considered to be one of the most important and oldest ancient cities in the country. Madā'in Ṣāliḥ lies to the northwest of the city of Al-'Ula, in a strategic position on one of the most important ancient trade routes, which linked the south of the Arabian peninsula to the north, as well as to the great economic and cultural centres of Mesopotamia, Syria and Egypt. It was the second-largest city in the kingdom of the Nabateans. The Nabateans were a group of Arab tribes whose economy was based on pastoralism, and over time they settled, created and developed several cities and become traders. The Nabataeans occupied a territory in the south of the area of Ash-Shām where they founded the Nabataeans; their capital was Petra in Jordan, which was chosen as one of the Seven Wonders of the World in 2007. Their language was a form of old northern Arabic. The landscape of Madā'in Ṣāliḥ is characterized by impressive rock formations, sandstone hills of varied colours, from red to yellow and white. The area of Madā'in Ṣāliḥ covered by the site is about 1,621 ha (4,010 acres). The tombs are distributed in groups of various importance, as follows:

- Qaṣr al-Ṣāni' (Arabic: قَصْر ٱلصَّانِع) is the first group of tombs and occupies two sandstone hills in the southern part of the site. The western hill contains only one large tomb, called Qaṣr al-Ṣāni', while the second one contains six small undated funerary chambers.
- The tombs of the residential area: this group of monuments lies in the south of the residential area. It comprises two sandstone hills, one small and one large. The large one contains eighteen tombs.
- Qaṣr al-Farid is located in the southwest of the site. It was given its name as it was completely isolated from the other tombs.
- Qaṣr al-Bint (Arabic: قَصْر ٱلْبِنْت): this group of tombs lies west of Jabal Ithib. It comprises two sandstone hills, one containing twenty-nine tombs and the second, two tombs.
- Jibal Athilb (Arabic: جِبَال أَثِلْب): The name is a toponym referring to two mountain ranges which dominate the site from the northeast.
- Jabal al-Maḥjar (Arabic: جَبَل ٱلْمَهْجَر): this group of tombs is located to the northwest of the complex of Qaṣr al-Bint and occupies three elongated sandstone hills, one of which is called the Jabal al-Maḥjar. This area contains fourteen tombs.
- Khaymāt (Arabic: ٱلْخَيْمَات): this group of tombs is located to the west of the Ḥijāz railway. It contains fifty-three tombs.
- The residential area (Arabic: مجموعة مقابر ٱلْمِنْطَقَة): is located in the plain which lies in the middle of the site.

Madā'in Ṣāliḥ was recognized by UNESCO as a site of patrimony, the first world heritage site in Saudi Arabia. The story of these people called the people of Thamūd (including Petra) is mentioned several times in the Quran along with prophet Ṣāliḥ.

== Jubbah ==
Jabbah (Arabic: جبَّة) is located in the Ḥā'il Province about 730 km (450 miles) north of Riyadh. The city was built around 3000 years ago.

== Tārūt ==
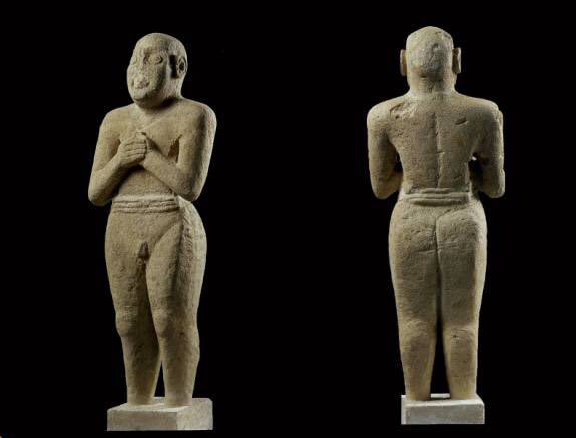
The Worshiping Servant statue from Tarout Island (2500 BC)

Tārūt Island (Arabic: جزيرة تاروت) is an ancient island in the Persian Gulf located off the city of Qaṭīf. The name is said to be derived from that of the goddess of love and war, a Phoenician and Canaanite goddess Astārūt. Tarut is known for its historical landmarks, such as the Tārūt Castle.

== Al-Shuwayḥaṭiyah ==
Al-Shuwayḥaṭiyah (Arabic: ٱلشُّوَيْحَطِيَّة) is located in the north of Saudi Arabia about 1,300 km (810 miles) north of Riyadh in the Al-Jawf region.

== Thāj ==
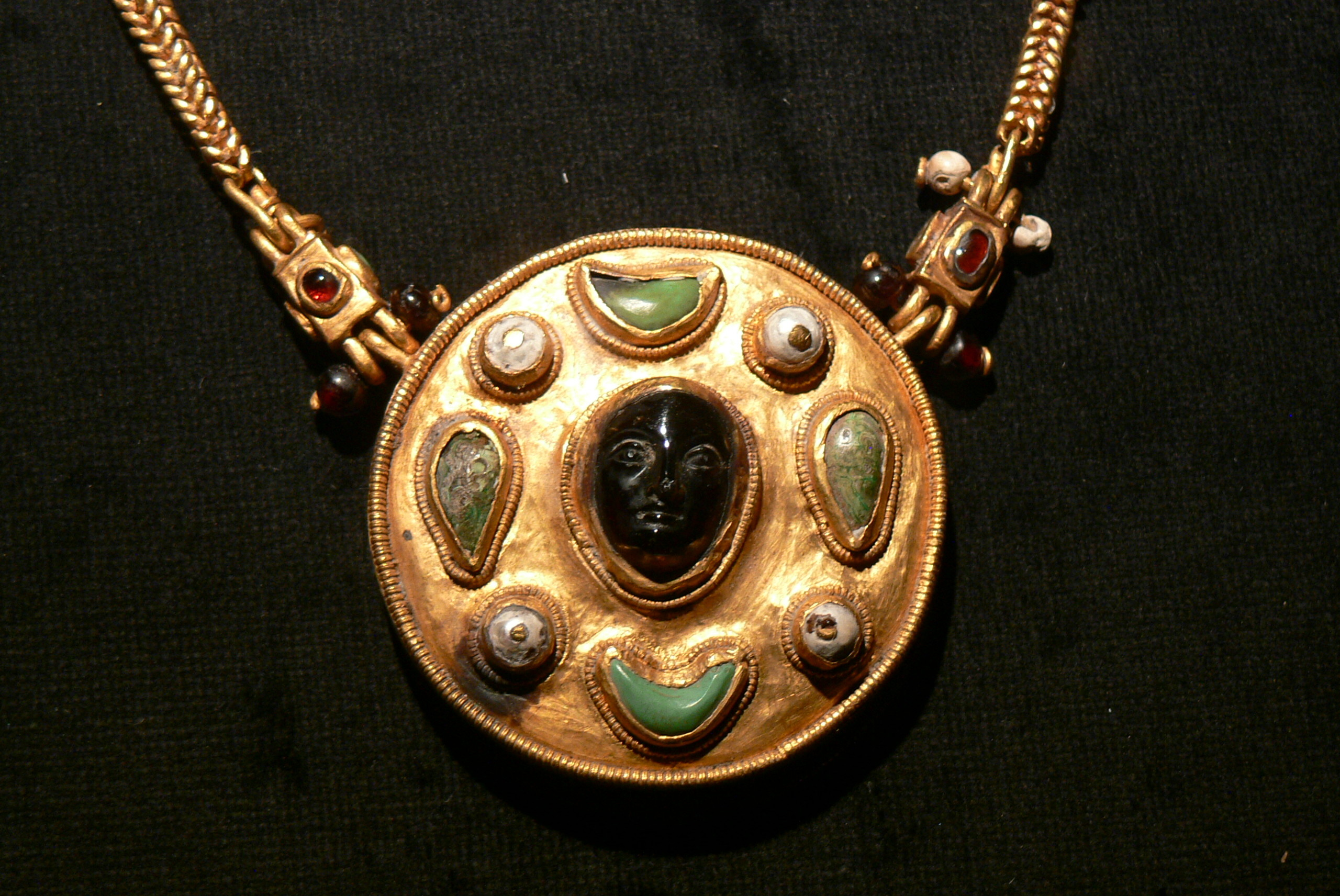
A necklace from Thaj (1st century AD)

Thāj (Arabic: ثَاج; pronounced [θaːd͡ʒ]) (26°22′55.92″N 48°20′3.48″E) is located in the northwest of the Eastern Province, about 600 km (370 miles) northeast of Riyadh. The majority of historians believe that the city of Thāj was built in the period of the Greeks, after the conquest of Alexander in 330 B.C. The most important discoveries in the city were nine stones carved with writing dating back to the middle of the first millennium BC.

== Dūmat Al-Jandal ==
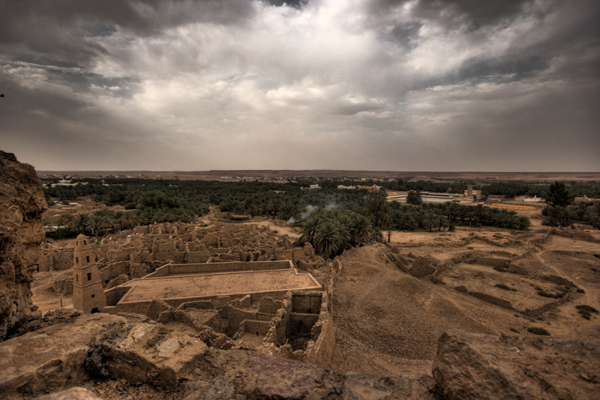
Ruins of the ancient city of Adummatu.

Dūmat al-Jandal (Arabic: دومة الجندل) (10th century BCE), is the name for an ancient city of ruins located in North Western Saudi Arabia in the Al-Jawf Province. The name Dūmat al-Jandal means literally "Dūmah of the Stone", since this was the territory of Dūmah, one of the twelve sons of Ishmael. The city's ancient Akkadian name was Adumatu.

== See also ==
- Cities of the ancient Near East
- Al-'Ula: Dedan - Kingdom of Lihyan (~5th century BCE)
- Kinda: Yemeni tribe (2nd century BCE)
- Medina: Yathrib (6th century BCE)
- Tayma: Tema (8th century BCE)
