= Kindite =

Kindite is an adjective referring to:

- Kinda (tribe), an ancient and medieval Arab tribe
- Kingdom of Kinda, a tribal kingdom in north and central Arabia in c. 450–c. 550
