= Abdulrahman al-Ansary =

Saudi archaeologist (1935–2023)

Abdulrahman al-Ansary عبدالرحمن بن محمد الطيب الأنصاري
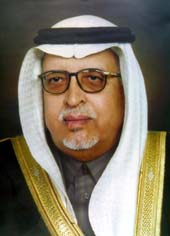
- Born: 10 October 1935; Medina, Saudi Arabia
- Died: 6 March 2023 (aged 87)
- Education: University of Leeds, Cairo University
- Scientific career
- Fields: Archeology, history
- Doctoral advisor: Benedikt Isserlin

Abdulrahman al-Ansary (Arabic: عبدالرحمن بن محمد الطيب الأنصاري; 10 October 1935 – 6 March 2023) was a Saudi Arabian archaeologist and professor of archeology at King Saud University, and also member of the first and second terms of the Consultative Assembly of Saudi Arabia. He is considered the founder of the rediscovery of archeological site of Qaryat al-Fau.

== Education ==
Al-Ansary earned a bachelor's degree in Arabic language and literature from Cairo University in 1960 and a Doctor of Philosophy degree from the department of Semitic Studies of the University of Leeds in 1966. During his doctoral studies, he focused on the comparative study of Lihynite personal names and trained at archeological excavations with his thesis supervisor at Durham University and Motya, Sicily, and with Professor Kathleen Kenyon in Jerusalem in 1966.

== Career ==
Al-Ansary was a faculty member of King Saud University (formerly Riyadh University) from 1966 to 1999 where he held several positions and roles including dean of the College of Arts (1971–1972 and 1988–1994), chairman of the Department of History (1974–1978) and chairman of the Department of Archeology and Museology (1978–1986). Between 1996 and 2001, he served as a member of the Consultative Assembly of Saudi Arabia, which were its first two terms.

Al-Ansary is considered the pioneering academic who established the study of archeology in Saudi Arabia by taking the leading role in creating an archeology concentration in the Department of History at King Saud University and later the Department of Archeology and Museology in 1978, the first in the country. Professor al-Ansary is perhaps most known for leading the archeological excavation in the city of Qaryat al-Fau between 1972 and 1995 while at King Saud University. In 1982 he authored a book entitled "Qaryat al-Fau: A Portrait of Pre-Islamic Civilisation in Saudi Arabia", which presented the results of the first six seasons of excavation.

== Books ==
Book Title	Year of Publishing	Remarks
Qaryat Al-Faw: A Portrait of Pre-Islamic Arab Civilization in Saudi Arabia	1982	
Najran: starting point for caravans	2003	Series (Visible Villages on Incense route).
Al-Ula and Madain Saleh (Al-Hijr): Civilization of Two Cities	2005	Series (Visible Villages on Incense route) in collaboration with Hussein Abu Al-Hassan.
Ḥaʼil the land of Hatem	2005	Series (Visible Villages on Incense route) in collaboration with Farag Allah Ahmed Youssef.
Taif: one of the two villages	2005	Series (Visible Villages on Incense route) in collaboration With Mohammed bin Sultan Al-Otaibi.
Khaybar: The conquest that pleased the Prophet, may God bless him and grant him peace	2006	Series (Visible Villages on Incense route).
Arab Islamic civilization through the ages in the Kingdom of Saudi Arabia	2006	In collaboration With others.
Tayma gathering land of Civilizations	2007	Series (Visible Villages on Incense route) in collaboration with Hussein Abu Al-Hassan.
Al-Jawf: the fortified fortress of the North	2008	Series (Visible Villages on Incense route)
Asir: the majestic fortress of the south	2009	Series (Visible Villages on Incense route) in collaboration with Khaled Al-Asmari.
Al-Baha: The smiling beauty	2009	Series (Visible Villages on Incense route).
Al-Qassim: History, Civilization and Trade	2012	Series (Visible Villages on Incense route)
Qatif and Al-Ahsa: Antiquities and Civilization	_ _ _	Series (Visible Villages on Incense route) in collaboration with Farag Allah Ahmed Youssef.
Riyadh: Bride of Cities	2015	Series (Visible Villages on Incense route) in collaboration with Farag Allah Ahmed Youssef.

== Death ==
Al-Ansary died on 6 March 2023, at the age of 87.
