= Zaid Inan 11 =

3rd century AD Sabaic poem

Zaid Inan 11 (Zaid ʿInān 11, abbreviated ZI 11), also known as the Hymn to Almaqah or MB 2004 I-94, is a 3rd century AD Sabaic poem discovered as a votive inscription stored at the Temple of Awwam in the city of Marib from pre-Islamic South Arabia. Marib was the capital of the Kingdom of Saba, located in modern-day eastern Yemen. The poem is a religious-military hymn dedicated to the glory of the god Almaqah, who in the text is called Kahl. ZI 11 shows Kahl leading an army of Sabaeans into Al-Yamama (then called al-Jaww), a region that he pierces and conquers in a triumphant victory. According to the inscription, this campaign is part of Kahl's "rising in the East" (meaning to overcome the night).

The poem also reveals a development in pre-Islamic religion as Kahl absorbs the properties and functions of several deities that had come before him in the pantheon. According to some historians, this represents an ongoing trend in South Arabian religion at the time towards the emergence of pre-Islamic Arabian monotheism. The second step of this process may have been the transformation of Kahl into Rahmanan before the reigns of the kings Malkikarib Yuhamin and Abu Karib.

== Context and notability ==
The poem was discovered, and named after, Zaid Inan, who published it in 1976. It has since been studied by almost all major historians of pre-Islamic South Arabia.

The poem is notable for several reasons: it is the earliest known piece of literature that makes a consistent use of end-rhyme, it is the earliest mythological text known from South Arabia, and that it possesses a literary structure that is comparable later pre-Islamic Arabic poetry and the Quran. It also uses formulas well known from other Sabaic inscriptions, such as invocations "By (the power) of Kahl (i.e., Almaqah)". The notion of the manifestation of the deity's power was an important part of their everyday religious practice.

== Structure ==
Alongside ZI 11, only three other pre-Islamic Arabian inscriptions pertaining to creation myth are known, all of which were also found at the Awwam Temple. Structurally, the poem has twenty-three lines. It consists of a prologue and six strophes. Each strophe consists of four verses. Each strophe consists of its own rhyme and rhythm. This has been compared to early Meccan surahs, like Surah 75 and Surah 84, whose lines are typically three to six words with six changes of rhyme throughout the totality of the composition. The poetic structure of ZI 11 is not immediately visible from the inscription, which just runs as continuous text instead of being divided into lines one above the other, although each strophe opens with b-khl ("By Kahl").

== Text ==
=== Partial English translation ===
The late Yemeni academic Muṭahhar ibn ʿAlī al-Iryānī produced a partial English translation of sections of the poem. The first strophe reads:

By Kahl, on the well-built podium, ṣalal, in the centre of his temple, the Awām, where he dwells forever and appears in powerful presence, hullak, as a statue on a podium (jawb ṣalal).

The second strophe has been translated by Mohammed Maraqten:

1 By (the power of) Kahl (i.e. Almaqah), everything you created is magnificent. 2 to overthrow the East is your intention, 3 and those who did not stand on your side, 4 your enemy will bestow a sin-offering upon you.

Translation from al-Iryani of the remaining part of the poem:

He who does not declare himself as your slave, your rising in the East will destroy him. Again: He who does not surrender to your might, you will shatter him. Yours are the risings, settings, and the orbits of the heavens.

Oh Kahl, when you fought in the Yamāma, your victory was full and final.

Your power cast the enemy far away. How many powerful ones were trampled under your feet! Chase you gave to your enemies, all of them. What is above, and what is below, your might subjugates them all. – You, oh Kahl, when you rose in the East (daraḥ), from the night, you who drives away the darkness, when you helped Saba's army and supported it through your glorious rising. Your light was their protection when they were in the desert. – Through your rising and the rising of your light came your victory (yā man bi-ṭulū'i-hī wa-išrāq nūri-hī).

Oh Kahl, on this day, your rule (mulk) is proclaimed, and the glory of your forces is celebrated.

On the day of victory, your reign, oh Kahl, is established in the high. Every catastrophe you warded away.

It was night when the army travelled when the sun set down. Then, when things were hopeless, they implored your aid, and you made your appearance in the East, in shining divine light.

Kahl crosses the lands in powerful stride, reaching his destination before the morning light became visible.

Through you, oh Kahl, the battle at Fīf was won when you shone in the East. You sent the leader, victorious in the night, to our armies and gave the victory.

=== Transcription ===
The standard transcription of ZI 11 is that of Al-Iryani.

== See also ==
- Pre-Islamic Arabian inscriptions
