= Rahmanan =

Epithet for a monotheistic god in South Arabia

Raḥmānān (Musnad: 𐩧𐩢𐩣𐩬𐩬 rḥmnn, "the Merciful") was an epithet and theonym predominantly used to refer to a singular, monotheistic God from the fourth to sixth centuries in South Arabia (though the term originates much earlier in Syria), beginning when the ruling class of the Himyarite Kingdom converted to Judaism and replacing invocations to polytheistic religions. The term may have also been monolatrous until the arrival of Christianity in the mid-sixth century.

During the reign of the Christian Himyarite king Sumyafa Ashwa, Jesus was referred to as the son of Raḥmānān. A few decades later, during the reign of Abraha, Jesus was also described as the Messiah of Raḥmānān.

== Etymology ==
The root r-ḥ-m and its derivative words, originally referring not to a deity but just the notion of mercy, appears in Akkadian (sometimes an epithet for the god Ninurta), Hebrew (occurring in the Hebrew Bible), Old Aramaic (especially as an epithet for the Mesopotamian god Hadad), in addition to many other dialects of post-biblical Aramaic including Samaritan Aramaic, Christian Palestinian Aramaic, Palmyrene Aramaic, the Aramaic dialects of the Babylonian Talmud and the Palestinian Talmud (as the term appears in these texts too), and Syriac. It can be shown that Syriac was not the dialect of Aramaic through which the root reached South Arabia.

The South Arabian root is currently considered a loan from Jewish Aramaic. The form Rahmanan, as it appears in the South Arabian language known as Sabaic, is also widely agreed to be the source of the Arabic form al-Raḥmān, especially as both forms use the definite article (al- in Arabic, -an in Sabaic). Both therefore translate to "The Merciful".

== History ==
=== Ancient Syria and Mesopotamia ===
The earliest known usage of the term is found in a polytheistic bilingual inscription from northeastern Syria written in Akkadian and Aramaic dedicated to the Aramean god Hadad. In Aramaic, it reads: ‘lh. rḥmn zy. tṣlwth. ṭbh; "merciful god to whom prayer is sweet." The Akkadian version uses the form rēmēnȗ in the place of rḥmn, a title that was also used as an epithet for Marduk. Worship of the "Merciful One" (rḥmnn), under Mesopotamian cultural influence, became widespread in Syria in the first centuries AD.

=== Himyarite Kingdom ===
When the ruling class of Himyar converted to Judaism in the fourth century, public inscriptions began to only mention one singular god. The name of this singular god, from the mid-5th century onwards, is Raḥmānān, "The Merciful". The South Arabian high god Rahmanan may have evolved from Kahl, who had already gradually begun assimilating monotheistic characteristics between the 1st and 3rd centuries, partly attested in the 3rd-century Sabaic poem Zaid Inan 11. Rahmanan's new role as the sole deity of Himyar is attested in several inscriptions:

Ry 515: By the Merciful, Lord of the Jews

Ry 520: 4 ... For their Lord / 5 the Merciful, Master of Heaven, so that he grant to him and his spouses / 6 and to his children, the Merciful, to live a life of justice, and to / 7 die a death of justice. And that the Merciful grant to him children / 8 who are healthy who will fight for the name of the Merciful...

Rahmanan received epithets like "Lord of the Jews", "Lord of Heaven", "Masters of Heaven and Earth", and is often also associated with people who have biblical names. People prayed to Rahmanan for a just life, children, and to have their prayers answered. After the Himyarite Kingdom fell to the Christian Kingdom of Aksum, Rahmanan continued to be used as the name for the monotheistic God in Christian inscriptions, sometimes in a Trinitarian context, such as in Ry 506, the Marib Dam inscription (CIH 541), and the Jabal Dabub inscription. The Jabal Dabub inscription, in particular, attests a pre-Islamic version of the Basmala.

Two names of God are used in the inscriptions Ja 1028 and Ry 515: Rb-hwd b-Rḥmnn, 'Lord of the Jews by/with Rahmanan', and Rb-hd b-Mḥmd: 'Lord of Jews by / with the Praised'. They are connected by the preposition b-, implying that the two gods are one entity. The two deities may have been distinguished, or syncretized. Evidence from another inscription, CIH 543, may suggest that the two are separate entities. According to this interpretation, Himyar practiced monolatry, and distinguished their own high god (Rahmanan) from the high god of Israel. One hypothesis holds that local Jews would have equated Rahmanan with the biblical God, whereas immigrant Jews would have seen Rahmanan as a local god to be invoked alongside the God of Israel. After the conquest of Himyar by the Kingdom of Aksum, the term was solely used to refer to the one biblical God.

Rahmanan is mentioned 58 times in surviving Late Sabaic inscriptions, none of which have evidence of being pagan or polytheistic. Himyaritic epigraphy also sometimes uses the term synonymously with ʾl and ʾlh. The phrase al-Raḥmān appears in putative pre-Islamic poetry as a synonym with Allāh, but it is unclear if these appearances represent later Islamicization.

=== Aksumite kingdom ===
Around 530 AD, South Arabia fell under the rule of the Christian Aksumite Kingdom. During this period, the name Raḥmānān begins to be used in Christian inscriptions, especially as a component of Trinitarian formulas.

=== Quran ===
The Quran frequently uses the term al-Raḥmān to refer to "the Merciful One". The entry of the term al-Raḥmān into Old Arabic likely predates the Quran, as there is at least some pre-Islamic poetry using the phrase that appears to be authentic. Although Rahmanan was once its own name for the deity in South Arabia, and is sometimes used as such in the Quran, by its final redaction it had become an adjective modifying the word "God" as "the merciful".

The lengthier Quranic phrase al-rahman al-rahim ("The Merciful, the Compassionate") is likely related to Himyaritic inscriptions referring to rahmanan metrahim (with the same meaning). One example may be found in the Jabal Dabub inscription, which opens with reads "in the name of Allah, al-Rahman, al-Rahim, Lord of the heavens".

=== Islamic era ===
Tradition holds that during negotiations for the Treaty of al-Hudaybiya between Muhammad (representing the state of Medina) and the Quraysh (representing Mecca), the Qurayshi emissary Suhayl ibn Amr demanded that Muhammad remove the oath "in the name of God, al-Raḥmān al-Raḥīm" from the written agreement, as for him, it would have represented an acquiescence to monotheistic practice. In its place, Suhayl said that simply "in the name of God" be used instead, representing a generic oath for the highest god that was still compatible with notions of practice that were not strictly monotheistic. Though his followers objected, Muhammad agreed to the compromise.

== See also ==
- List of pre-Islamic Arabian deities
- Monotheism in pre-Islamic Arabia
