= Qaryat al-Faw =

Ancient Arabian capital and modern village

The Cultural Landscape of Al-Faw Archaeological Area
UNESCO World Heritage Site
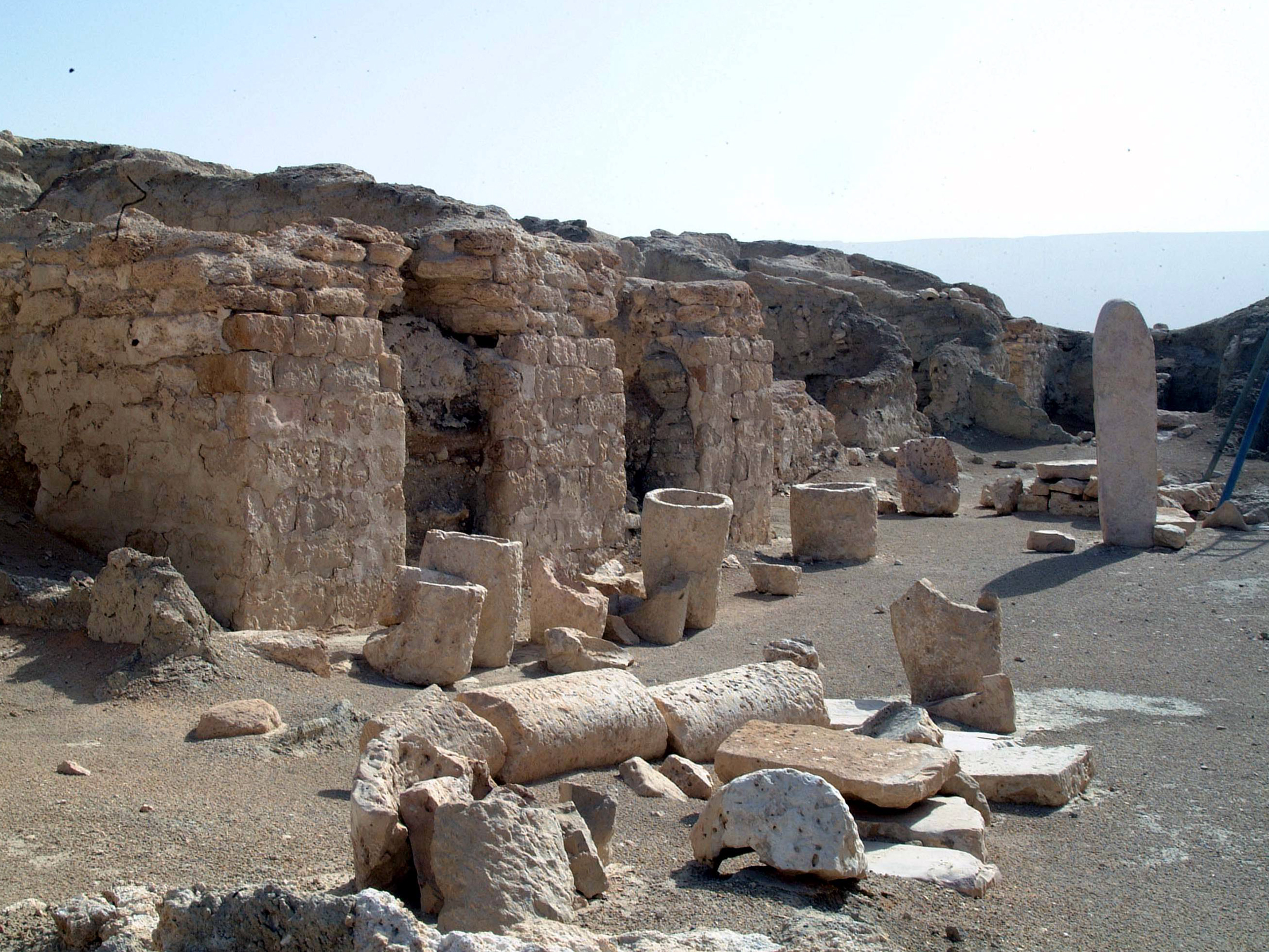
- The Surviving Remains of the Qaryat Al-Faw Market.

- Location within Saudi Arabia Location within West and Central Asia
- Location: Saudi Arabia
- Criteria: Cultural: (ii), (v)
- Reference: 1712
- Inscription: 2024 (46th Session)
- Area: 4,847.73 ha (11,979.0 acres)
- Buffer zone: 27,548.33 ha (68,073.4 acres)
- Coordinates: 19°45′53.7″N 45°09′48.2″E

Qaryat Al Faw (Arabic: قرية الفاو), also known as Qaryat Dhat Kahil, was once the capital of the Kingdom of Kinda, now an archaeological site. It is located about 100 km south of Wadi ad-Dawasir, and about 700 km southwest of Riyadh, the capital city of Saudi Arabia. The archeological site reveals various features such as residential houses, markets, roads, cemeteries, temples, and water wells.

The tutelary deity of Qaryat al-Faw is thought to have been Kahl. The pantheon of the city also included other deities, such as Shams.

Other names for the site include Qaryat al-Hamraa (Red City) and Dhat al-Jnan (City of Gardens) by the inhabitants in its period of prosperity.

In July 2024, Qaryat Al-Faw was officially designated as a UNESCO World Heritage Site.

== Geography ==
Al Faw village is located on the northwestern border of the Empty Quarter, thus, it is located on the trade route that connects the south of the Arabian Peninsula with its north-east. Al Faw was an important trade hub and had more than seventeen water wells.

== History ==
The city emerged in the fourth century BC, and flourished from the 3rd century BC until the 3rd century AD. During the period from the 1st to 3rd centuries, suzerainty over the region was exercised by Himyar. The Kinda abandoned it around 300 AD to settle in Hadhramaut. Shortly afterwards, it was abandoned.

The city has long been a site of warfare. The Namara inscription mentions an expedition led by Imru al-Qays ibn Amr into Najran where he reached Qaryat al-Faw and drove the ruling tribe of Madh'hij from the city.

== Religion ==
Kahl was the main deity worshiped by the Arab tribes of Kindah and Madh'hij.

== Hellenization ==
Recent archaeological work at Qaryat al-Faw shows that the site was strongly integrated into the Hellenistic period and late antique cultural world, though its Hellenization was selective and mediated primarily through Egypt rather than directly from the Roman Near East. A temple of the sun god Shams has been found, containing a mrzḥ, a ritual banqueting institution that had absorbed Hellenistic forms such as the symposium by the Roman period. The mrzḥ at Qaryat al-Faq is also the easternmost epigraphically attested mrzḥ, demonstrating that Hellenized cult practices extended deep into central Arabia.

The frescoes decorating the mrzḥ clearly reflect a process of Hellenization. Their iconography (including reclining banqueters, vine scrolls, erotes, amphorae, chariots, and Roman dress) belongs to a shared Mediterranean visual repertoire. Stylistic analysis finds close parallels with Egyptian Fayum mummy portraits, including hierarchical scaling of figures, vegetal wreaths rendered as dotted halos, pink rose garlands associated with funerary rites, and symbolic fruits linked to regeneration and the afterlife. These motifs align with the function of the mrzḥ as a funerary banqueting space and reflect a Hellenized funerary ideology expressed through Egyptian visual language.

== Mural paintings ==
Qaryat al-Faw reveals a long-established tradition of mural painting, evidenced by numerous fresco fragments uncovered at the site. These paintings range from highly elaborate compositions, reminiscent of the Roman tradition of wall painting that spread across the ancient world, to simpler, more schematic designs characterised by basic line work and geometric motifs. The artistic approach demonstrates a clear tendency towards naturalism and perspective, particularly in the more refined examples, while others maintain a more stylised and symbolic aesthetic. The colour palette remained relatively restrained, with dominant hues of white, ochre, red, and black, and in a few cases, the rare incorporation of blue.

Perhaps the most famous fresco from Qaryat al-Faw is the one identified by an inscription reading ‘zky,’ (“pious, blessed”), probably a benediction more than a name. According to Juan de Lara, these are likely dated to the first century CE, and the iconography reveals that the artist may have been trained in the painting workshops of the Roman empire, specifically Egypt. This fragment belongs to a larger decorative scheme that once adorned a single room within the Temple of Shams, suggesting that the interior of the sanctuary was extensively painted. The frescoes depict a variety of subjects, including human figures, camel drivers, and mythological motifs, all framed within cartouches intertwined with vines and grape clusters. The stylistic characteristics of these paintings closely resemble those found in Roman mural art, particularly in sites such as El Djem in Tunisia, which date to the first/second century CE.

== Archaeology ==
=== Description ===
The site of Qaryat al-Faw was not fortified, but it was surrounded by extensive walls. The construction of the city was apparently well-planned out, being divided into individual quarters (where the royal palace, temple, and residential areas have been found). Water entered into the city via canals and cisterns that also appear to have been planned out. Five temples have been discovered, each dating to different periods and dedicated to different deities. For example, the Temple of Wadd was a rectangular building made with limestone ashlars and was placed in the center of the city, along with the palace and a fortified castle called a suq. It had rectangular dimension of 30.75 x 25.20 m with corner and interval towers. The outer walls of the castle were made of stone ashlar, and mud bricks covered its inside and outside. The palace region includes two buildings, each with two stone columns in the center providing support for its roof. In these buildings, benches have been found along the walls, indicating that they were a place of reception or assembly of people. Many frescoes have also been found in the palace region. The city included a burial place for its kings and nobility; this occurred in stone-built chambers and a mauseoleum or a tower placed on top of it. A bust of Artemis has been found in this area.

=== Interest and excavations ===
Interest in Qaryat al-Fāw as an archaeological site dates back to the 1940s when it was referenced by some workers of the Saudi Aramco oil company. In 1952, three of the company's staff visited the city and wrote about it. In 1996, the village was visited by an expert from the Antiquities and Museums agency. In 1976, it was visited first by the History and Antiquities Association of King Saud University in Riyadh and then by the Department of Antiquities and Museums, both aiming to study the site, and more specifically, to identify the location of the city. The work took place between 1972 and 1995. Archaeological excavations were carried out by a team from King Saud University team, from 1970 to 2003, and uncovered two major sectors of the town. The first was a residential area, consisting of houses, squares, streets and a market place, while the second was a sacred area, consisting of temples and tombs. The general architectural plan is very indicative of pre-Islamic towns in Arabia.

=== Current Condition ===
As of January 1, 2014, the site is completely fenced for protection against looters by the Saudi Government. The site is tended by a Saudi caretaker whose family has ties to the immediate area. The site was authorized and allocated funds for significant improvement, preservation and the construction of a modern visitors center. Construction was to have been completed by December, 2013, however to date no construction has started. The site is extremely impressive, with multiple Nobelmans and Warrior class tombs spaced along the Eastern periphery. The Kings tomb resides somewhat separated and to the North West of the City. The market place shows significant erosion of the walls, which have buried almost an entire story of the once 3 or 4 level artifice. Remnants of grain storage and baking ovens can still be seen today. Located East of the city lies a large jebel, with significant caves and petroglyphs.

== UNESCO World Heritage site ==
On July 27, 2024, the Kingdom of Saudi Arabia succeeded in inscribing "The Cultural Landscape of Al-Faw Archaeological Area" in the Riyadh region on UNESCO's World Heritage List as a cultural site of exceptional global value for human heritage.

== Gallery ==
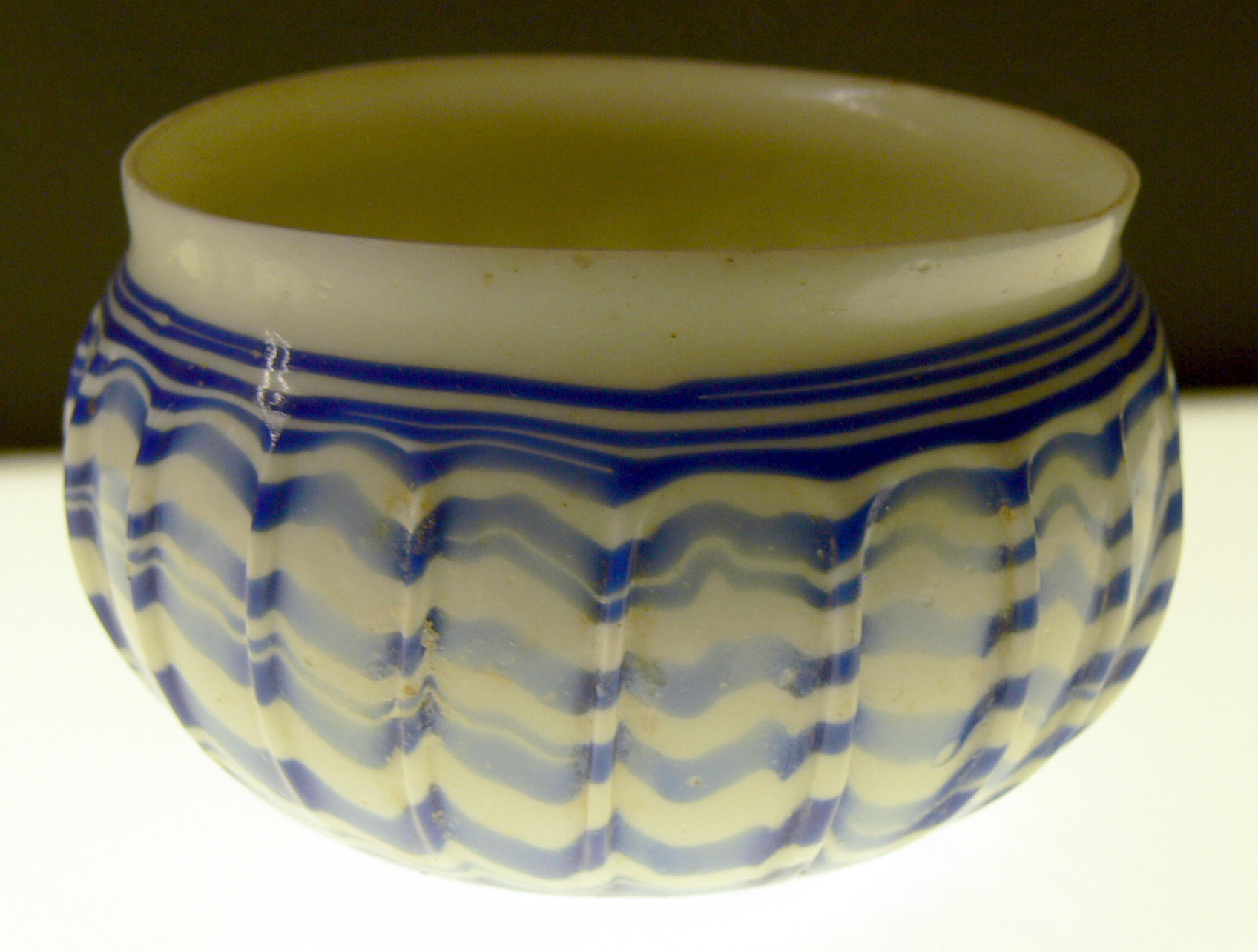
Old hollow glass container back to the 1st century BC was found in the Al Faw village

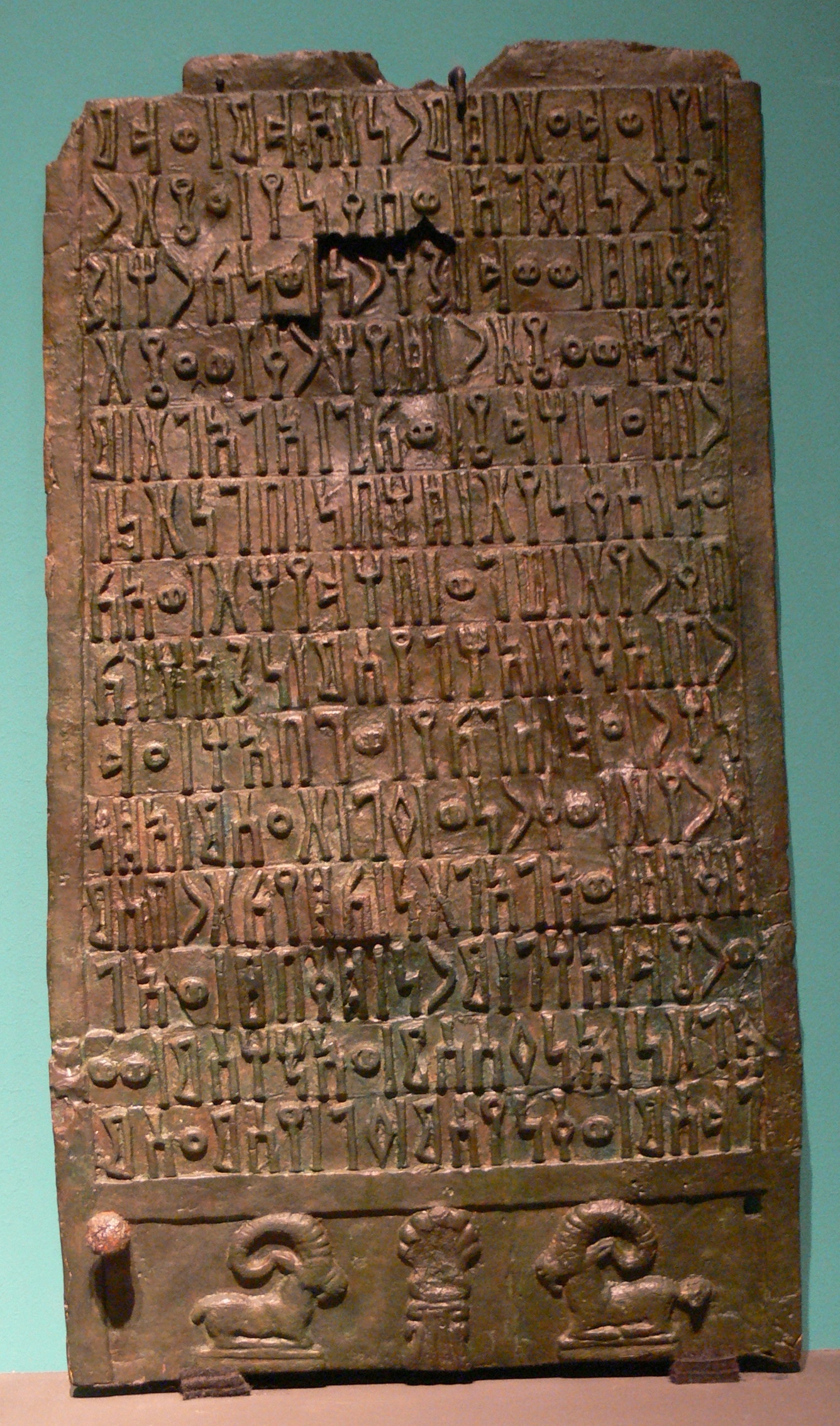
Plaque with a Ma'inic inscription and two ibexes (1st century BC - 1st century AD)

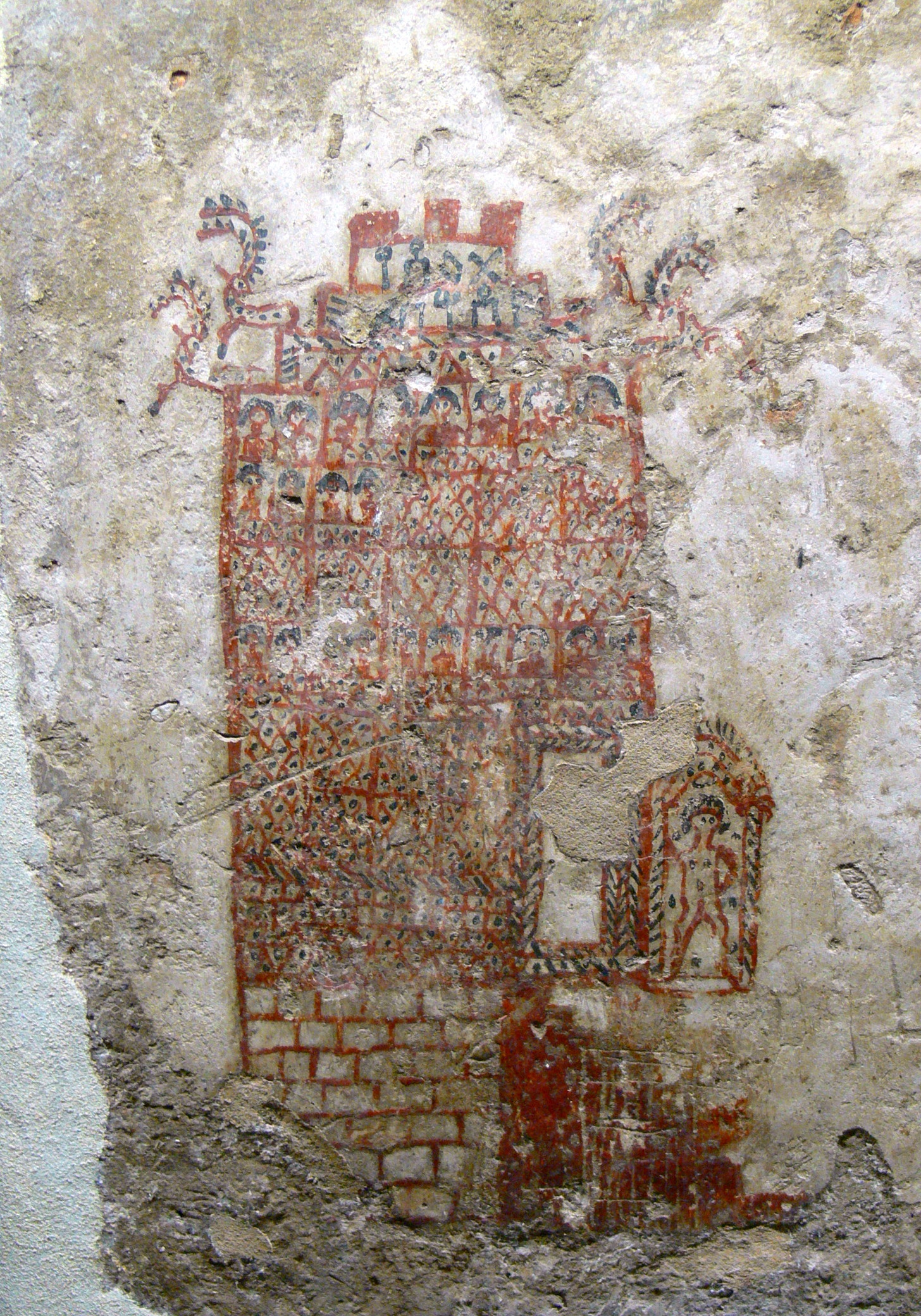
Fragment of a wall painting depicting a tower house with inhabitants (3rd century BC - 3rd century AD)

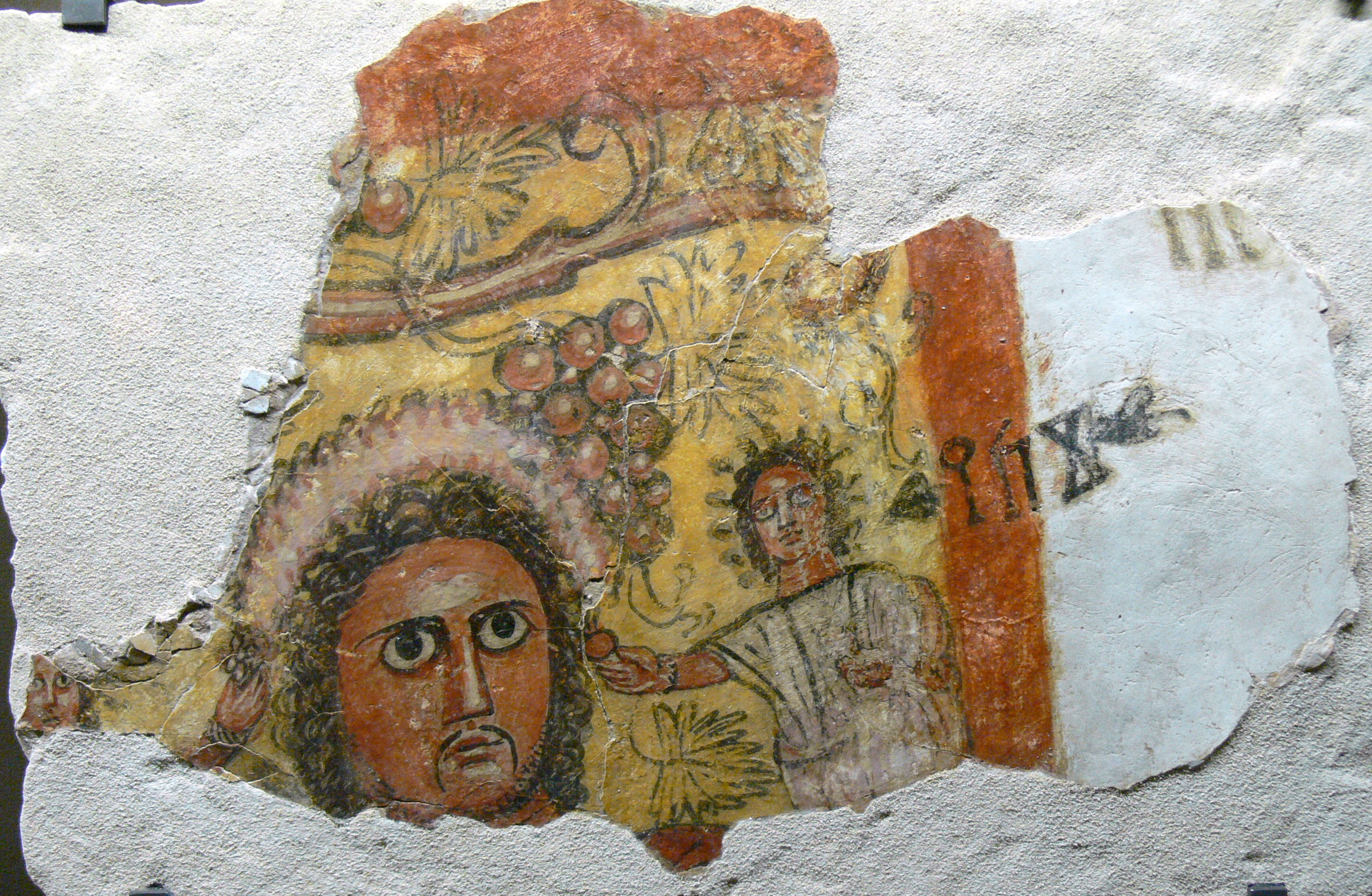
Fragment of a wall painting with a man's head and an Old South Arabian inscription, probably a banquet scene (1st/2nd century AD)

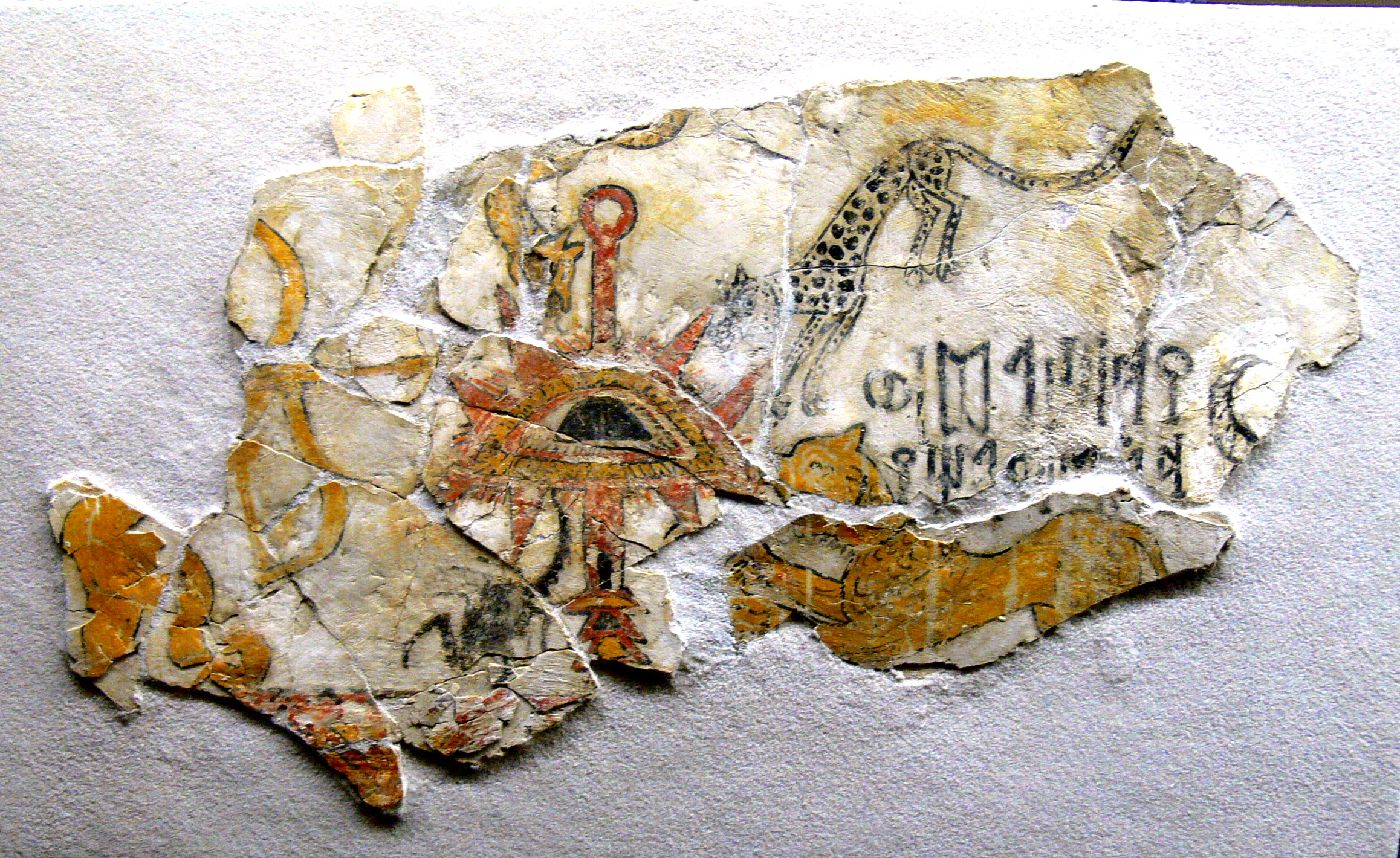
Fragment of a mural painting with zodiacal motif (1st-3rd century AD)

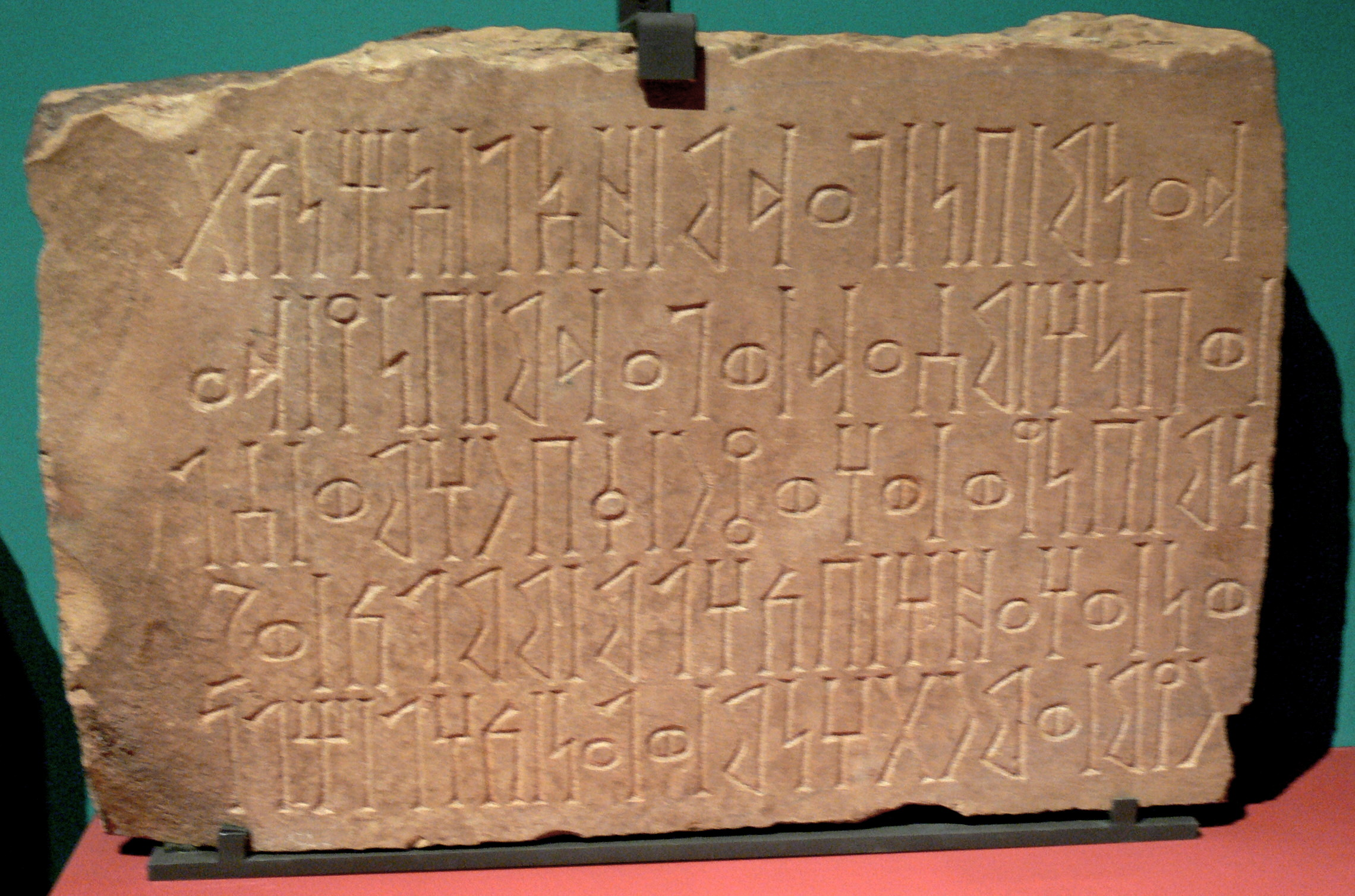
Stone plaque with Sabaean donation inscription for a mausoleum (1st century BC)

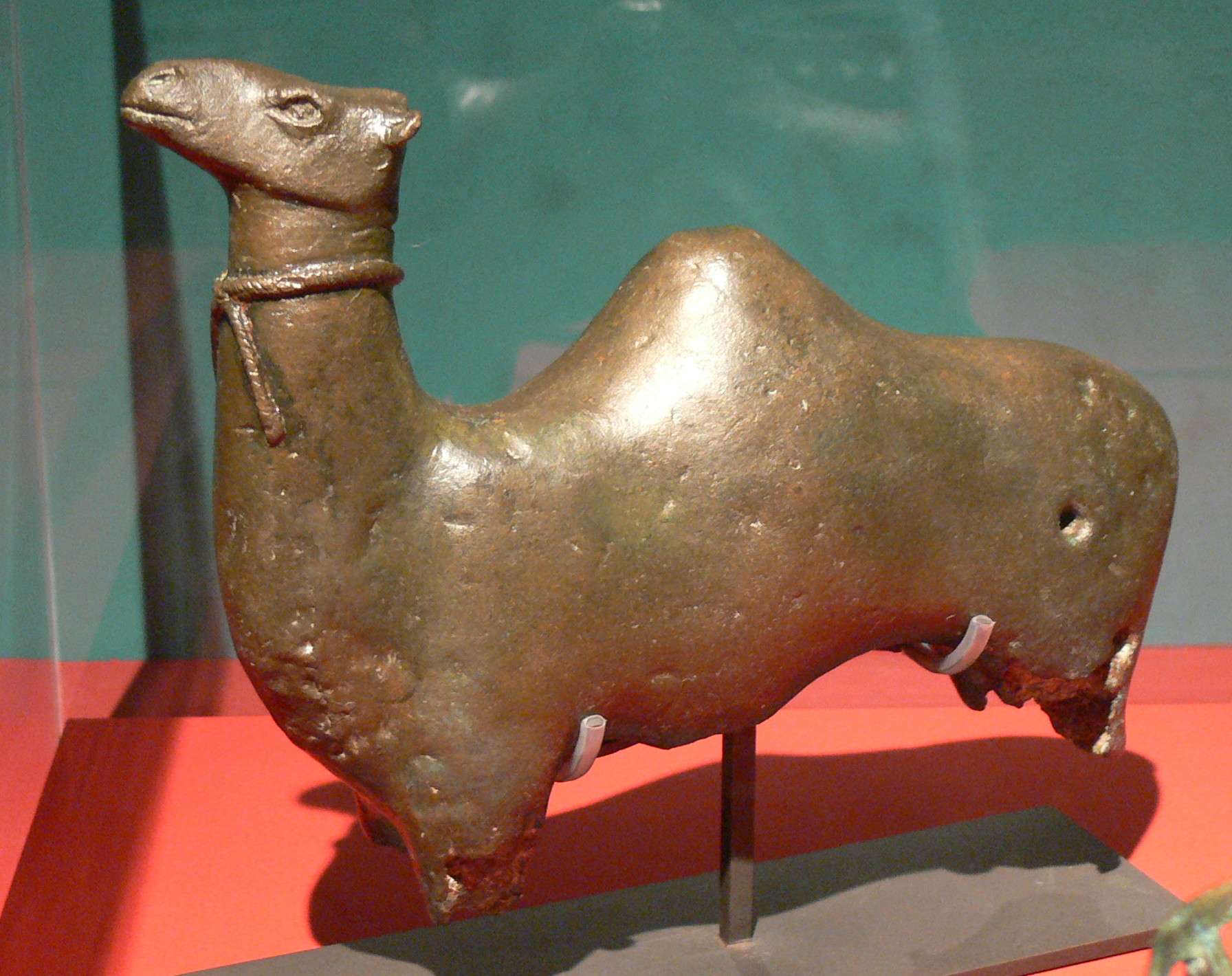
Statue of a dromedary (2nd century BC - 2nd century AD)

== Sources ==
- Finster, Barbara (2017). "The Material Culture of Pre- and Early Islamic Arabia". In Flood, Finbarr Barry; Necipoğlu, Gülru (eds.). A Companion to Islamic Art and Architecture. John Wiley & Sons. pp. 61–88. doi:10.1002/9781119069218.ch2. ISBN 978-1-119-06866-2.
