= Kahl (god) =

Arabian god

- Tutelary deity of Qaryat al-Faw, possibly a solar deity
- Other names: khl, kāhil, kuhūl, kāhal
- Major cult center: Qaryat al-Faw
- Successor: Possibly evolved into Rahmanan
- Region: Pre-Islamic Arabia
- Ethnic group: Sabaeans

Kahl is a god of pre-Islamic Arabia. He was the chief god (tutelary deity) of the city of Qaryat al-Faw, the capital of the Kingdom of Kinda, beginning in the 2nd century BC. Kahl is attested regularly, but the evidence is more sparse with respect to how Kahl was understood. Based on recent evidence, Juan de Lara belives that Kahl could be an Arabian version of the smiting or menacing god that is known in the regions of the Eastern Mediterranean and West Asia. Kahl may have evolved into the god Rahmanan in the trend towards the evolution of pre-Islamic monotheism.

== Name ==
In Ancient South Arabian texts, his name is rendered as khl. Due to the absence of information about how the name of this god is pronounced, his name has been transcribed in many ways in studies, including as kahl, kāhil, kuhūl and kāhal. Sometimes, it takes the grammatical form khlm (Kāhilim).

In one Sabaic dictionary, the Sabäisches Wörterbuch, khl means 'ruler', or 'powerful'. Generally, it is a Semitic root that denotes an power or coming of age. Elsewhere, khl also occurs as a personal name and as the name of some places.

== Qaryat al-Faw ==
Kahl was one of, if not the principal tutelary deity of city of Qaryat al-Faw, the capital of the Kingdom of Kinda.

Kahl becomes a prominent god in this place in the 2nd century BC, and the city goes on to become the primarily associated with the worship of Kahl. Out of all the names the place went by, Qaryatum dhāt Kāhilim, or "the City [of the god] Kahl" was most common. Kahl himself is regularly called khlm bʿl qrytm, or "Kāhlum, the Lord of Qarytum", reflecting the relationship between him and the city. From the 2nd century BC until the 1st century AD, Kahl appears on many coins from this site where the letters of the name are combined into a single artistic unit (a monogram). These coins can contain text that refers to Kahl as "Lord Kahl" (Baʿl Kahl). The coins, in addition to some figurines and rock carvings, present a consistent anthropomorphic image that has been speculatively connected with Kahl: this image shows a standing figure with his right arm holding a weapon, perhaps a club, over his right shoulder, and with a protruding left arm. This is consistent with notions and poses of the smiting god or menacing god known from West Asian and East Mediterranean deities, such as Resheph.

== Marib ==
Kahl is mentioned along with the god Almaqah in a few inscriptions near the city Marib around the area of the Awwam Temple, including ZI 11 and Sh 31/33 where Kahl may occupy connotations of a solar deity. The latter reads:

b‐ʾlmqhw bʿl ʾwm w‐b‐rbʿ‐hmw rmn w‐b‐šms‐hmw khlm w‐bʿlt nʿmn (‘with [the help of] ʾAlmaqah, the Lord [of the Temple] ʾAwwām, and with [the help of] their patron god Rummān, and with the help of their [sun goddess/angel] Kāhlum and the mistress [of the Temple] Nuʿmān’)

One inscription (Zaid Inan 11) uses "Kahl" and "Almaqah" as epithets for the same god. This inscription, a long Sabaic poem from the third century AD, shows Kahl leading an army of Sabaeans into Al-Yamama (then called al-Jaww), a region that he pierces and conquers in a triumphant victory. According to the inscription, this campaign is part of Kahl's "rising in the East" (meaning to overcome the night). The poem also reveals a development in pre-Islamic religion as Kahl absorbs the properties and functions of several deities that had come before him in the pantheon. According to some historians, this represents an ongoing trend in South Arabian religion at the time towards the emergence of pre-Islamic Arabian monotheism. The second step of this process may have been the transformation of Kahl into Rahmanan before the reigns of the kings Malkikarib Yuhamin and Abu Karib.

== See also ==
- List of pre-Islamic Arabian deities
- Pre-Islamic Arabian inscriptions
- Shams (deity)
