= Kingdom of Kinda =

Ancient Arabian polity

Kingdom of Kinda كِنْدَة الملوك
- c. 450 CE–c. 550 CE
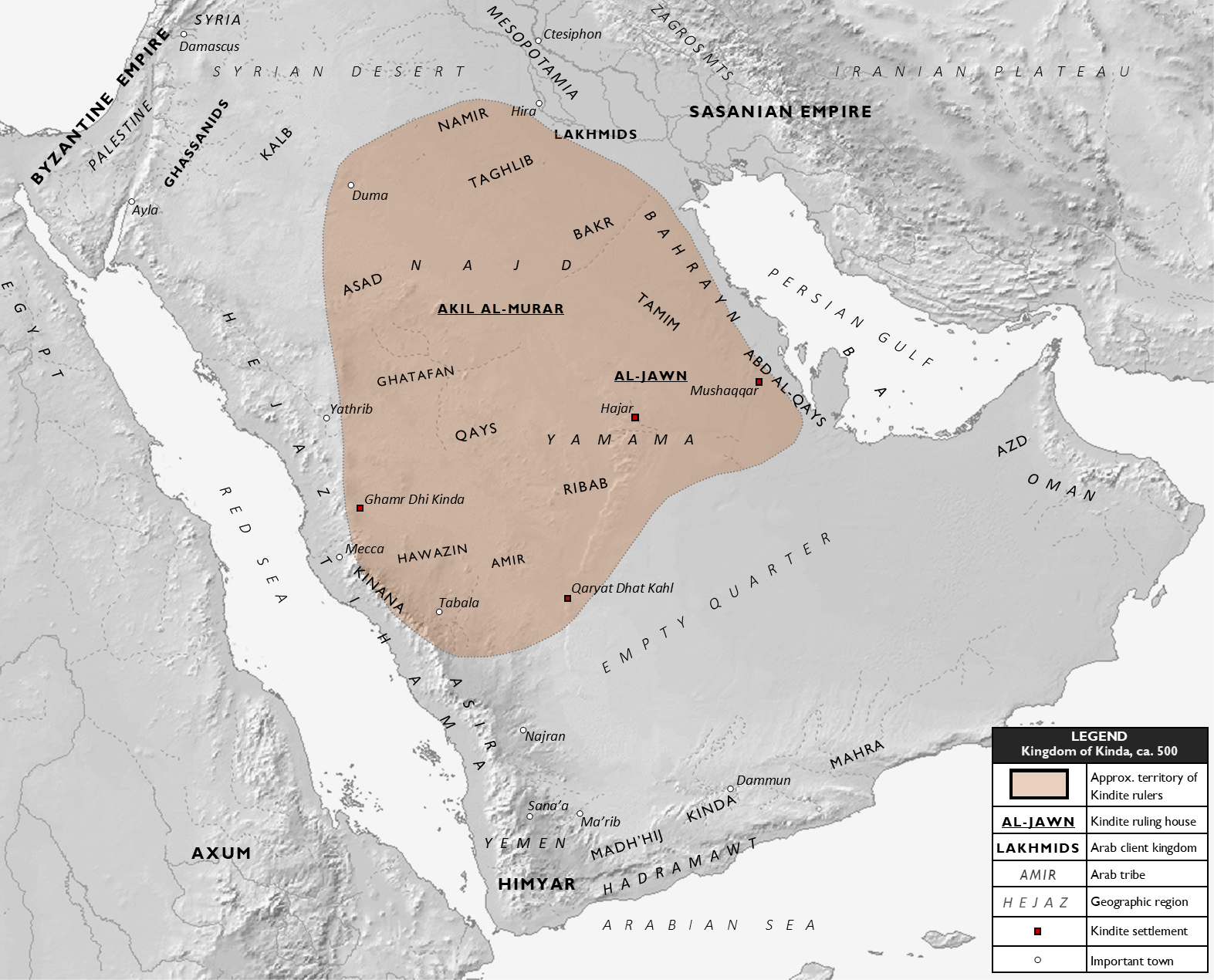
- Map showing approximate extent of the Kingdom of Kinda, c. 500 CE
- Capital: Ghamr Dhi Kinda; Batn Aqil; Qaryat al-Faw; Hajar; al-Mushaqqar
- Common languages: Arabic
- Religion: Christianity, Arabian polytheism Mazdakism
- Demonym: Kindites
- Government: Monarchy
- History
  - Established: c. 450 CE
  - Disestablished: c. 550 CE
- Today part of: Saudi Arabia

The Kingdom of Kinda (Arabic: كِنْدَة الملوك, romanized: Kindat al-Mulūk, lit. 'Royal Kinda') also called the Kindite kingdom, refers to the rule of the nomadic Arab tribes of the Ma'add confederation in north and central Arabia by the Hujrid dynasty (in Arabic tradition, called the Banu Akil al-Murar), a family of the South Arabian tribe of Kinda, in c. 450 CE – c. 550 CE. The Kinda did not belong to the Ma'add and their rule over them was likely at the confederation's initiative and engineered by the Kinda's South Arabian patron, the Himyarite Kingdom. The tribes may have sought a prominent, non-involved leader to bring stability to the Ma'add during a period of constant feuding among its constituents.

The roughly century-long rule of the Kinda was the first known nomadic Arab monarchy and the first attempt by the tribes to regulate their affairs in a centralized manner. The Kindite kingdom presaged the centralization movement under Islam in the early 7th century. Likely influenced by the sedentary civilization of Himyar, the Kindite monarchs ruled their domains from urban settlements. The rule of the kingdom's founder Hujr Akil al-Murar was characterized by domestic peace. He was succeeded by his sons Amr al-Maqsur and Mu'awiya al-Jawn, who ruled over Najd and the Yamama, respectively. The tribes of the Rabi'a faction revolted and likely killed Amr. His son and successor al-Harith is the first Kindite king attested in contemporary Byzantine sources. His sons' assaults on the Byzantine frontier provinces in the Levant likely precipitated the Byzantines' establishment of an alliance with the Kinda to serve as tribal federates of the empire, alongside the Ghassanids, in 502.

After al-Harith's death, his four sons, each ruling over a different grouping of tribes within the Ma'add confederation, became absorbed in their constituents' blood feuds, greatly weakening the kingdom in Najd. The Kindite kings in the Yamama similarly became entangled in conflicts between their subject tribes. Several Kindite kings in Najd and the Yamama were slain in the internecine fighting. The heavy losses and their fraying control over the tribes prompted the Kinda's abandonment of their kingdom and return to the Hadramawt. There, many of their tribesmen had remained and controlled parts of the region. Several Kindites attained power and influence in the Caliphate, the Islamic empire established after the Islamic prophet Muhammad's death in 632. However, these Kindites hailed from different branches of the tribe, the Banu Akil al-Murar having lost their leadership role.

== History ==
=== Establishment ===
Family tree of the Banu Akil al-Murar, the Kindite ruling house of the Ma'add confederation in central Arabia and its constituent tribes between c. 450 and c. 550.

The Kinda tribe originally had their abode in South Arabia, possibly in Hadramawt, where they served as nomad auxiliaries for the armies of the Sabaean and Himyarite kings. Himyar gained full control over Saba and the other South Arabian kingdoms in the late 3rd century CE. By at least the mid-4th century they were launching campaigns into central, eastern and northeastern Arabia against the tribes or confederations of Ma'add, Iyad, Murad and Abd al-Qays. An inscription from the late 5th century mentions that the Himyarite king Abikarib As'ad traveled to the "land of Ma'add on the occasion of the establishment of certain of their tribes". The medieval Arabic literary works of al-Isfahani and Ibn Habib similarly mention that Abikarib campaigned in central Arabia and established the Kindite chief Hujr over Ma'add. In this respect, the Kinda's relationship with Himyar are comparable to the Arab client kingdoms of the Sasanian and Byzantine empires, namely the Lakhmids of lower Mesopotamia and the Ghassanids of the Syrian steppe, respectively. All three Arab kingdoms vied with each other for preeminence in northern Arabia.

Medieval Arabic literature indicates the subordination of the nomadic tribes of the Ma'add to Kindite rule was the initiative of the Ma'add, especially its Bakr ibn Wa'il division, to bring order to its constantly feuding constituent tribes. Accordingly, the Bakr sent envoys to the king of Himyar, inviting him to be their king. Instead, the king delegated the role to Hujr for unclear reasons. The historian Mohammed A. Bamyeh proposes that the sedentary Himyarite king, not wanting the burden of directly ruling the warring nomadic tribes of the vast desert expanses, resolved to have his dependent, the nomadic Kindite Hujr, effectively rule on Himyar's behalf. Himyarite attempts to extend their commercial interests into the region may have been related to the introduction of Kindite rule, though Bamyeh holds there is scant evidence such economic designs ever took shape. Rather than an economic arrangement, the Kindite leadership of Ma'add was a political pact between the warring tribes on the one hand and the Himyar-sponsored Kinda on the other. Contributing factors to the Kinda's leadership were the tribe's hitherto neutrality in the inter-tribal feuds of Arabia and their significant numbers, which could bolster their kingship in the expansive region of northern and central Arabia.

Hujr became the founder of the Kinda's royal household, the Banu Akil al-Murar, so-called after Hujr's nickname Akil al-Murar (lit. 'the one who eats bitter herbs'). In an inscription in South Arabian script, he styled himself "king of Kinda". While the house of Akil al-Murar stemmed from the Banu Mu'awiya, one of the three main divisions of the Kinda, most of the tribesmen who accompanied him belonged to the Sakun division.

Hujr died of old age in the Kindite settlement of Batn Aqil, after a lengthy, stable reign, according to the Arabic sources. His eldest son, Amr al-Maqsur, succeeded his father as head of the Ma'add in the Najd (northern central Arabia), while his younger son Mu'awiya al-Jawn, founder of the Banu al-Jawn house, ruled over the confederation in the Yamama (southern central Arabia).

Amr was known as al-Maqsur ('the limited one') because he was not able to expand the limits of his father's domain. The Arabic traditions note that his authority was rejected by the Rabi'a tribes, which included the Bakr and Taghlib among others and whose territory was in the northern parts of Arabia leading to Mesopotamia. Around this time, in the late 5th century, the Rabi'a chief Kulayb had been launching successful assaults against the South Arabians. Amr received military support from Himyar to enforce his rule, but to no avail. His authority was likely confined to the southern parts of the Najd, closer to Himyar. Amr was killed, most likely in a battle against the Rabi'a.

=== Reign of al-Harith ===
==== Relations with the Byzantines and Sasanians ====
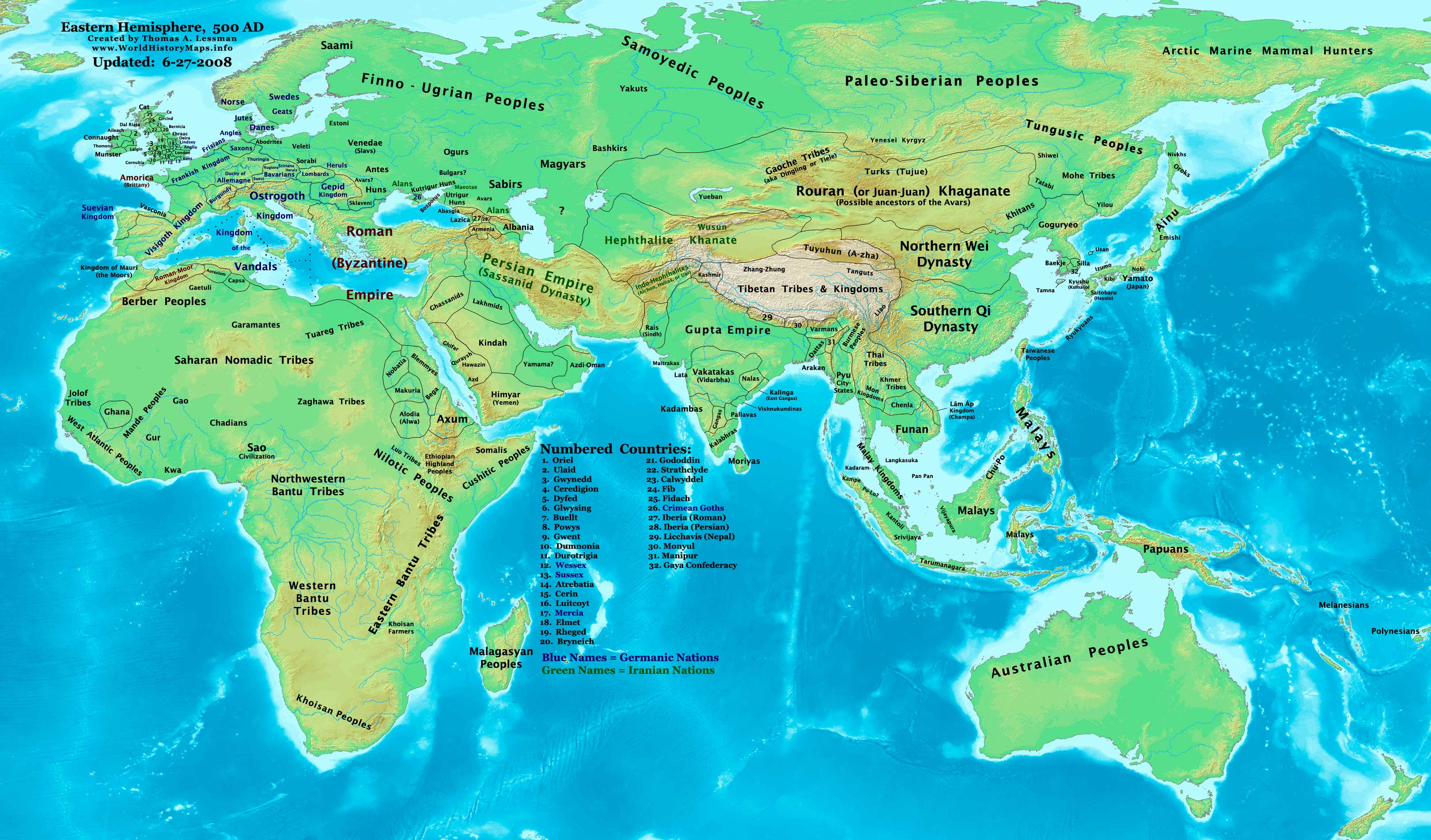
The Kingdom of Kinda and main polities in Eurasia around 500 AD

Although there are no particular achievements attributed to Hujr's sons, his grandson, al-Harith ibn Amr, became the best-known Kindite among the tribes of Arabia, as well as among the Byzantines and Sasanians, and their Ghassanid and Lakhmid clients.

As per an arrangement between the Byzantines and the Arab tribes dwelling along its Syrian Desert frontiers in 502 CE, the Kinda under al-Harith (called Arethas in the Byzantine sources) and their Ghassanid rivals had become federates of the empire. The Byzantines were prompted into this arrangement after al-Harith's sons Hujr and Ma'di-Karib launched an assault on the border region between the Byzantine Levant and Arabia. This may have been associated with the Day of al-Baradan, referred to in the Arabic sources, which was a battle most likely at a spring in the vast Samawah (the part of the Syrian Desert between Syria and southern Iraq). In that engagement the Kinda were confronted by the Salihids, the Byzantines' principal Arab federates throughout the 5th century. After initial Salihid successes, the battle turned in favor of the Kinda and the Salihid phylarch (tribal client king) Ziyad ibn al-Habula was slain. While the Arabic sources place Hujr as the head of the Kindite forces, Shahid asserts it was a likely confusion with Hujr's eponymous great-grandson Hujr ibn al-Harith, the elder Hujr having already died.

The federate agreement between Byzantium and the Kinda and the Ghassanids was significant in that it established these powerful Arab confederations as Byzantine allies, a situation which largely persisted until the Byzantines' rout by Muslim Arab armies in the Battle of Yarmouk in 636. In May 503, a likely Kindite chieftain, Asoudos (al-Aswad), led a contingent of Arabs fighting alongside the Byzantine commanders Romanus and Areobindus in a campaign against the Sasanians in Nisibis.

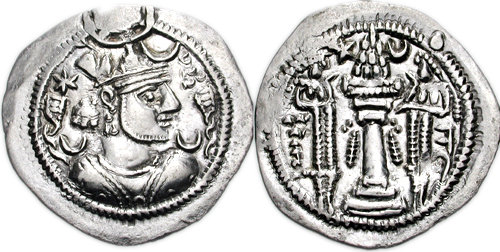
Coin of the Sasanian king Kavad I (r. 498–531), who the Kindite king al-Harith ibn Amr allied with in the late 520s

Sometime during the reign of the Sasanian king Kavad I (r. 498–531), al-Harith captured the Lakhmid capital of al-Hira in Iraq. His rule there was short-lived, but during that time he adopted the Iranian religion of Mazdakism. After his brief rulership over al-Hira he went over to the Byzantines, who granted him a phylarchate in Palestine. (Note: While the Ghassanids were allowed to live within the limes (fortifications along the Byzantine borders), it is unclear if the Kinda lived there or remained in their Arabian abodes. The historian Irfan Shahid theorizes that part of the Kinda lived in Palestine (likely Palestina Tertia, but possibly Palestina Prima as well) because they appear there in 530. Regardless of their possible establishment in Palestine at that time, they remained primarily based in Arabia.) He entered into a conflict with the dux (governor) of the province, Diomedes, prompting his flight into the Syrian Desert. There, in 528, he was slain by the Lakhmid king al-Mundhir III or the Banu Kalb tribe.

About two years after al-Harith's death the Byzantines, seeking to build an alliance against the Sasanians, dispatched envoys Julian and Nonossus to enlist Axum, Himyar, and the Kinda. Through Byzantine diplomacy, the Kindite king in Najd, Qays, likely the son of Salama ibn al-Harith, agreed to enter Byzantine service and leave his territory under the rule of his brothers Yazid and Amr. Qays went to the Byzantine capital Constantinople and was thereafter given a command in Palestine.

==== Division of the kingdom ====
Al-Harith split command of the Ma'add among four of his sons, Hujr, Ma'dikarib, Shurahbil and Salama. Olinder estimates the division occurred around the start of al-Harith's reign. It was prompted by internal strife among the tribes of Ma'add whose leaders requested the division by al-Harith, who may have also neglected his role as arbiter of disputes among his nomadic subjects.

Hujr was installed over the brother tribes of Banu Asad and Kinana from the Mudar division and whose abodes were in Jabal Shammar and the Tihama, respectively. Ma'dikarib ruled over Qays of Mudar, and whose branches were spread across northern and central Arabia. Salama led the Rabi'a tribes of Taghlib and al-Namir ibn Qasit and the Sa'd ibn Zaydmanat and Hanzala branches of the Tamim, a Mudar tribe; all of Salama's tribes dwelt in northeastern Arabia, close to the Sasanian realm. Shurahbil controlled the Bakr, sections of the Tamim, and the Ribab, all except the latter of which lived between Jabal Shammar, eastern Arabia and the Euphrates valley; the Ribab lived in the southern part of central Arabia.

=== Disintegration ===
==== Revolt against Hujr ====
The Asad bridled under Hujr's rule and may have viewed his father's death or expulsion from al-Hira as a point of weakness in Kinda's power. When Hujr dispatched tax collectors to the Asad, the tribe rejected the levy and abused the collectors. Hujr responded by launching an expedition against the Asad in which several of its men were killed and several of their chiefs, including the poet Abid al-Abrash, were captured. Hujr was afterward assassinated in his tent by an Asad tribesman.

==== Civil war between Salama and Shurahbil ====
Following al-Harith's death, relations deteriorated between Salama and Shurahbil over supremacy in the northeastern Najd where their dominions overlapped. This part of the Kindite kingdom, the closest to the Sasanian realm, had been its most important at the time, when the tribe had attempted to replace the Lakhmids in al-Hira. The Taghlib and Bakr had been engaged in a long series of blood feuds known as the Basus War. Their old enmity played a contributing role to the rivalry between Salama and Shurahbil, the kings of Taghlib and Bakr, respectively.

Al-Mundhir of al-Hira may have also induced the brothers toward war, offering gifts and honors to Salama, thereby provoking the envies and suspicions of Shurahbil. Besides seeking to neutralize the Kindites who had earlier attempted to topple his Lakhmid dynasty, al-Mundhir was also likely interested in extending his dominion over the Rabi'a tribes, which had migrated closer to his domains from central Arabia over the preceding decades.

The brothers' rivalry culminated in a battle at a desert well west of the lower Euphrates called al-Kulab. It became one of best-known battle-days of the pre-Islamic Arabs. Olinder proposes a dating of no later than a "a few years after 530". Most of the Tamim tribesmen who accompanied the Kindite kings in the confrontation melted away, leaving the Taghlib and Bakr as the main belligerents in the fighting with Salama and Shurahbil at their helm. The battle ended with Shurahbil's death and a Taghlib victory.

==== Return to Hadramawt ====
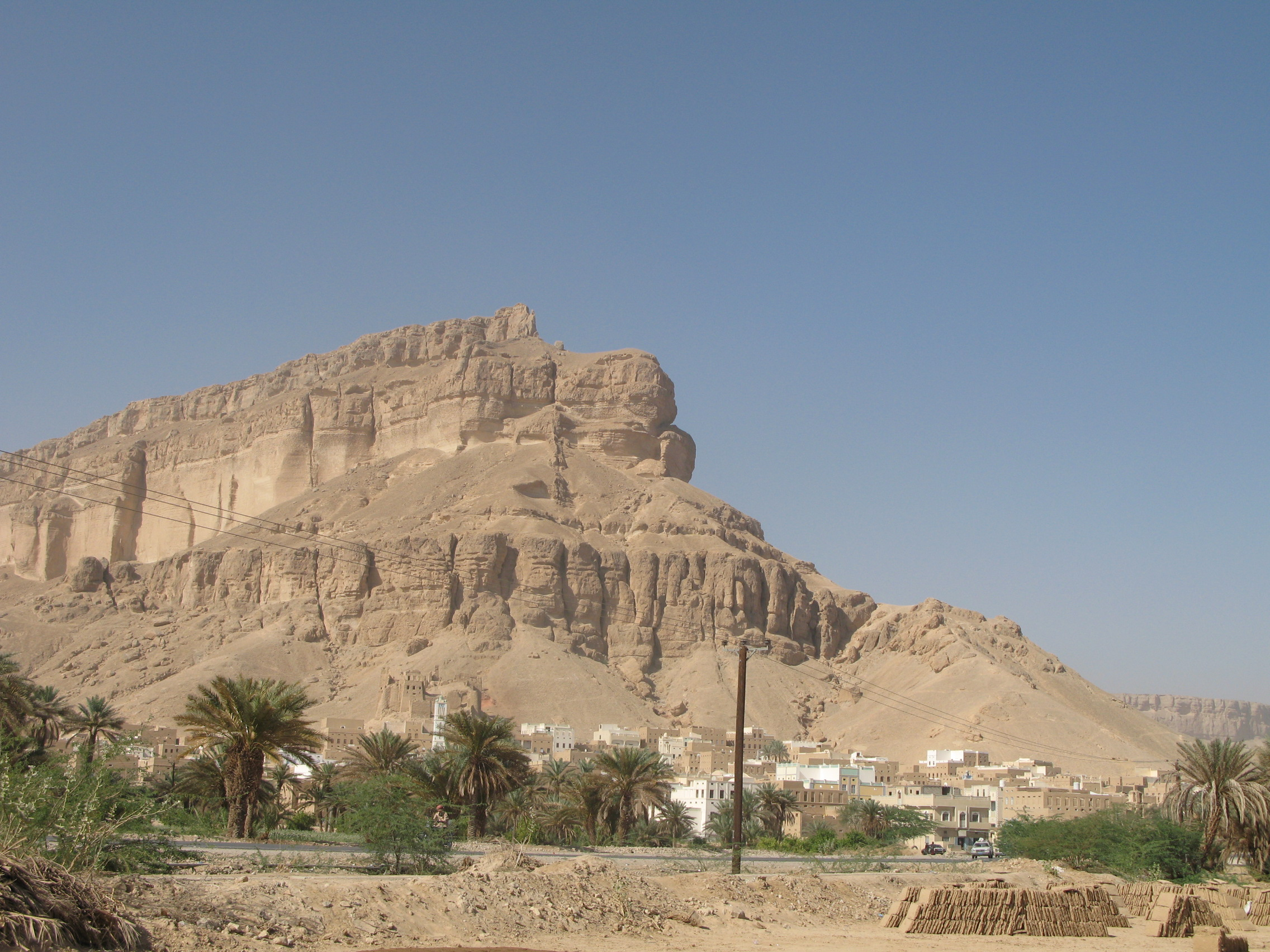
Area of Hadramawt where the Kinda tribe had long been dominant and to which the Kindite ruling family of Najd and the Yamama returned in the mid-6th century

Salama was soon after expelled by the Taghlib, who went over to al-Mundhir. He took safety with the Bakr, according to a tradition of that tribe, or may have become disabled, according to another tradition. Nothing is recorded about Ma'dikarib's career after the death of Shurahbil except that he became insane. Both brothers lost control of their tribal subjects and may have been killed at Mundhir's direction, prompting the Kinda's abandonment of the Najd for their ancestral homeland in Hadramawt. The Akil al-Murar were nearly exterminated, save for the family of Shurahbil and Hujr's daughter Hind, who were escorted safely to South Arabia.

By the late 6th century, Kindite power throughout central Arabia was fraying. The wars between al-Harith's sons had weakened them in Najd. In the Yamama, the al-Jawn became involved in a war between the Tamim and the Banu Amir, the latter a branch of the Qays. The al-Jawn dispatched contingents in support of the Tamim in their assault against the Amir in what became known as the battle of Shi'b Jabala in Najd, dated variously by modern historians to circa 550, 570 or 580. The Tamim and the Kinda and their allies, including the Lakhmids, were routed, and the leader of the al-Jawn, was slain.

Their loss at Shi'b Jabala and the following confrontation with the Amir at Dhu Nuwas especially contributed to the Kinda's abandonment of the Najd and the Yamama and return to Hadramawt. The Sasanian conquest of South Arabia possibly also played a major role. The al-Jawn of the Yamama had likely been dependent on the Sasanians across the Persian Gulf. With their influence in tatters in central Arabia, they likely saw the Sasanian conquest as an opportunity to resume their role as confederates of the Persians in their original abode where many of their tribesmen remained. The Kindite migration back to Hadramawt included some 30,000 members of the tribe departing their settlements of Ghamr Dhi Kinda in Najd and Hajar and al-Mushaqqar in the Yamama.

== Culture ==
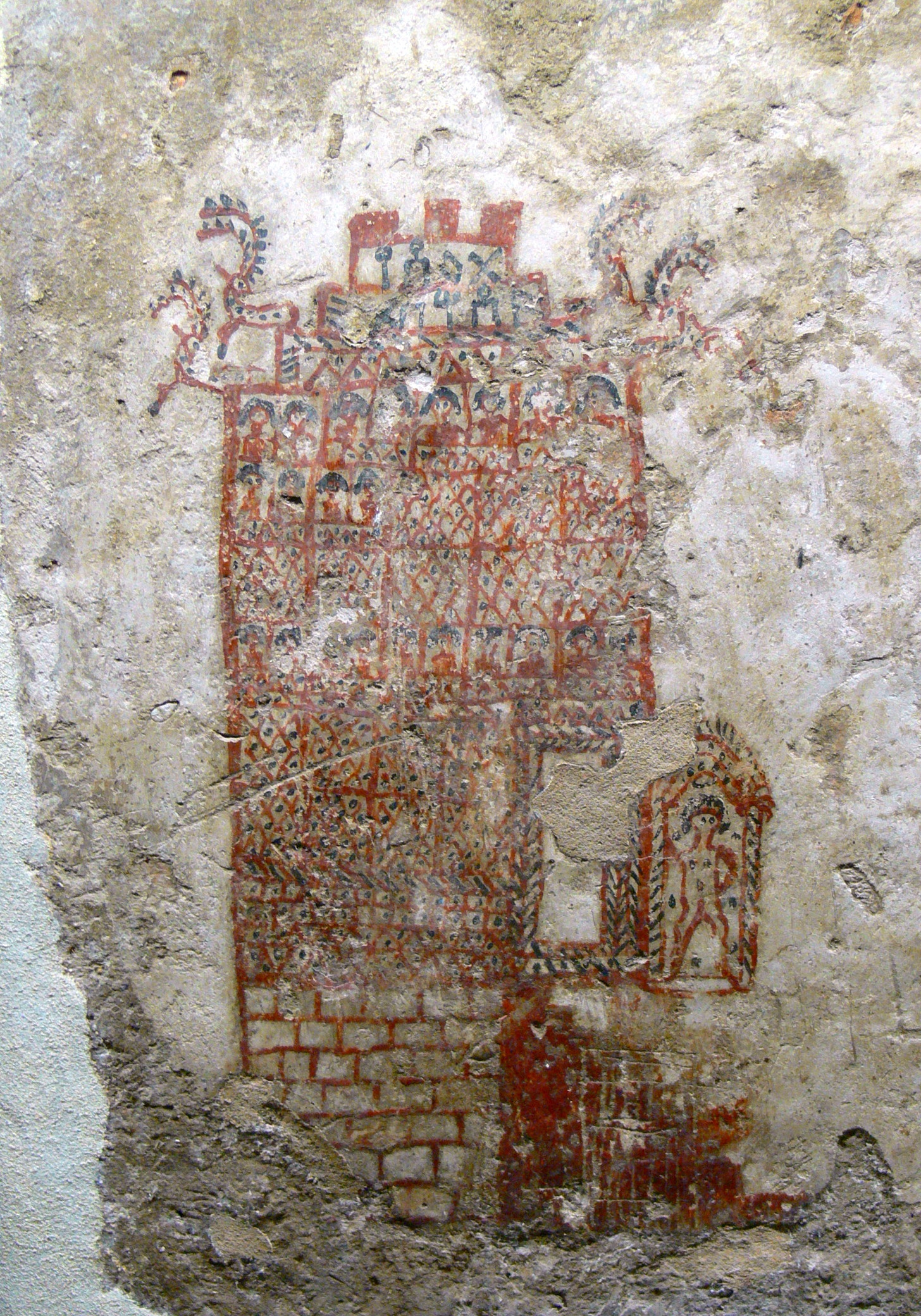
A 3rd-century BCE–3rd century CE wall painting depicting a tower house from Qaryat al-Faw, an ancient town settled by the Kinda during their rule over the Ma'add tribes

Himyarite influence over the Kinda likely contributed to their residence in settlements from which they ruled over the largely nomadic tribesmen of the Ma'add. The Arabic sources noted that the Kinda were associated with the Arabian sites of Ghamr Dhi Kinda, Batn Aqil in Najd, and Hajar in the Yamama.

Ghamr Dhi Kinda, was also known Qaryat Dhat Kahl, today known as Qaryat al-Faw. It was located two-days' distance northeast of Mecca, on a point in the trade route connecting South Arabia with eastern Arabia and Iraq. It was likely Royal Kinda's capital. It had been a settlement of the Minaeans, a South Arabian people whose recorded history spanned the 10th–2nd centuries BCE. Under both the Minaeans and the Kindites the town included a market, a palace, a temple, and several houses. The Kinda minted their own coins in the town inscribed with the name of their god, Kahl.

The Banu Akil al-Murar adopted Christianity. The most important Arabic Christian inscription of the pre-Islamic period commemorates the construction of a church in al-Hira by al-Harith ibn Amr's daughter Hind.

== Assessment ==
Kindite rule or influence over much of Arabia signaled the first attempt to unify the Arab tribes, according to Shahid, though their attempt was only done by forcing the tribes into submission and could not have been possible without Himyarite backing. The Kinda likely played a role in spreading Christian teachings in Najd and the Yamama. They also played a key role in spreading literacy among the tribes of Arabia, having learned the nascent Arabic language in al-Hira and thereafter disseminating it in their desert realms. One example of this cited in the Arabic sources is that of Bishr ibn Abd al-Malik of the Sakun, who moved to Mecca from al-Hira and taught Arabic there (late 6th–early 7th centuries). The Kindite poet-king Imru al-Qays became one of the most prominent poets of Arabic in history. According to Shahid, through the spread of his poetry among the Arabs and the Kinda's roughly century-long rule in Arabia,

Kinda accelerated the development of a common and standard Arabic language, transcending dialectical differences, a circumstance that attained its fullest significance with the rise of Islam.

== See also ==
- Kinaidokolpitai

== Bibliography ==
- Bamyeh, Mohammed A. (2006). "The Nomads of Pre-Islamic Arabia". In Chatty, Dawn (ed.). Nomadic Societies in the Middle East and North Africa: Entering the 21st Century. Leiden: Brill. pp. 33–48. ISBN 90-04-14792-6.
- Beeston, A. F. L. (1986). "Kinda — The relations of Kinda with Saba and Himyar". In Bosworth, C. E.; van Donzel, E.; Lewis, B. & Pellat, Ch. (eds.). The Encyclopaedia of Islam, Second Edition. Volume V: Khe–Mahi. Leiden: E. J. Brill. p. 120. ISBN 978-90-04-07819-2.
- Bosworth, C. E., ed. (1999). The History of al-Ṭabarī, Volume V: The Sāsānids, the Byzantines, the Lakhmids, and Yemen. SUNY Series in Near Eastern Studies. Albany, New York: State University of New York Press. ISBN 978-0-7914-4355-2.
- Caskel, Werner (1966). Ğamharat an-nasab: Das genealogische Werk des His̆ām ibn Muḥammad al-Kalbī, Volume II (in German). Leiden: Brill.
- Hoyland, Robert G. (2001). Arabia and the Arabs: From the Bronze Age to the coming of Islam. London and New York: Routledge. ISBN 0-415-19534-9.
- Lecker, Michael (November 1994). "Kinda on the Eve of Islam and during the "Ridda"". Journal of the Royal Asiatic Society. 4 (3): 333–356. doi:10.1017/S1356186300005964. JSTOR 25182938. S2CID 162695659.
- Montgomery, James E. (2006). "The Empty Ḥijāz". In Montgomery, James E. (ed.). Arabic Theology, Arabic Philosophy: From the Many to the One : Essays in Celebration of Richard M. Frank. Leuven: Peeters Publishers and Department of Oriental Studies. pp. 37–100. ISBN 90-429-1778-4.
- Olinder, Gunnar (1927). The Kings of Kinda of the Family of Ākil al-Murār. Lund: Hakan Ohlsson.
- Shahid, I. (1986). "Kinda". In Bosworth, C. E.; van Donzel, E.; Lewis, B. & Pellat, Ch. (eds.). The Encyclopaedia of Islam, Second Edition. Volume V: Khe–Mahi. Leiden: E. J. Brill. pp. 118–120. ISBN 978-90-04-07819-2.
- Shahid, Irfan (1995). Byzantium and the Arabs in the Sixth Century: Volume I, Part 1: Political and Military History. Washington, D.C.: Dumbarton Oaks Research Library and Collection. ISBN 0-88402-214-5.
- Shahid, Irfan (1989). Byzantium and the Arabs in the Fifth Century. Washington, D.C.: Dumbarton Oaks Research Library and Collection. ISBN 0-88402-152-1.
- Shahid, Irfan (1984). Byzantium and the Arabs in the Fourth Century. Washington, D.C.: Dumbarton Oaks Research Library and Collection. ISBN 0-88402-116-5.
