= Kinda (tribe) =

South Arabian tribe

- Kahlanite Arab tribe
- Nisba: Kindī
- Descended from: Thawr ibn Ufayr
- Branches: Mu'awiya; Al-Harith al-Asghar; Jabala; Akil al-Murar; Al-Jawn; Al-Wallada; Wali'a; Sakun; Qatira; Tujib; Sakasik
- Religion: Arabian polytheism (until 630s), Judaism (until 630s), Mazdakism (very limited in 520s), Christianity (early 6th century), Islam (630s and after)

The Kinda, or Kindah, (Arabic: كِنْدَة, Ancient South Arabian script: 𐩫𐩬𐩵𐩩) were an Arab tribe from South Arabia. Originating in the region to the west of Hadramawt, the Kinda tribe is known to have served the Sabaean Kingdom as Bedouin auxiliaries as early as the 3rd century, later allying themselves with the Himyarite Kingdom (early 4th century).

In the mid-5th century, the tribe established its own kingdom over the Arab tribal confederation of Ma'add in northern and central Arabia, known as the Kingdom of Kinda, which lasted until the mid-6th century. By this point its rulers had all been killed or prompted to flee for Hadramawt. There, the bulk of the tribe had continued to reside and dominate. While many of the tribesmen in Hadramawt likely embraced Judaism with the Himyarites, many of those in central and northern Arabia embraced Christianity.

After accepting Islam during the lifetime of the Islamic prophet Muhammad (died 632), their leading families revolted against the early Muslim state during the Ridda wars (632–633). The tribe was dealt a heavy blow, but surviving leaders, such as al-Ash'ath ibn Qays, repented and played important roles in the early Muslim conquests. Members of the Kinda continued to serve in prominent positions throughout the early centuries of the Caliphate.

== Genealogy and branches ==
The Kinda's genealogy, real or perceived, traced them back to the semi-legendary Kahlan, making them, and other South Arabian tribal groups such as the Azd, ethnically distinct from non-Arab South Arabians, such as the Himyar. The name 'Kinda' was a nickname for the tribe's progenitor, Thawr ibn Ufayr. His sons were the progenitors of the Kinda's principle branches, the Banu Mu'awiya, the Sakun and the Sakasik. The latter two are often grouped together in the literary sources as the Ashras group.

The Banu Mu'awiya was the leading branch of the tribe. From its Banu Amr sub-branch descended the royal households of Kinda, namely the Banu Akil al-Murar in Najd and the Yamama in central Arabia (see below) and the Banu Wali'a in the Hadhramawt in southern Arabia. After the advent of Islam, preeminent leadership of the tribe passed to another division of the Banu Mu'awiya, the Banu al-Harith al-Asghar.

== Pre-Islamic history ==
=== Relations with Saba and Himyar in South Arabia ===
Several Sabaean inscriptions mention the Kinda, pronounced "Kdt" in the South Arabian script. The chronology of the inscriptions in not clear, though it is possible the earliest dates to the 3rd century CE. That particular inscription mentions that a king of Kinda named Malik led a tribal confederation, one of whose members, Imru al-Qays ibn Awf, attacked Saba. As a result, Malik and the lesser-ranking chiefs of the confederation were compelled by Saba to surrender Imru al-Qays and provide compensation and hostages from the tribe. In other inscriptions from about the same time, the Kinda are mentioned together with other nomadic Arab groups, including the Madhhij, as being subordinated under a Sabaean officer called "kabir of the Arabs of the king of Saba, and Kinda and Madhhij". According to the historian A. F. L. Beeston, the Kinda and Madhhij were likely auxiliaries to the army of Saba.

The Kinda, as well as Arabs of the Madhhij and Murad confederations, continued their role as nomad auxiliaries under the Himyarite king Dhu Nuwas in the early 6th century CE. Dhu Nuwas placed them under a Sabaean commander from the aristocratic Yaz'an family during campaigns against nomadic tribes in central Arabia. The Kinda in Hadhramawt, likely due to their dependence on the Jewish Himyarites, at least partly adopted Judaism.

=== Kings of Ma'add in central Arabia ===
In the mid-5th century, part of the Kinda, with support from Himyar, migrated into central and northern Arabia and asserted dominance over the large Arab tribal confederation of Ma'add. The Kindites were led by Hujr, founder of the tribe's royal household, the Banu Akil al-Murar. The subordination of the nomadic tribes of Ma'add to the Banu Akil al-Murar was the initiative of the Ma'add, especially its Bakr division, to bring order to its constantly feuding constituent tribes. The Bakr sent envoys to the king of Himyar, inviting him to be their king. Instead, the king delegated the role to Hujr for unclear reasons.

After his death, Hujr was succeeded in the Najd (northern central Arabia) part of his domains by his eldest son, Amr al-Maqsur. His younger son, Mu'awiya al-Jawn, founder of the Banu al-Jawn house, ruled over the Ma'add in the Yamama (southern central Arabia).Although there are no particular achievements attributed to Hujr's sons, his grandson, al-Harith ibn Amr, became the best-known Kindite king, under whom the Kinda reached their zenith.

Kindite assaults on the Byzantine frontier in the Levant prompted the empire into an arrangement with the Kinda under al-Harith (who they called Arethas) to act as their federates, guarding the imperial border. Sometime during the reign of the Sasanian king Kavad I (r. 498–531), al-Harith captured the Lakhmid capital of al-Hira in Iraq. His rule there was short-lived, but during that time he adopted the Iranian religion of Mazdakism. After his brief rulership over al-Hira he returned to the Byzantines fold. He was granted a phylarchate in Palestine, but after a conflict with its governor he fled into the desert. There, in 528, he was slain by the Lakhmid king al-Mundhir III or the Banu Kalb tribe.

About two years after al-Harith's death the Byzantines, seeking to build an alliance against the Sasanians, dispatched envoys Julian and Nonossus to enlist Ethiopia, Himyar, and the Kinda. Through Byzantine diplomacy, the Kindite king in Najd, Qays, likely the son of Salama ibn al-Harith, agreed to enter Byzantine service and leave his territory under the rule of his brothers Yazid and Amr. Qays went to the Byzantine capital Constantinople and was thereafter given a command in Palestine. Al-Harith had split command of the Ma'add among four of his sons, Hujr, Ma'di-Karib, Shurahbil and Salama. Rivalries broke out among the brothers, leading to the deaths of Shurahbil and Hujr, before al-Harith's death. The Kindite monarchy was consequently left in a state of disorder.

By the late 6th century, Kindite power throughout central Arabia was fraying. The wars between al-Harith's sons had weakened them in Najd. In the neighboring Yamama, the al-Jawn became involved in a war between constituents of the Ma'add, leading to their defeat at the battle of Shi'b Jabala in Najd, dated variously by modern historians to circa 550, 570 or 580. Their loss there and in a subsequent battle contributed to the Kinda's abandonment of the Yamama and return to their Hadhramawt ancestral homeland. The Kindite migration back to Hadhramawt included some 30,000 members of the tribe departing their settlements of Ghamr Dhi Kinda in Najd and Hajar and al-Mushaqqar in the Yamama.

=== State of affairs in the late 6th–early 7th centuries ===
In Yemen and the Hadhramawt, Kindite territories were divided between different branches of the tribe. On the eve of Islam in the 620s–630s, the medieval Islamic sources mention that the fortress of al-Nujayr was controlled by the house of Ma'dikarib, a leading family of the Banu Harith al-Asghar, itself belonging to the Amr branch of the Banu Mu'awiya. Another fort, Tarim, was controlled by a descendant of the Banu Akil al-Murar, Abu al-Khayr Amr. While the leading Kindite families in the Hadhramawt may have been referred to as 'kings' in the literary sources, their domain was usually restricted to a particular wadi (seasonal stream or river valley).

The previous preeminent leadership of the Banu Akil al-Murar did not prevail over all the Kindites of the Hadhramawt, where the Banu al-Harith al-Wallada, in particular its Banu Wali'a house, vied for paramountcy. The Wali'a, which consisted of at least five brothers, Mikhwas, Mishrah, Jamd, Abdu'a, and Suraqah, and an influential sister, Ammarada, may have had the secret backing of the Sasanian rulers of Yemen at that time, as the Muslim sources claim that Abu al-Khayr, or alternatively Abu al-Jabr ibn Amr ibn Yazid ibn Shurahbil (great-great grandson of the king al-Harith ibn Amr), was poisoned by the Persians. Afterward, the Banu al-Harith al-Wallada achieved supremacy over the Kinda in Hadhramawt.

== Islamic history ==
=== Relations with Muhammad ===
The Wali'a and al-Ash'ath ibn Qays, a leader of the Banu Jabala clan of the Banu al-Harith al-Asghar, sent deputations to the Islamic prophet Muhammad (died 632) and accepted Islam. Reports in the early Muslim historical tradition note that Muhammad granted the Wali'a a designated portion of the tax revenue collected from the Hadhramawt and mandated that the people of that region deliver it to them annually. The Tujib clan of the Sakun also embraced Islam after meeting Muhammad, while a king of the Sakun in the north Arabian oasis town of Dumat al-Jandal, al-Ukaydir ibn Abd al-Malik, accepted the religion during Muhammad's lifetime.

=== Role in the Ridda wars ===
In 632, following the death of Muhammad, the Kinda rebelled against the nascent Muslim state in Medina when its governor of Hadhramawt, Ziyad ibn Labid al-Ansari, withheld the tribe's designated tax revenues. Ziyad and his army, which included the Banu Qatira clan of the Sakun, launched a surprise attack against the Banu Amr. The leaders of the Banu Wali'a were slain and the clan appointed al-Ash'ath, who did not belong to it, as their king, making him the most powerful Kindite chief.

A series of minor skirmishes followed throughout the Hadhramawt where various Kindite clans were defeated by Ziyad. Al-Ash'ath gathered tribesmen from his own clan, the Banu Jabala, and other clans of the Banu al-Harith al-Asghar, and bested Muslim forces near Tarim fort, before besieging the Muslim troops taking refuge in the fort. The arrival of Muslim reinforcements led by Muhajir ibn Abi Umayya compelled al-Ash'ath to lift the siege, but he resumed his assault with backup from other Kindite clans, including the Banu al-Arqam. These Kindite reinforcements abandoned the campaign after al-Ash'ath praised the killing of Ziyad's messenger by one of his men. Nonetheless, al-Ash'ath defeated the larger Muslim force, including the Sakun, at a major battle in the valley of Zurqan. Another Muslim force led by Ikrima ibn Abi Jahl arrived to support Ziyad and Muhajir, prompting al-Ash'ath to barricade himself and his side's women and children in the fortress of Nujayr. There, they were besieged and defeated by the Muslims, though al-Ash'ath was pardoned.

=== Post-Ridda ===
While the pre-Islamic Kindite nobility played an insignificant role under the Caliphate, several of the Banu al-Harith al-Asghar's members held prominence. Al-Ash'ath played a command role in the conquest of Iraq in the 630s. He bested his rival kinsman from the Banu Jabala, Shurahbil ibn Simt, over leadership of the Kindites who settled in the Arab garrison center of Kufa. Shurahbil joined his father, al-Simt, who led the Kindites of Hims in Syria, whose conquest al-Simt had helped lead. During the First Muslim Civil War, al-Ash'ath sided with Caliph Ali (r. 656–661) and Shurahbil with the governor of Syria, Mu'awiya ibn Abi Sufyan (r. 639–661). Shurahbil later became governor of Hims under Mu'awiya. Al-Ash'ath had served as governor of Adharbayjan under Caliph Uthman (r. 644–656), Hujr ibn Yazid governed Arminiya under Mu'awiya (as caliph, r. 661–680), and Adi ibn Adi governed the Jazira, Arminiya, and Adharbayjan under caliphs Sulayman (r. 715–717) and Umar II (r. 717–720).

== Bibliography ==
- Bamyeh, Mohammed A. (2006). "The Nomads of Pre-Islamic Arabia". In Chatty, Dawn (ed.). Nomadic Societies in the Middle East and North Africa: Entering the 21st Century. Leiden: Brill. pp. 33–48. ISBN 90-04-14792-6.
- Beeston, A. F. L. (1986). "Kinda — The relations of Kinda with Saba and Himyar". In Bosworth, C. E.; van Donzel, E.; Lewis, B. & Pellat, Ch. (eds.). The Encyclopaedia of Islam, Second Edition. Volume V: Khe–Mahi. Leiden: E. J. Brill. p. 120. ISBN 978-90-04-07819-2.
- Bosworth, C. E., ed. (1999). The History of al-Ṭabarī, Volume V: The Sāsānids, the Byzantines, the Lakhmids, and Yemen. SUNY Series in Near Eastern Studies. Albany, New York: State University of New York Press. ISBN 978-0-7914-4355-2.
- Caskel, Werner (1966). Ğamharat an-nasab: Das genealogische Werk des His̆ām ibn Muḥammad al-Kalbī, Volume II (in German). Leiden: Brill.
- Lecker, Michael (November 1994). "Kinda on the Eve of Islam and during the "Ridda"". Journal of the Royal Asiatic Society. 4 (3): 333–356. doi:10.1017/S1356186300005964. JSTOR 25182938.
- Lecker, Michael (October–December 1995). "Judaism among Kinda and the Ridda of Kinda". Journal of the American Oriental Society. 115 (4): 635–650. doi:10.2307/604732. JSTOR 604732.
- Olinder, Gunnar (1927). The Kings of Kinda of the Family of Ākil al-Murār. Lund: Hakan Ohlsson.
- Shahid, I. (1986). "Kinda". In Bosworth, C. E.; van Donzel, E.; Lewis, B. & Pellat, Ch. (eds.). The Encyclopaedia of Islam, Second Edition. Volume V: Khe–Mahi. Leiden: E. J. Brill. pp. 118–120. ISBN 978-90-04-07819-2.
- Shahid, Irfan (1995). Byzantium and the Arabs in the Sixth Century: Volume I, Part 1: Political and Military History. Washington, D.C.: Dumbarton Oaks Research Library and Collection. ISBN 0-88402-214-5.
- Shahid, Irfan (1989). Byzantium and the Arabs in the Fifth Century. Washington, D.C.: Dumbarton Oaks Research Library and Collection. ISBN 0-88402-152-1.
- Shahid, Irfan (1984). Byzantium and the Arabs in the Fourth Century. Washington, D.C.: Dumbarton Oaks Research Library and Collection. ISBN 0-88402-116-5.
