= Alfred Felix Landon Beeston =

Alfred Felix Landon Beeston, FBA (23 February 1911 – 29 September 1995) was an English Orientalist best known for his studies of Arabic language and literature, and of ancient Yemeni inscriptions, as well as the history of pre-Islamic Arabia. His works were generally published under the name A. F. L. Beeston.

Beeston was born at Barnes in southwest London, and educated at Westminster School where he was a King's Scholar. At age 14 he grew fascinated with South Arabian inscriptions at the British Museum, which he attempted to decipher by means of an appendix in James Theodore Bent's Sacred City of the Ethiopians, asking for a Koran and Arabic dictionary as school prizes. In 1929 he entered Christ Church, Oxford, already determined to become a librarian in oriental studies; in 1933 he got a first in Arabic and Persian. In 1935, during the course of his D.Phil. under D. S. Margoliouth, on the subject of several Sabaic inscriptions, he accepted a post at the Bodleian Library. He completed the thesis in 1937.

He served in the Intelligence Corps between November 1940 and April 1946, stationed in Palestine. After his return to the Bodleian, he became Sub-Librarian and Keeper of Oriental Books and Manuscripts. In 1957 he was elected Laudian Professor of Arabic at Oxford, which chair he held until retirement in 1979.

Beeston achieved renown as a Semitic philologist for his South Arabian studies, particularly A Descriptive Grammar of Epigraphic South Arabian (1962) and A Sabaic Grammar (1980). He has also made important contributions to the study of the Ancient South Arabian history. Other major works include his contribution to the catalogue of the Persian, Turkish, Hindustani and Pushtu manuscripts in the Bodleian, his studies of the Arabic language, namely The Arabic Language Today (1970) and Written Arabic: An Approach to Basic Structures (1968), and editions and translations of classical texts including al-Baidawi's Commentary on Sura 12 of the Qur'an (1963) and The Singing Girls of al-Jahiz (1980). Despite this primary focus, however, his knowledge of languages ranged from Welsh and Hungarian to Chinese.

In 1965 he was elected a fellow of the British Academy.

== Selected works ==
In addition to scores of scholarly articles, Dr. Beeston produced the following major works.

- Sabaean Inscriptions, Oxford, VIII+152 pp. 1937.
- Catalogue of the Persian, Turkish, Hindustani and Pushtu Manuscripts in the Bodleian Library. Part III. Additional Persian Manuscripts, Oxford University Press, 1955.
- A Descriptive Grammar of Epigraphic South Arabian, London : Luzac, VII+80 pp. 1962.
- Baiḍawiʼs Commentary on Surah 12 of the Qurʾan: Text, Accompanied by an Interpretative Rendering and Notes, Oxford: Oxford University Press, 1963.
- Written Arabic, an Approach to the Basic Structures, Cambridge University Press, 1968.
- The Arabic Language Today, Coll. Modern Languages, London : Hutchinson, 1970.
- The Epistle on Singing-Girls of Jahiż, Warminster : Aris and Phillips, 1980.
- Sabaic Dictionary (English-French-Arabic) /Dictionnaire sabéen (anglais-français-arabe) /al-Mu'gam as-saba'i (bi-al-ingliziyya wa-al-firansiyya wa al-'arabiyya), Publication of the University of Sanaa, YAR, Louvain-la-Neuve (Editions Peeters) et Beyrouth (Librairie du Liban), XLI+173+IVpp., in collaboration with M.A. Ghul, W.W. Müller et J. Ryckmans. 1982.
- Mukhtarat min al-nuqush al-yamaniyyah al-qadimah, Tunis (al-Munazzamah al-'arabiyyah li-l-Tarbiya wa-l-thaqafa wa-al-'Ulum), 478 pp. and two maps, in collaboration with Muhammad Bafaqih, Christian Robin, and Mahmud al-Ghul. 1985 (in Arabic).
