= Sasanian architecture =

Architecture of the Sasanian Empire

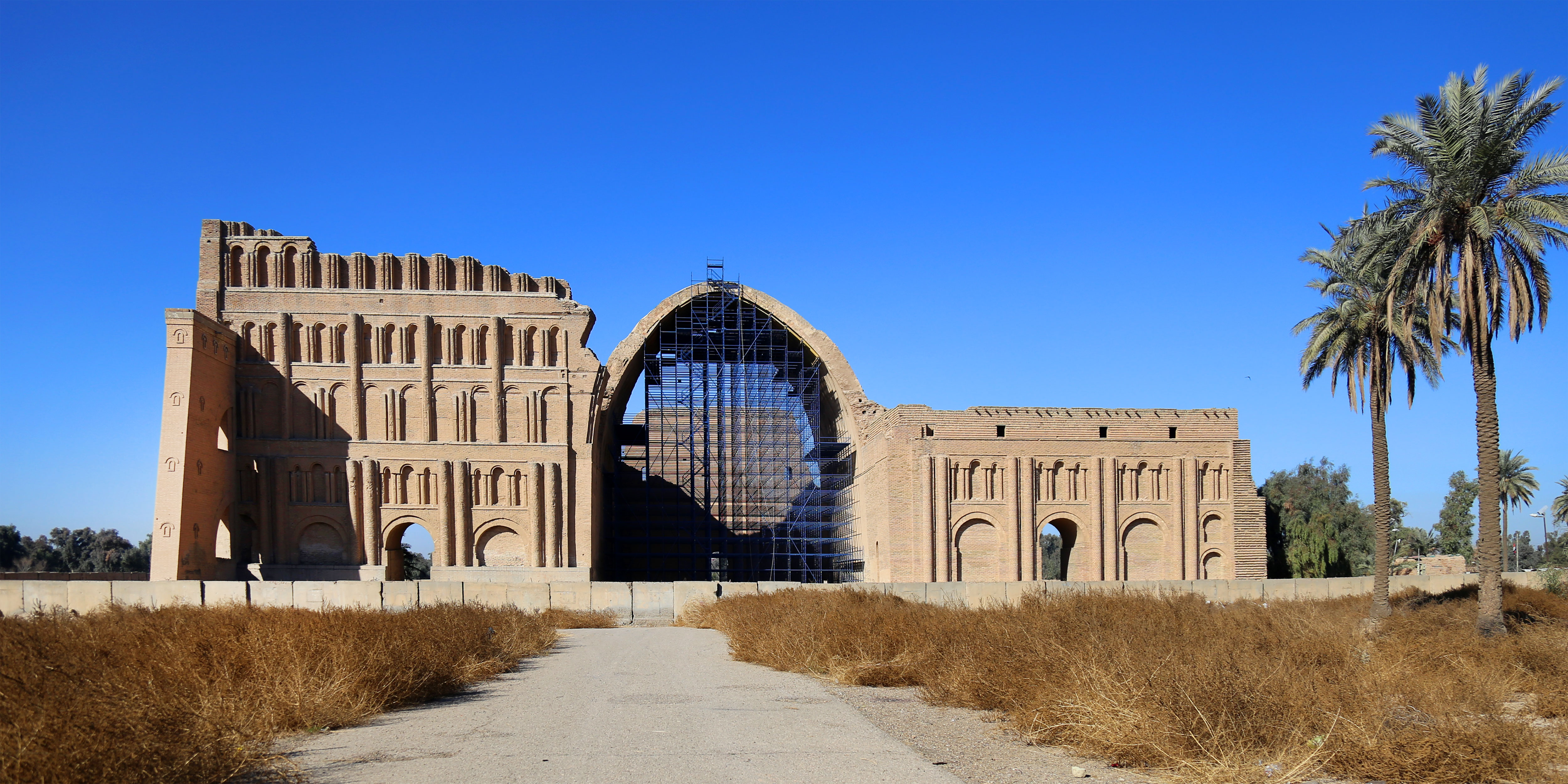
Taq Kasra, a remnant of the former Sasanian palace in Ctesiphon

Sasanian architecture refers to the Persian architectural style that reached a peak in its development during the Sasanian era (224–651 CE). In many ways, the Sasanian era witnessed the highest achievement of Iranian civilization, and constituted the last great pre-Islamic Persian Empire before the Muslim conquest. Much of Sasanian architecture was adopted by Muslims and became part of Islamic architecture.

The Sasanian dynasty, like the Achaemenid dynasty, originated in the province of Persis (Fars). They saw themselves as successors to the Achaemenids, after the Seleucid and Parthian interlude, and perceived it as their role to restore the greatness of Persia.

== Origins ==
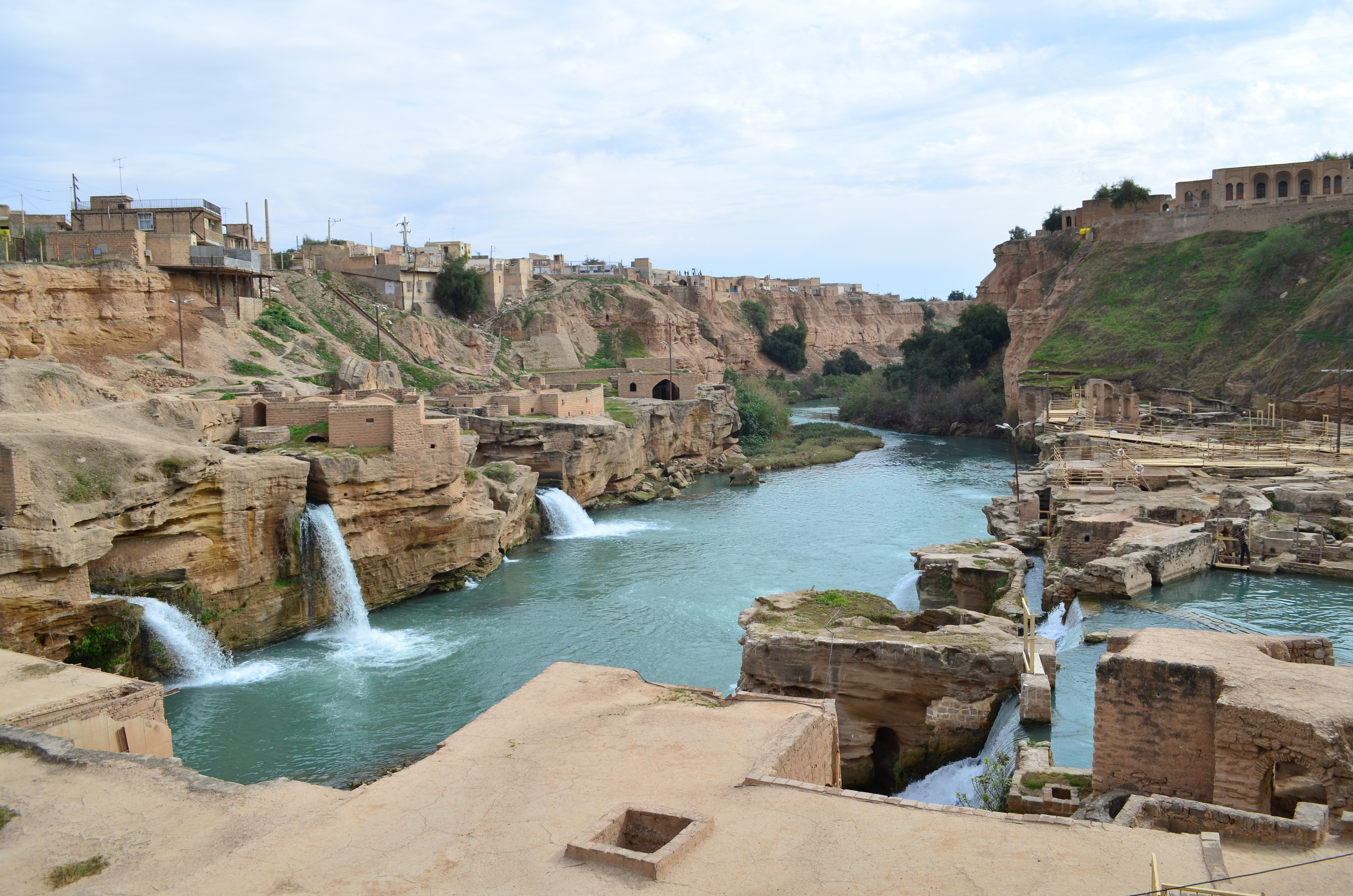
The Shushtar Historical Hydraulic System partly dates back to the Achaemenid era.

In reviving the glories of the Achaemenid past, the Sasanians were no mere imitators. The art of this period reveals an astonishing virility. In certain respects, it anticipates features later developed during the Islamic period. The conquest of Persia by Alexander the Great had inaugurated the spread of Hellenistic art into Western Asia. Still, if the East accepted the outward form of this art, it never really assimilated its spirit. Already in the Parthian era, Hellenistic art was being interpreted freely by the peoples of the Near East, and throughout the Sasanian era, there was a continuing process of reaction against it. Sasanian art revived forms and traditions native to Persia, and in the Islamic period, these reached the shores of the Mediterranean.

== Palaces ==
The splendour in which the Sasanian monarchs lived is well illustrated by their surviving palaces, such as those at Firouzabad and Bishapur in Fars, and the capital city of Ctesiphon in modern Iraq. In addition to local traditions, Parthian dynastic architecture must have been responsible for a great many of the Sasanian architectural characteristics. All are characterised by the barrel-vaulted iwans introduced in the Parthian era, but now they reached massive proportions, particularly at Ctesiphon. The arch of the great vaulted hall at Ctesiphon, attributed to the reign of Shapur I (r. 240–270) has a span of more than 80 ft, and reaches a height of 118 ft. from the ground. This magnificent structure fascinated architects in the centuries that followed and has always been considered one of the most important pieces of Persian architecture.

Many of the palaces contain an inner audience hall which consists, as at Firuzabad, of a chamber surmounted by a dome. The Persians solved the problem of constructing a circular dome on a square building with the squinch. This is an arch built across each corner of the square, thereby converting it into an octagon on which it is simple to place the dome. The dome chamber in the palace of Firouzabad is the earliest surviving example of the use of the squinch, and so there is good reason for regarding Persia as its place of invention.

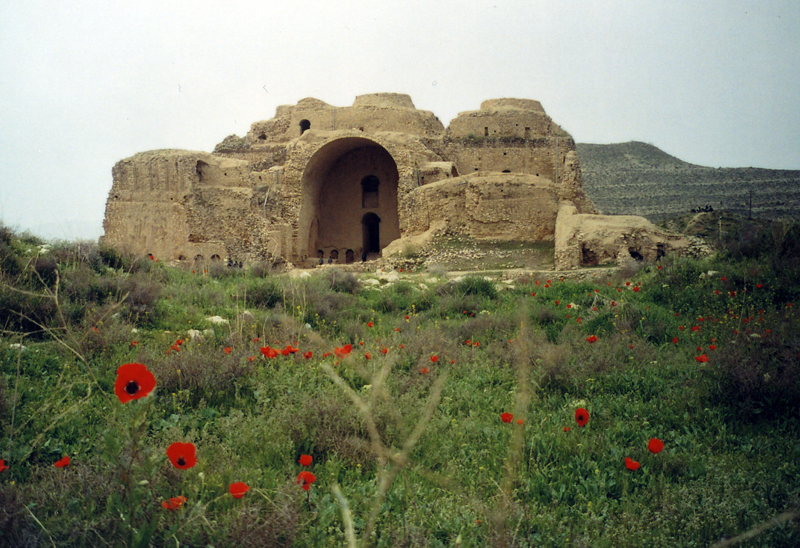
The Palace of Ardashir, constructed in AD 224 during the Sasanian era. The building has three large domes, among the oldest examples of such large-scale domes in the world.

The early palaces of the Sasanians have ceased to exist. Ardashir I and Shapur I, and their immediate successors, undoubtedly erected residences for themselves exceeding in size and richness the buildings which had contented the Parthians, as well as those in which their ancestors, the tributary kings of Persia under Parthia, had passed their lives. But these residences have almost wholly disappeared.

== Descriptions ==
The most ancient of the Sasanian buildings that have been measured and described are assigned to the century between 350 and 450 CE; and we are unable to trace the exact steps by which the Sasanian style was gradually elaborated. We come upon it when it is beyond the stage of infancy, when it has acquired a marked and decided character, when it no longer hesitates or falters, but knows what it wants, and goes straight to its ends. Its main features are simple and uniform, the latter buildings being merely enlargements of the earlier, by an addition to the number or size of the apartments. The principal characteristics of the style are, first, that the plan of the entire building is a parallelogram, without adjuncts or projections; secondly, that the main entrance is into a lofty vaulted porch or hall by an archway of the entire width of the apartment; thirdly, that beside these oblong halls, the building contains square apartments, vaulted with domes, which are circular at their base, and elliptical in their section, and which rest on pendentives; fourthly, that the apartments are numerous and en suite, opening one into another, without the intervention of passages; and fifthly, that the palace consists of a court, placed towards the rear of the building, with apartments opening into it.

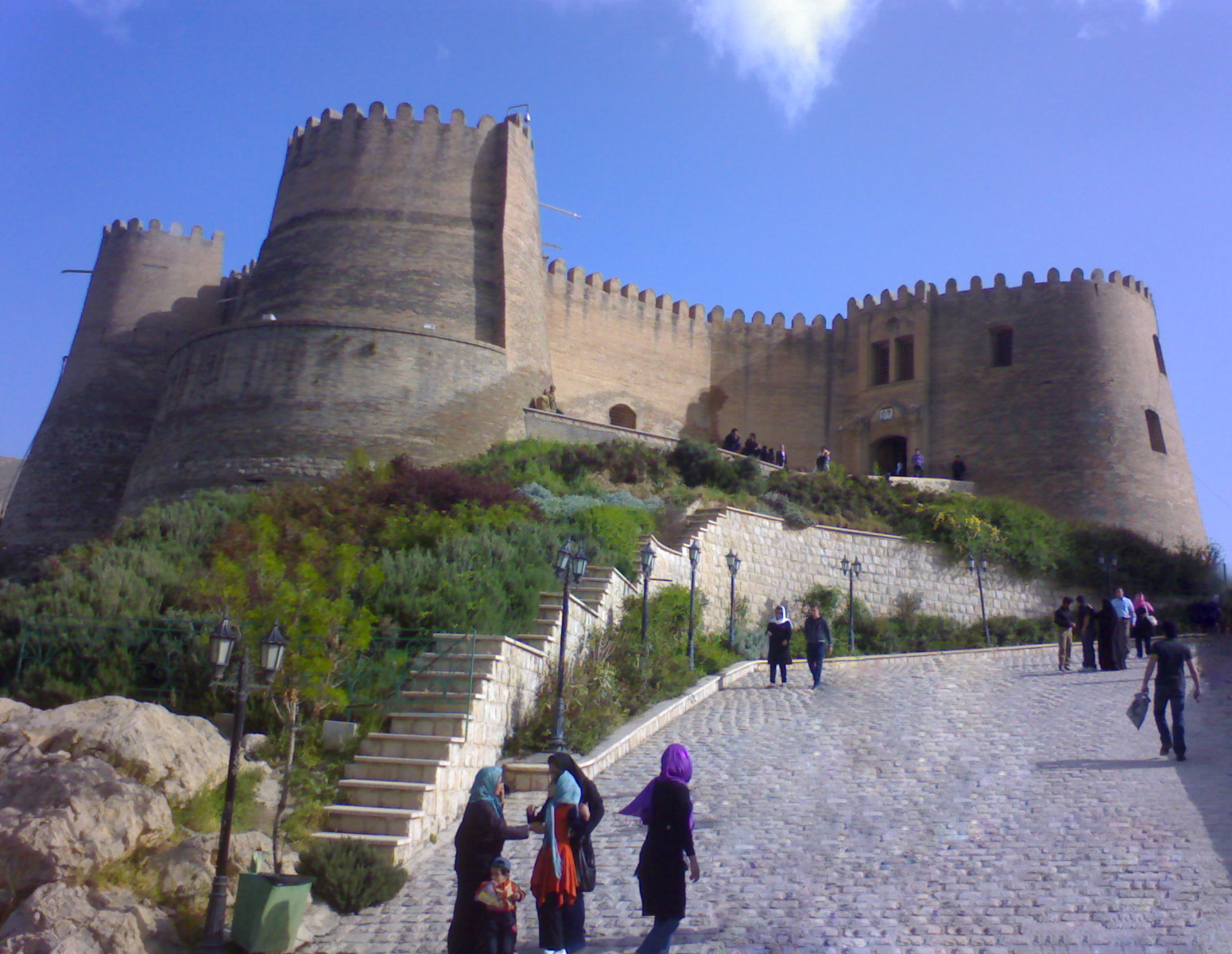
Falak-ol-Aflak in Khorramabad

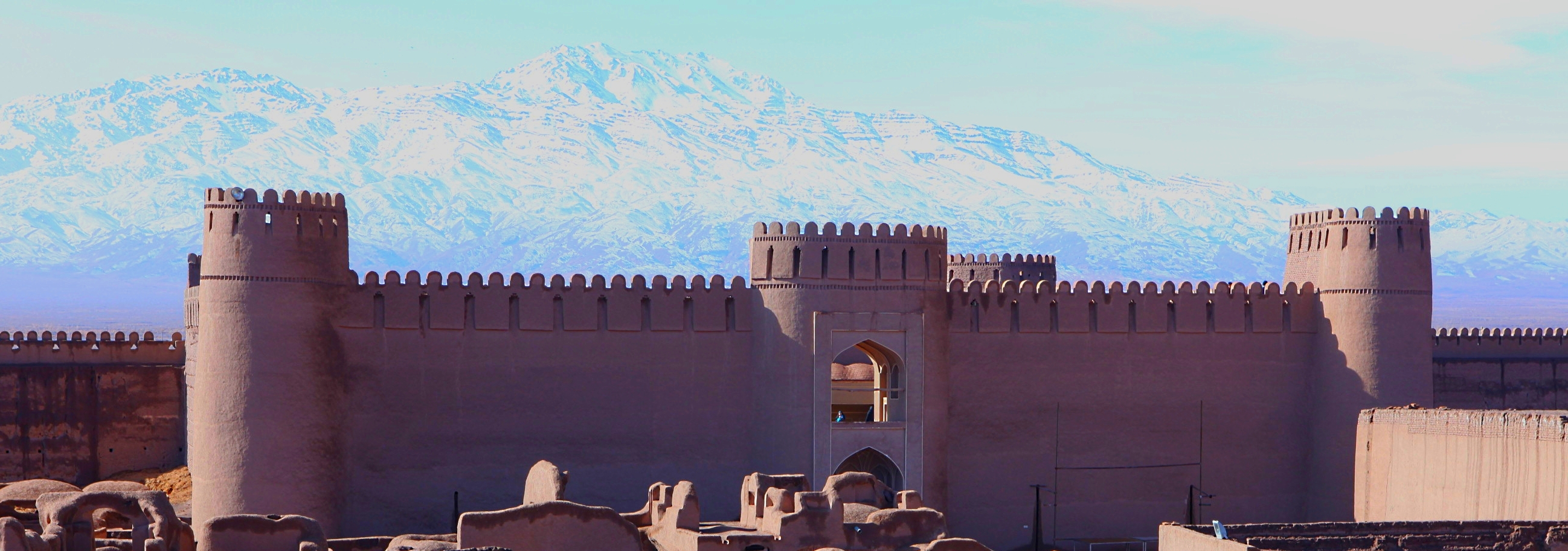
Rayen Castle

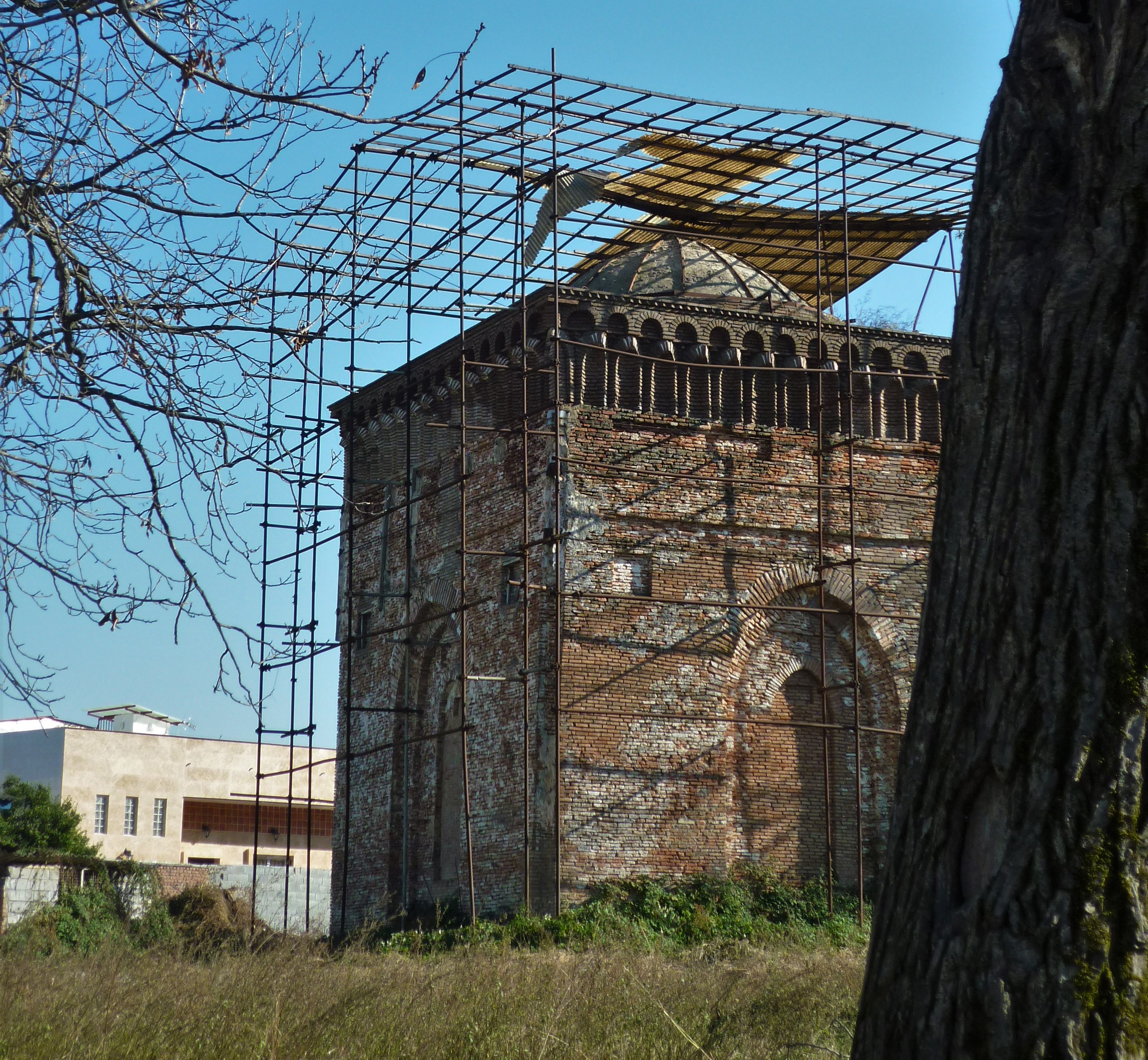
Fire Temple of Amol

The parallelogram is variously proportioned. The depth may be a little more than the breadth, or it may be nearly twice as much. In either case, the front occupies one of the shorter sides or ends of the edifice. The outer wall is sometimes pierced by one entrance only, but more commonly, entrances are multiplied beyond the limit commonly observed in modern buildings. The great entrance is in the exact center of the front. This entrance is commonly by a lofty arch which (if we set aside the domes) is of almost the full height of the building, and constitutes one of its most striking features. From the outer air, we look straight into the heart of the edifice, in one instance to the depth of 115 feet, a distance equal to the length of Henry VII's Chapel at Westminster. Similar entrances are common in the mosques of Armenia and Persia, and in the palaces of the latter country. In the mosques "lofty and deeply−recessed portals," "unrivalled for grandeur and appropriateness," are rather the rule than the exception; and, in the palaces, "Throne−rooms" are commonly mere deep recesses of this character, vaulted or supported by pillars, and open at one end to the full width and height of the apartment.

=== Arches ===
The height of the arch varies in Sasanian buildings from about fifty to eighty−five feet; it is generally without ornament, but in one case, we meet with a foiling of small arches round the great one. The domed apartments are squares of from 25 to a little more than 40 feet. The domes are circular at their base, but a section of them would exhibit a half ellipse, with its longest and shortest diameters proportioned as three to two. The height to which they rise from the ground is not much above 70 feet. A single building will have two or three domes, either of the same size or occasionally of different dimensions. It is a peculiarity of their construction that they rest not on drums, but on pendentives.

A series of semi−circular arches is thrown across the angles of the apartment, each projecting further into it than the preceding, and in this way, the corners of the square are rounded off into a circle. A cornice ran round the apartment, above or below the pendentives, or sometimes both above and below. The domes had several small holes, which admitted some light, and the upper part of the walls between the pendentives was also pierced by windows.

There are no passages or corridors in Sasanian palaces. The rooms, for the most part, open one into the other. Where this is not the case, they give up a common meeting−ground, which is either an open court or a large vaulted apartment. The openings are in general doorways of moderate size, but sometimes they are arches of the full width of the subordinate room or apartment. As many as seventeen or eighteen rooms have been found in a palace.

=== Ornamentation ===
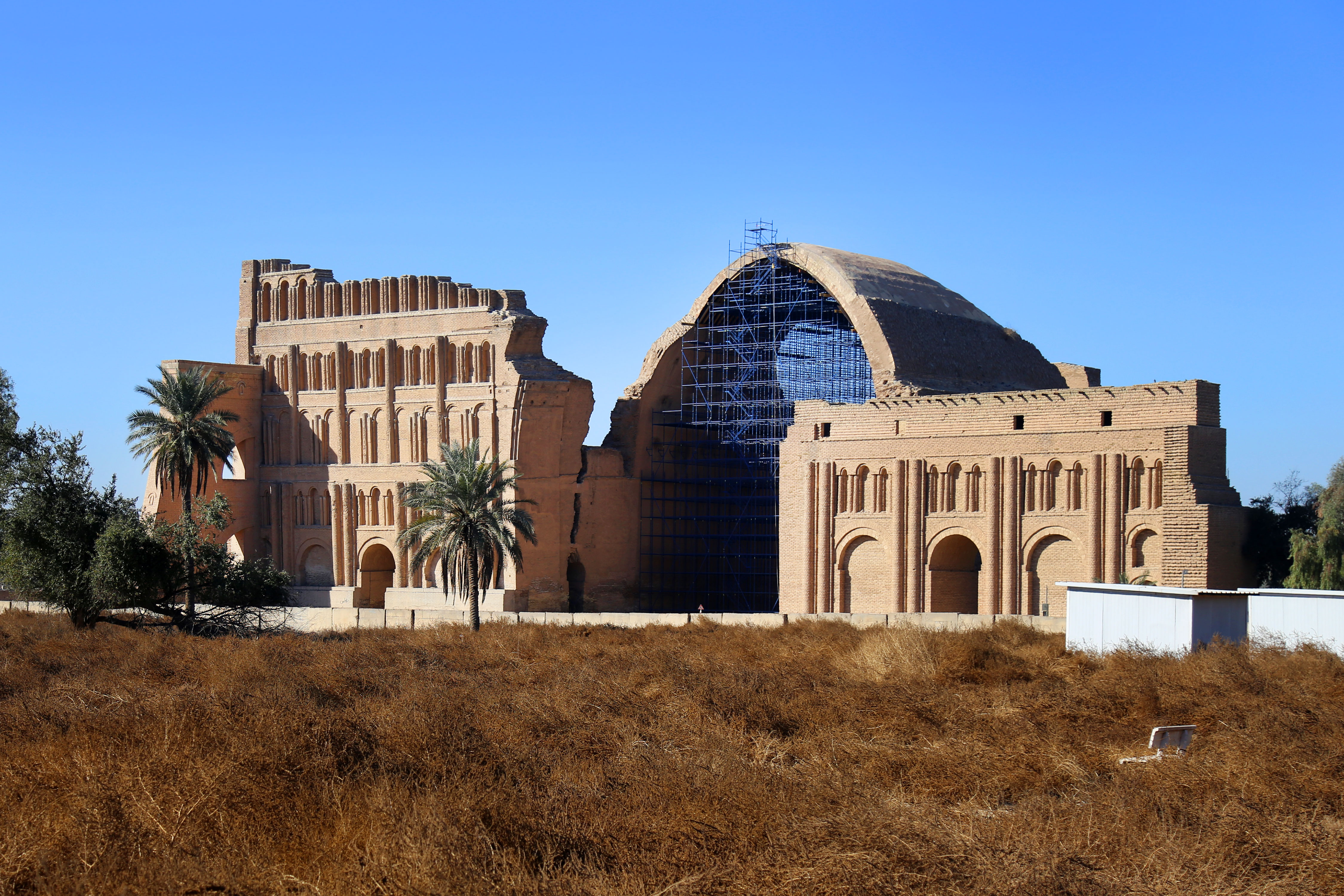
The Arch of Ctesiphon, is the only visible remaining structure of the Sasanian royal capital city of Ctesiphon.

The exterior ornamentation of the Sassanid from the ground to the cornice, while between them is a series of tall narrow, doubly recessed arches. Far less satisfactory is the much more elaborate design adopted at Ctesiphon, where six series of blind arches of different kinds are superimposed the one on the other, with string−courses between them, and with pilasters, placed singly or in pairs, separating the arches into groups, and not regularly superimposed, as pillars, whether real or seeming, ought to be. The interior ornamentation was probably, in a great measure, by stucco, painting, and perhaps gilding. All this, however, if it existed, has disappeared; and the interiors now present a bare and naked appearance, which is only slightly relieved by the occasional occurrence of windows, of ornamental doorways, and of niches, which recall well−known features at Persepolis. In some instances, the arrangement of the larger rooms was improved by utilizing short pillars, placed at some distance from the walls, and supporting a sort of transverse rib, which broke the uniformity of the roof. The pillars were connected with the side walls by low arches.

Such are the main distinctions of Sasanian palace architecture. The general effect of the great halls is grand, though scarcely beautiful and, in the best specimens, the entire palace has an air of simple severity which is striking and dignified. The edifices are regarded as "indicating considerable originality and power," though they "point to a state of society when attention to security hardly allowed the architect the free exercise of the more delicate ornaments of his art".

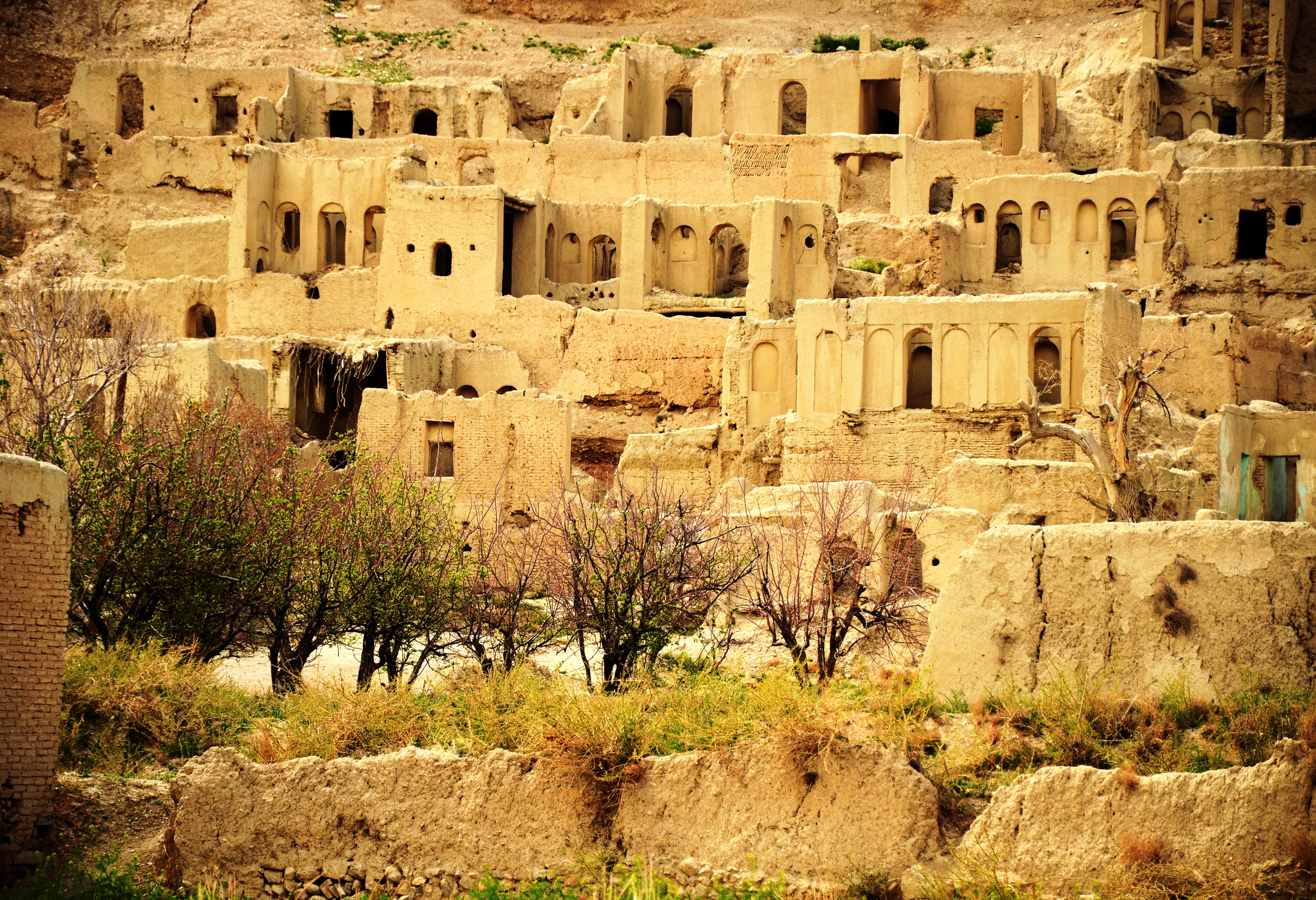
Houses in Izadkhast

=== Uniqueness ===
The unique characteristic of Sasanian architecture was its distinctive use of space. The Sasanian architect conceived his building in terms of masses and surfaces; hence, the use of massive walls of brick decorated with molded or carved stucco. Stucco wall decorations appear at Bishapur, but better examples are preserved from Chal Tarkhan near Ray (late Sasanian or early Islamic in date), and from Ctesiphon and Kish in Mesopotamia. The panels show animal figures set in roundels, human busts, and geometric and floral motifs.

== Sasanian influence ==
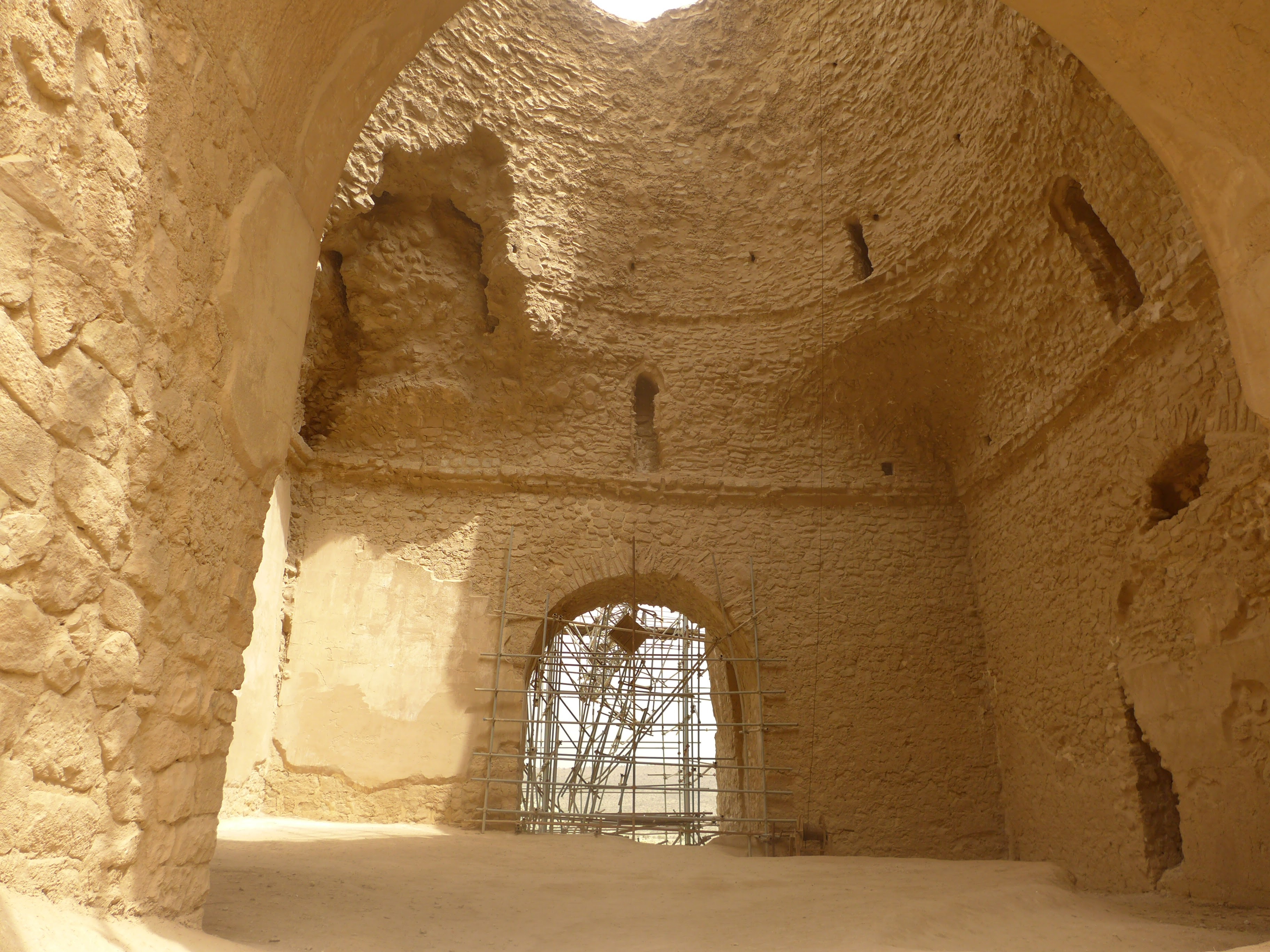
Interior of the Qal'eh Dokhtar. The use of squinches to position the dome on top of a square structure is considered the most significant Sasanian contribution to the Islamic architecture.

Sasanian art revived forms and traditions native to Persia, and in the Islamic period, these reached the shores of the Mediterranean. The influence of Sasanian architecture reached far beyond their borders; it had a distinctive influence on Byzantine architecture and Islamic architecture. Islamic architecture borrowed heavily from Persian architecture.

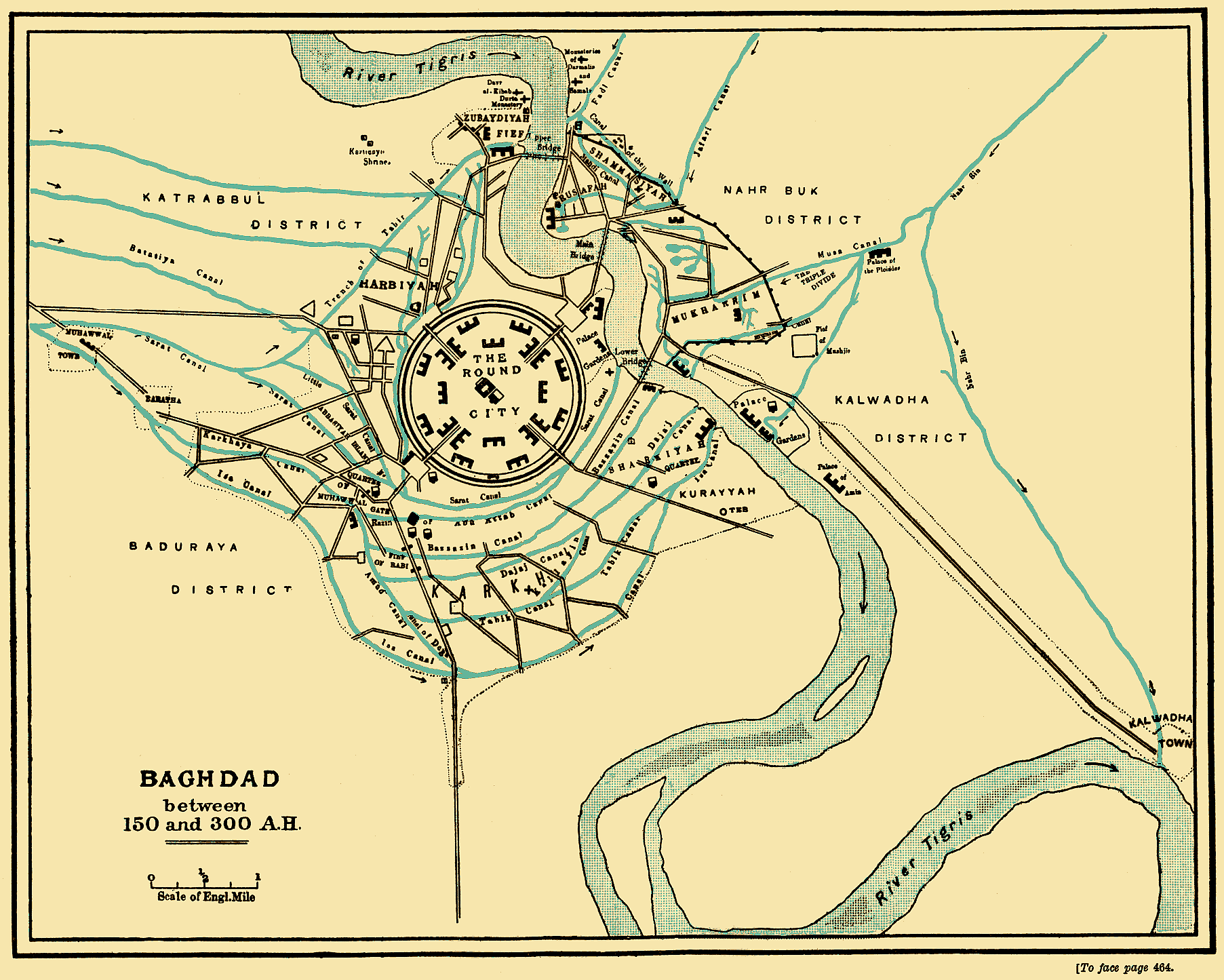
The Round City of Baghdad built in the Abbasid period was based on Partho-Sasanian circular city design.

Baghdad, for example, was based on Persian precedents such as Firouzabad in Persia. It is now known that the two designers who were hired by al-Mansur to plan the city's design were Naubakht, a former Persian Zoroastrian, and Mashallah, a former Jew from Khorasan, Iran.

The Great Mosque of Samarra is another example, where the spiral edifice was based on Persian architecture, such as the spiral tower in the middle of Firouzabad, a former Sasanian capital.

In Afghanistan at Bamian are ruins that show the great impact of Iranian art and architecture (especially from the Sassanid era) from the 4th to the 8th century. Frescoes and colossal Buddhas adorn Bamian's monasteries, revealing a fusion of Sasanian-Iranian and Greco-Buddhist elements.

=== Foreign influences ===
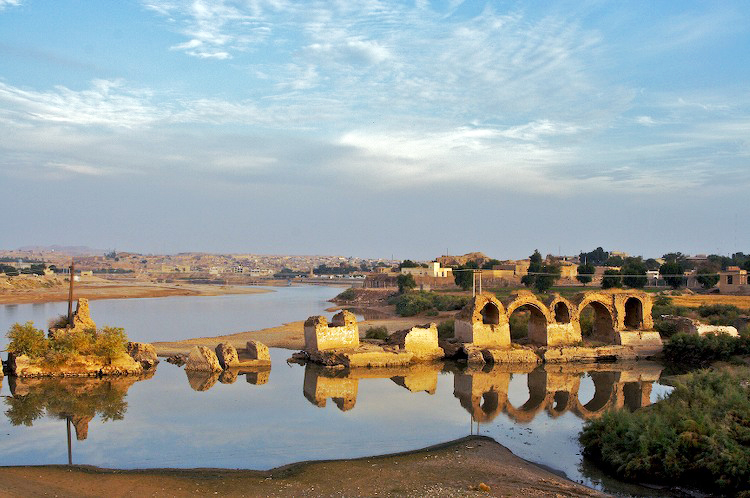
Band-e Kaisar

Byzantine architecture influenced some Sassanid architecture. One of the good examples is at Bishapur, some of the floors were decorated with mosaics showing scenes of merrymaking as at a banquet; the Roman influence here is clear, and the mosaics may have been laid by Roman prisoners. Buildings were also decorated with wall paintings; particularly fine examples have been found on Mount Khajeh in Sistan.

== Gallery ==
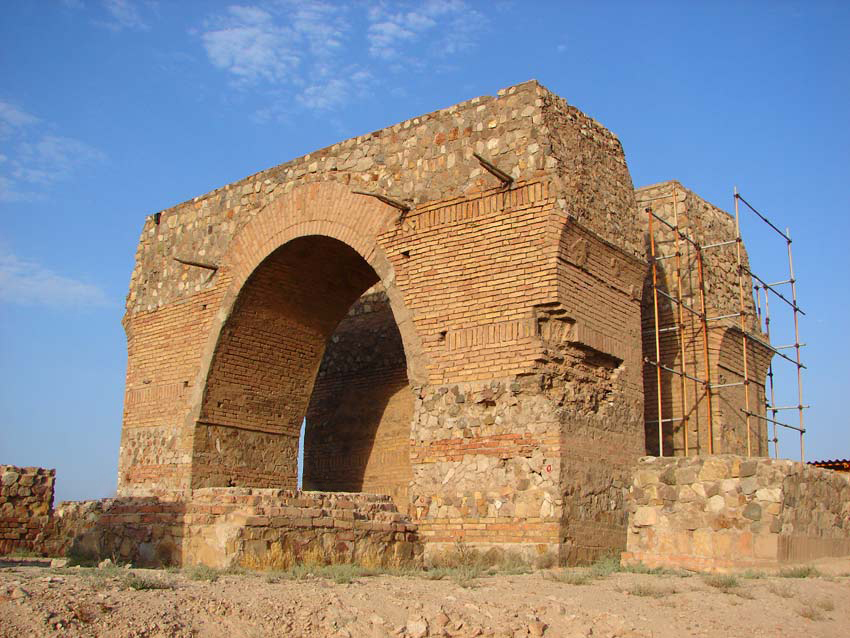
Bahram Fire Temple

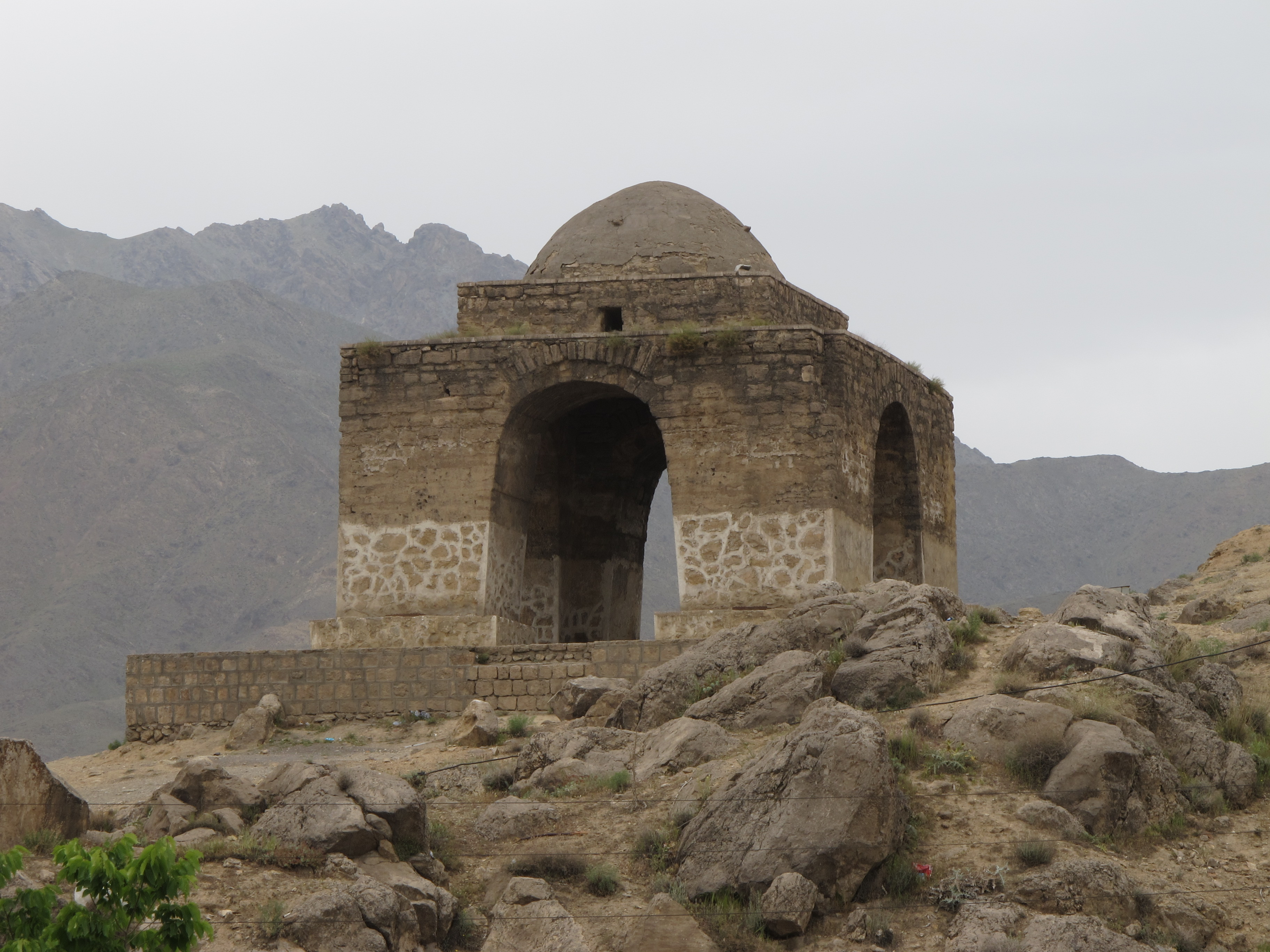
Niasar Fire Temple

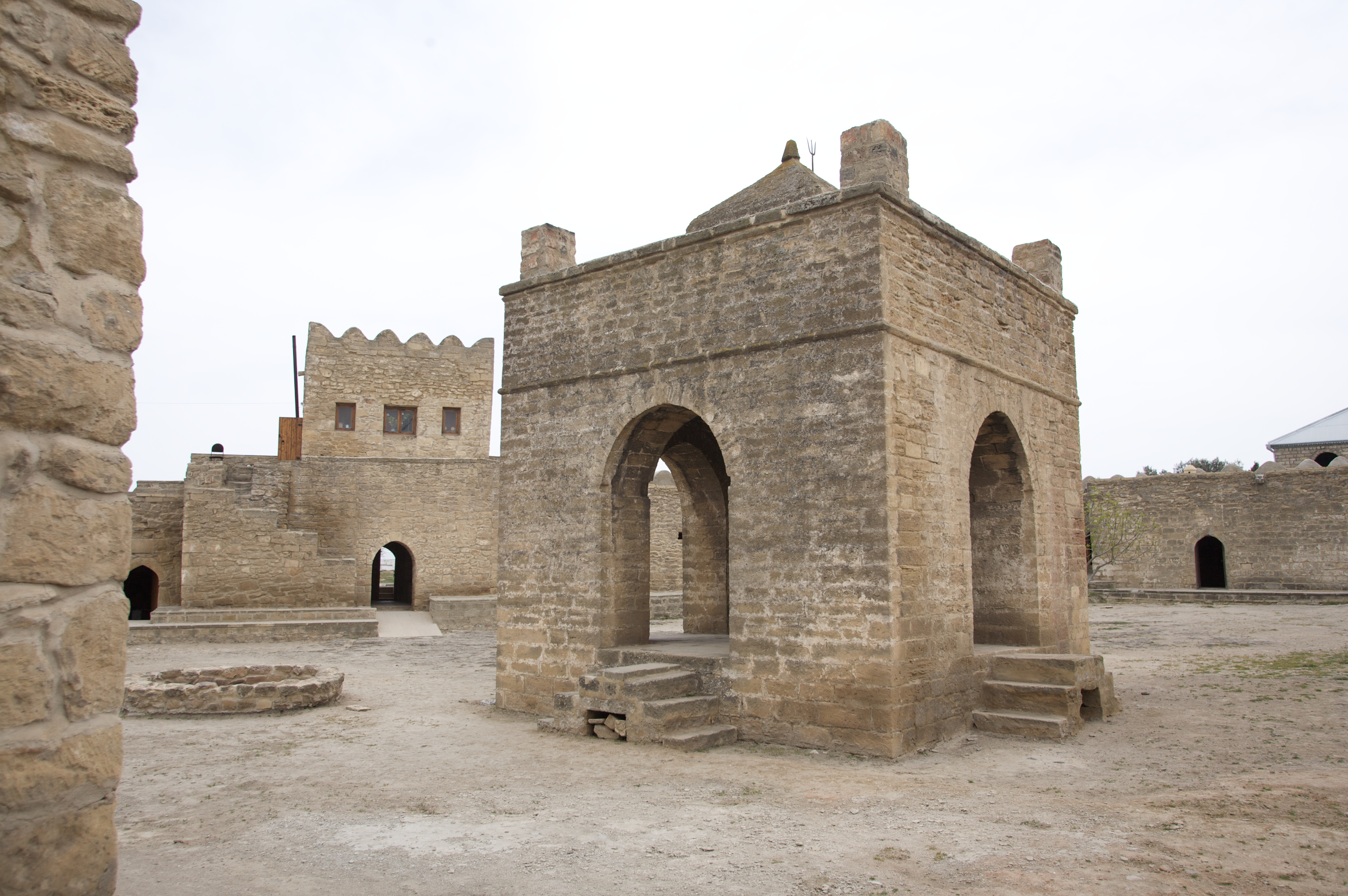
Ateshgah of Baku in Republic of Azerbaijan

Tashveer Fire temple

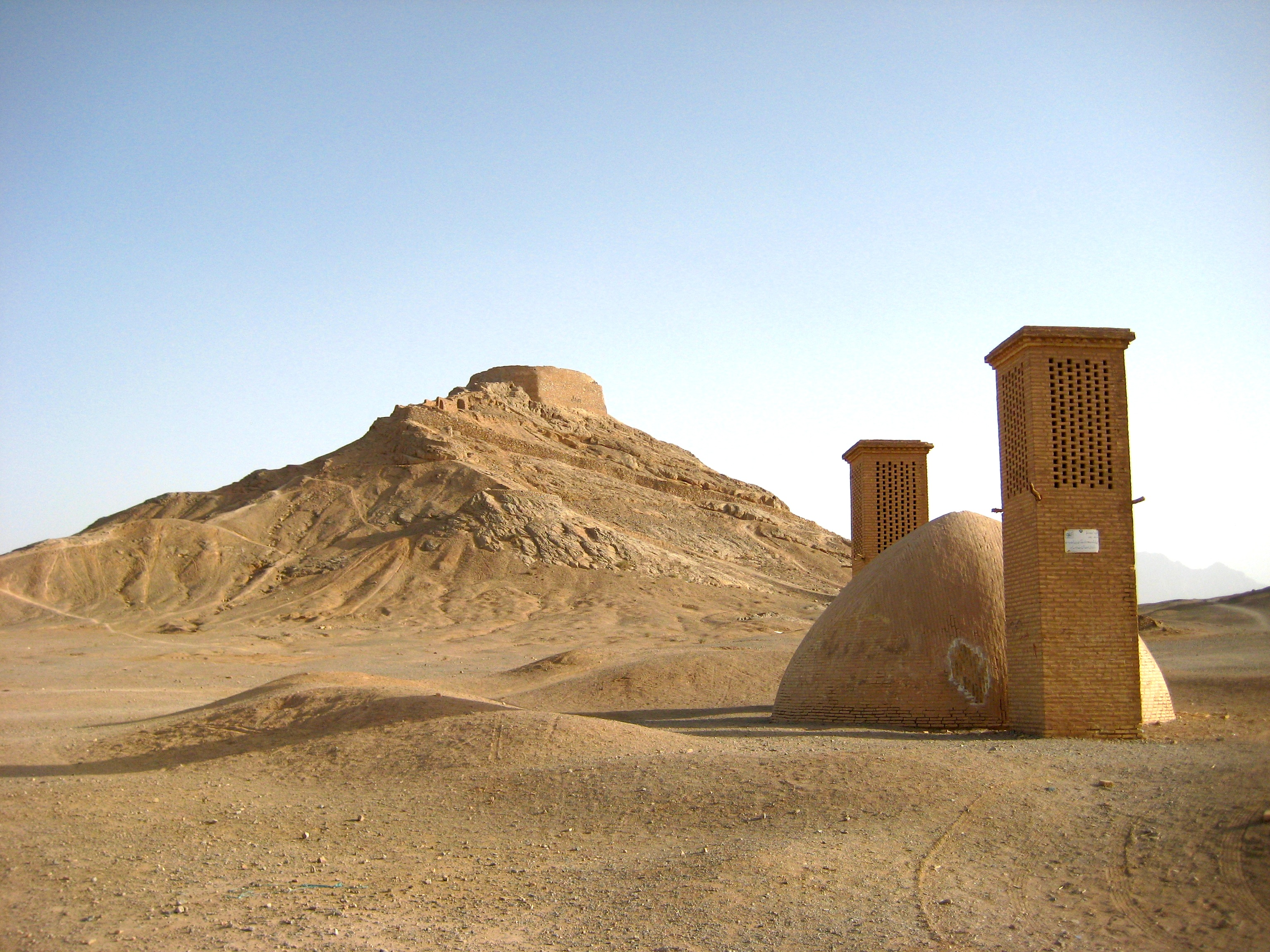
A Sasanian Windcatcher

== See also ==
- Cenmar, architect of the Khawarnaq Palace
- Achaemenid architecture
- Nakhal Fort
- Qasr Kharana
- Umayyad architecture
