= Al-Hira =

Ancient Mesopotamian city

Hira
- al-Ḥīra (Arabic)
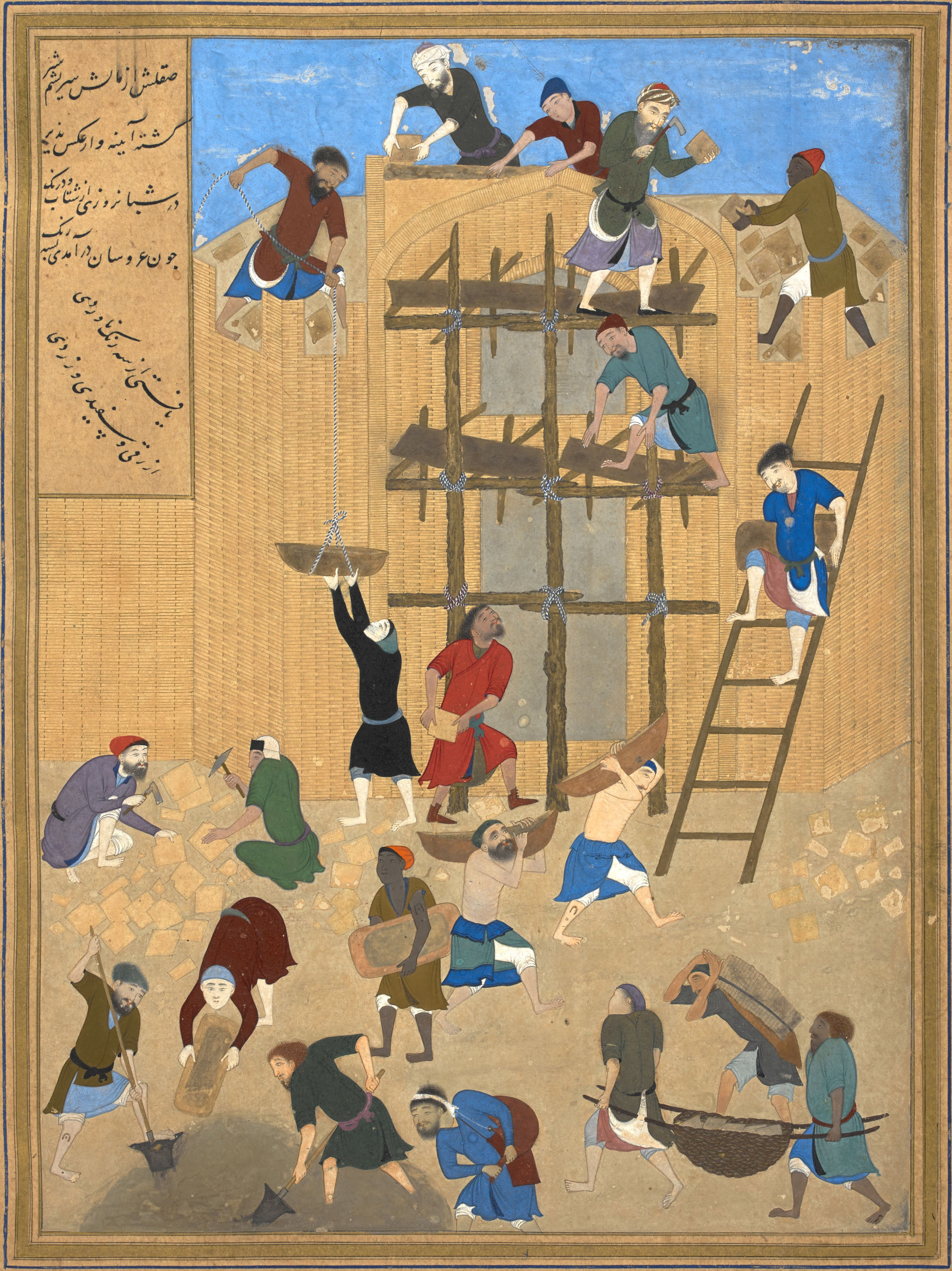
- A 15th-century Persian miniature describing the construction of Khawarnaq in Hira, the capital city of the Lakhmids; miniature painting by Kamāl ud-Dīn Behzād.

- Location within Iraq
- 31.98°N 44.39°E
- Type: Ancient city
- Periods: 3rd-7th centuries CE
- Cultures: Lakhmid, Sasanian
- Satellite of: Sasanian Empire
- Associated with: Lakhmid Arabs
- Location: Iraq
- Region: Najaf Governorate

History
- Built: 3rd century CE (Kingdom of the Lakhmids)
- Event(s): Battle of Hira (633 CE, Arab conquest of Iran)

Al-Hira (Arabic: الحيرة, romanized: al-Ḥīra Middle Persian: Hērt) was an ancient city and a major metropolis located in Mesopotamia, in what is now south-central Iraq. It was the capital city of the Lakhmid kingdom, the major Arab client kingdom of the Sasanian Empire in pre-Islamic times, between the fourth and the seventh centuries. In Islamic times, it remained inhabited until the tenth century.

Despite its major role in the history of late antiquity, little is known about its society and culture. Most histories of the city come from early Abbasid times in Islamic sources. While earlier sources are sometimes incorporated into these histories, they have also been substantially reworked to construct a legendary narrative of what was then a declining and, ultimately lost, city. Pre-Islamic Al-Hira was remembered as an urban Christian city, as a city where many of the most renowned pre-Islamic poets performed, and where a distinct musical genre was created. Al-Hira linked the Sasanian empire to the Arab lands stretching into Syria and the Arabian Peninsula.

== Etymology ==
The common view is that the name Al-Hira is derived from the Syriac word ḥērəṯā, meaning "enclosure", referring to it being the first permanent encampment of Lakhmid leadership. An alternative theory is that the etymology of the name is rooted in the Sabaic ḥwr, meaning "to settle".

Al-Hira sometimes received the epithet "the White" or "the White City", because of the vast quantity of its architecture and buildings. In Syriac sources, Al-Hira is named Ḥirtā d-Nuʿmān.

== Sources ==
Current understanding of the city of Al-Hira largely relies on literary sources, and not archaeology which remains preliminary in the area. Most of this literature represents Arabic sources from the ninth and tenth centuries, largely filtered to later authors (like Al-Tabari) through three works of Hisham ibn al-Kalbi, all of which are lost. According to Philip Wood,

the histories of al-Ḥīra pose the same set of problems for the modern commentator as the sources for seventh-century Islam; that is, they may tell us much more about the context in which they were transmitted and composed than they do about the events that they relate.

The Arabic histories were interested in a number of key themes of the Al-Hiran past, particularly "genealogies of the kings; reports (akhbār) about specific kings; divergent narratives of the Arab settlers of al-Ḥīra; tales of the foundation of its monasteries; and accounts of the deeds of its bishops".

== Geography ==
Ancient Al-Hira was located on the western bank of the Euphrates River, a few miles south of where modern-day Kufa stands. The historical site is near present-day Najaf, in what is now known as the Al-Hira Subdistrict of Al-Manathera District in Najaf Governorate.

The old city lay close to a site called Al-Najaf, which today forms part of the larger Najaf-Kufa urban area. It also encompassed areas known historically as Al-Ja'arah or Al-Ja'ara, located near the Najaf Sea, including the modern town of Abu Sukhayr. According to a 2014 estimate, the population of this area was around 37,933.

The total area of Al-Hira and its surrounding villages today is about 133 dunams (approximately 13.3 hectares). Several mosques are found throughout the region. In 1990, the municipality of Al-Hira was merged with that of Abu Sukhayr, but it was later restored as an independent local administration.

Historically, Al-Hira formed part of the so-called "Najaf Triangle," a culturally rich zone consisting of Najaf, Kufa, and Al-Hira. These cities were historically and culturally interlinked, and Najaf eventually inherited Al-Hira's urban and spiritual significance.

The city was located on the sedimentary plains of Mesopotamia, on the northwestern edge of the Samarra Desert. It is approximately 15 kilometers southwest of Kufa and about 10 kilometers southeast of Najaf. The landscape is flat and arid, situated between the Euphrates River and the seasonal lake known as the Najaf Sea.

Al-Hira's open connection to the Arabian Peninsula meant that Arab tribes could reach the city freely. Its climate was dry and healthy, influenced by its proximity to the desert. Several canals branched off from the Euphrates to irrigate the region, making it one of the most fertile and productive agricultural areas in Iraq.

== Territorial extent ==
Al-Hira ruled Arab populations from Mesopotamia, to deep into the interior of the Arabian Peninsula, especially in Eastern and Central Arabia. Instead of permanent direct rule, Al-Hira used a "divide-and-rule policy among the tribes of inner Arabia whom it threatened, cajoled, and rewarded" and Al-Hira "appointed tribesmen as kings, military leaders, and tax collectors". Al-Hira played the dual role of vassals of the Sasanians and leaders over a large Arab tribal confederation, leading to some contemporary historians calling them "dimorphic". Over the sixth century, Al-Hira ruled over Ma'add, one of the main tribal confederations of Central Arabia, vying back and forth for rule over them with Himyar.

== History ==
=== Origins and Early Days ===
The site of Al-Hira has ancient roots, with possible references dating back to the time of the Palmyrene Empire. A Roman source dated to 32 CE mentions a settlement that may correspond to Al-Hira. Other early references come from Byzantine and Syriac historians such as Stephanus of Byzantium, John of Ephesus, and Joshua the Stylite.

Despite these mentions, Al-Hira truly began to flourish with the rise of the Lakhmids, who established the city as their capital under the rule of Amr ibn Adi in the early 4th century CE. Archaeological evidence suggests that the oldest structures uncovered in Al-Hira date to the 3rd century CE.

According to Arab legends and some classical sources, earlier settlements may have existed in the area during the reign of Nebuchadnezzar II, but the city reportedly fell into ruin until Arab tribes migrated to Iraq from Tihama in Yemen. Among these migrants were the tribes of Al-Azd and Quda'a, who eventually settled and formed a confederation known as the Tanukhids. Their leader, Malik ibn Fahm, is said to have built a palace in Al-Hira and granted land to his people.

The city's importance grew rapidly under Amr ibn Adi, a prince of the Nasrid line and nephew of the legendary ruler Jadhima al-Abrash. Amr established Al-Hira as the Lakhmid capital, and it remained so until the Islamic conquest of Iraq in the 7th century.

=== Lakhmid Rule and Prosperity ===
The foundation of the Lakhmid principality in Al-Hira is credited to Amr ibn Adi, considered the first true king of the Nasrid (Lakhmid) dynasty. He was the son of Adi and nephew of the Arab ruler Jadhima al-Abrash. Born in 268 CE, Amr was raised in his uncle's household and assisted in governing. After Jadhima's death, Amr inherited control and declared Al-Hira his capital.

Amr ibn Adi took advantage of the fall of the Kingdom of Hatra to consolidate power in the region. He aligned with the Sasanian Empire and maintained that alliance through successive reigns. Upon Amr's death in 288 CE, his son Imru al-Qays I ibn Amr succeeded him and became the first Lakhmid king to convert to Christianity.

One of the most notable rulers was Al-Nu'man I ibn Imru al-Qays (403–431 CE), who gained fame for his asceticism and piety. Known as "Al-A‘war al-Sa’ih" ("the one-eyed wanderer"), he abdicated the throne, donned a monk's robe, and devoted himself to spiritual life. He is credited with constructing the famed palaces of Al-Khawarnaq and Al-Sadir, the former supposedly built under order from the Sasanian king Yazdegerd I.

The Lakhmid court reached its height of cultural and military influence under Al-Nu'man III ibn al-Mundhir (580–602 CE). The court in Al-Hira rivaled that of major empires, attracting poets such as Al-Nabigha al-Dhubyani and Hassan ibn Thabit. The Lakhmids maintained an organized military with elite units like the “al-Dawsar” cavalry, known for their strength and precision in battle.

However, tensions with the Sasanians grew, and after Al-Nu’man III converted to Christianity and defied Sasanian orders, he was removed from power. The kingdom was absorbed into the Sasanian Empire in 602 CE, marking the end of Lakhmid rule.

=== Islamic Conquest and Abbasid Period ===
Al-Hira was conquered by Muslim forces in 633 CE during the early Islamic expansion into Mesopotamia. The city surrendered peacefully after a brief siege led by Khalid ibn al-Walid, commander of the Rashidun Caliphate's army. Al-Hira was one of the first major urban centers to fall under Muslim control in Iraq.

Despite losing its political significance to the newly established city of Kufa—founded in 638 CE just a few miles to the north—Al-Hira remained inhabited during the early Islamic period and played a role in several historical events.

Throughout the Umayyad and Abbasid eras, various caliphs and dignitaries visited or temporarily resided in Al-Hira. Among them were Abu al-Abbas al-Saffah, the first Abbasid caliph, and Harun al-Rashid, who visited the city multiple times and established a temporary residence there.

Al-Hira retained some of its population and importance until the 10th century, after which it gradually declined. The Mongol invasion and the Sack of Baghdad (1258) marked the final end of the city's historical presence. Some of its inhabitants later migrated to other cities, including Nishapur in Khorasan, which had a quarter named after Al-Hira.

By the 13th century, Al-Hira had effectively ceased to exist as a functioning city, leaving behind ruins and cultural memory.

== Culture and literature ==
Al-Hira was a vibrant cultural center, particularly during the Lakhmid era. The city was renowned for its promotion of poetry, literature, education, and religious scholarship. Its rulers actively supported poets, theologians, and intellectuals, offering them patronage and a platform at court.

Numerous schools and religious institutions flourished in the city, contributing to its reputation as a major seat of learning in pre-Islamic Arabia. One of the notable poets who studied in Al-Hira was al-Muraqqish al-Akbar. Children from nearby villages, such as al-Naqira, attended classes to learn reading and writing. The script used in Al-Hira, known as the Hiri script, was a derivative of the Aramaic alphabet and is considered a precursor to the Arabic script.

Due to its strategic location between Mesopotamia, the Levant, and the Arabian Peninsula, Al-Hira was a crossroads of various civilizations, and it was a highly multilingual city, with speakers of Aramaic, Arabic, and Persian.

. Its inhabitants absorbed cultural influences from the Persians, Syriacs, and Greeks, enriching their own traditions in literature, philosophy, and art.

Lakhmid rulers, especially kings like al-Nu'man III, hosted gatherings for poets and scholars in palaces such as Al-Khawarnaq. These gatherings were considered prestigious festivals and helped solidify Al-Hira's reputation as a literary hub.

Al-Hira was also a center of medical knowledge, with several notable physicians originating from the city. In the Islamic period, the legacy of Hiri scholarship continued, with prominent figures like Hunayn ibn Ishaq—a Christian physician and translator—tracing his roots to the city.

== Religion ==
The Lakhmids were pagan, but this began to change with the growth of Christianity in the kingdom. Eventually, the final Lakhmid king, al-Nu'man III ibn al-Mundhir, converted to Christianity.

Initially, the Lakhmids, affiliated with the Zoroastrian Sasanian Empire, originally had a volatile relationship with their Christian minority, shifting between phases of acceptance and open persecution depending on the state of relations with Christian Romans. An attitude of tolerance also grew as, during the fifth century, Christianity became a larger and larger religion in the Persian realm. Instead, an independent Persian Church was fostered, dogmatically independent of the Roman Church. The same trend followed in the Lakhmid capital, in Al-Hira. Christianity was introduced in the fourth century into the city, and its growth by the fifth and sixth centuries, as well as the Christianization of the Hiran urban elite, turned patterns of persecution into a broader tolerance. By 410 AD, Al-Hira had a bishop.

Christianity went on to have a long history at the Lakhmid capital Al-Hira, even before the conversion of the final ruler. Al-Hira became a major base for missionary activity, acting as a gateway for launching missions to the rest of the Sasanian world, on the one hand, and the Arabs of the desert, on the other. Some of the most detailed information about the Christianity of the Lakhmid A-Hira comes from the Chronicle of Seert which, despite its late final date, is likely a redaction of multiple earlier records, including some written down very close to the events. (Independent records for this history are also found in the Khuzistan Chronicle and the Arabo-Islamic tradition.) The Chronicle records the missionary activities of the great monastic founder, Abraham of Kashkar, at Al-Hira. It also talks about how many of the Lakhmid kings engaged with the Christian presence of the city, and a long account of the final king, who did convert.

Al-Nu'man III's conversion is said to have been precipitated by Simeon Jabara, the bishop of Al-Hira. The Persians did not look favorably on this conversion, and made efforts to reconvert him out of his new faith.

Before him, Al-Mundhir III, in the mid-6th century, had already married the princess Hind of the Hujrid dynasty of the Kingdom of Kinda. While he did not become a Christian, Hind converted to Christianity, and even sponsored the construction of a monastery in the Lakhmid capital.

== Economy ==
The economy of Al-Hira thrived during the Lakhmid period, largely based on agriculture, craftsmanship, and trade. The fertile plains surrounding the city benefited from irrigation systems connected to the Euphrates River, supporting the cultivation of various crops and the raising of livestock.

The city hosted vibrant markets and was a center for regional trade. Merchants from Al-Hira participated in the famed Souk Okaz and maintained commercial ties with cities across the Arabian Peninsula, Mesopotamia, and the Levant. Trade caravans from India, China, Oman, and Bahrain passed through Al-Hira, carrying goods such as textiles, spices, and perfumes.

Al-Hira was particularly known for its high-quality textile industry, producing fine fabrics of silk, wool, and linen. These textiles were sometimes embroidered with gold thread or decorated with intricate patterns. The city also excelled in metalwork, including the production of swords, spears, and other weapons, which gained renown across the Arab world.

Local artisans specialized in pottery, jewelry-making, woodwork, and leather tanning. Goldsmiths crafted intricate ornaments using gold, silver, and precious stones. The city was also famous for its glazed ceramics and items made from ivory.

Another notable economic feature of Al-Hira was its wine production. Christian and Jewish communities were involved in the fermentation and sale of wine, particularly the celebrated “Abbadian wine,” which became a well-known product associated with the region.

The prosperity generated by these industries allowed the city's elite to live in luxury, as reflected in the richly decorated houses, elegant garments, and refined urban lifestyle. The wealth accumulated from trade and craftsmanship contributed to the city's cultural and architectural development.

== Architecture ==
In its Islamic reception, Al-Hira was famous forits architectural legacy. Al-Hira was the home of a constellation of monasteries and convents, so impressive that a work was written about them by Hisham ibn al-Kalbi. Among the most famous of them were the Monastery of Hind the Elder and the Monastery of Hind the Younger, both built in the space of a few generations in the second half of the sixth century. Also famous is the Khawarnaq castle, which appears in some medieval lists of the "Wonders of the World". Khawarnaq was a legendary royal palace said to have been constructed for Yazdegerd I by the Lakhmid king al-Nu’man I. After it was finished, the architect Senemar was said to have been killed so that he could never build a similar palace for any other ruler.

== Archaeology ==
So far, Al-Hira has not been subjected to extensive archaeological analysis, although preliminary work has been done through the decades. The archaeology of Al-Hira has not substantially progressed past the work of Talbot Rice in the 1930s. Adam Talib summarized the main findings from this work as of 2013:

The preliminary archaeological investigations verify the historical accounts and literary evidence and testify to al-Ḥīra’s urban character. Art historians have debated al-Ḥīra’s influence on later Abbāsid architectural styles, and, although the issue is far from settled, it is clear that Ḥīran architecture was developed enough to have been at least a plausible candidate for a model. Archaeological evidence has also emphasised al-Ḥīra’s Christian heritage, by locating at least two churches with surviving frescoes and plaster crosses, in addition to Syriac inscriptions.

== See also ==
- Abda of Hira
- Lakhmid kingdom
- Kingdom of Hatra

== Sources ==
- Bosworth, C. E., ed. (1999). The History of al-Ṭabarī, Volume V: The Sāsānids, the Byzantines, the Lakhmids, and Yemen. SUNY Series in Near Eastern Studies. Albany, New York: State University of New York Press. ISBN 978-0-7914-4355-2.
- Bosworth, Clifford Edmund (2003). "Ḥira". In Yarshater, Ehsan (ed.). Encyclopædia Iranica. Vol. XII/3: Herat VII–Historiography III. London and New York: Routledge & Kegan Paul. pp. 322–323. ISBN 978-0-933273-76-4.
- Daryaee, Touraj (2002). Šahrestānīhā Ī Ērānšahr. Mazda Publishers. pp. 1–81. ISBN 1568591438.
- Debie, Muriel (2024). "The Arabs and Northern Languages and Scripts before Islam". In Vacca, Alison; Borrut, Antoine; Ceballos, Manuela (eds.). Navigating Language in the Early Islamic World: Multilingualism and Language Change in the First Centuries of Islam. Brepols. pp. 195–257.
- Fisher, Greg (2019). Rome, Persia, and Arabia: Shaping the Middle East from Pompey to Muhammad. Routledge.
- Martindale, John R., ed. (1992). The Prosopography of the Later Roman Empire: Volume III, AD 527–641. Cambridge: Cambridge University Press. p. 258. ISBN 0-521-20160-8.
- Munt, Harry (2015). "Arabic and Persian Sources for Pre-Islamic Arabia". In Fisher, Greg (ed.). Arabs and Empires before Islam. Oxford University Press. pp. 437–500.
- Talib, Adam (2013). "Topoi and Topography in the Histories of al-Ḥīra" (PDF). In Wood, Philip (ed.). History and Identity in the Late Antique Near East. Oxford University Press. pp. 123–147.
- Toral-Niehoff, Isabel (2013). "Late Antique Iran and the Arabs: The Case of al-Hira*". Journal of Persianate Studies. 6 (1–2). Brill: 115–126. doi:10.1163/18747167-12341252.
- Toral-Niehoff, Isabel (2018). "Imperial Contests and the Arabs: The World of Late Antiquity on the Eve of Islam" (PDF). In Salvatore, Armando; Rahimi, Babak; Attar, Fariduddin; Patel, Naznin; Tottoli, Roberto (eds.). The Wiley Blackwell History of Islam. Wiley-Blackwell. pp. 59–76.
- Wood, Philip (2016). "Al-Ḥīra and Its Histories". Journal of the American Oriental Society. 136 (4): 785–799. doi:10.7817/jameroriesoci.136.4.0785. JSTOR 10.7817/jameroriesoci.136.4.0785.
