= Monastery of Hind =

The Monastery of Hind may refer to:

- Monastery of Hind the Elder, a monastery built in the capital of the Lakhmid kingdom, Al-Hira
- Monastery of Hind the Younger, a monastery built near Kufa the great-granddaughter of the elder Hind, who carried the same name
