= Abda of Hira =

Assyrian Church of the East monk

- Died: 680
- Venerated in: Assyrian Church of the East

Abda of Hira (died 680) was a monk of the Church of the East.

He was born at Al-Hirah, the son of Hanif. He became a monk under Mar Abda of Gamre. After having taught as a disciple by Mar Babai, he later lived in a cave. One of his miraculous actions was to have treated a wound of a hunter who had been injured by a lion with healing oil. He preached Christianity to the Zoroastrian Persians and was said to have performed many miracles before dying in his cave in 680.

== Sources ==
- Fowden, Elizabeth Key (1999). The Barbarian Plain: Saint Sergius Between Rome and Iran. Los Angeles, USA: University of California Press, Ltd. p. 121.
