= Hujrids =

Ruling dynasty in Central Arabia

The Hujrids or the Hujrid dynasty was a ruling lineage associated with the Kingdom of Kinda in central Arabia during Late Antiquity, roughly from the fifth to the early sixth century CE. The founder was a ruler named Ḥugr b. ʿAmr (known in Arabic tradition as Ākil al-Murār), and Hujrid is a modern scholarly designation used for the royal dynasty and succession of rulers that descended from him.

The dynasty is best known through South Arabian inscriptions and Greco-Roman sources, which depict the Hujrids as client rulers operating within the sphere of influence of the Himyarite Kingdom while also engaging diplomatically and militarily with the Byzantine and Sasanian empires. Although traditionally linked to the tribe of Kinda, the precise nature of the relationship between the Hujrid rulers and the wider Kindite population remains unclear. Modern scholarship views the Hujrids as an intermediary dynasty whose authority extended over broader Arab groupings, particularly Ma'add, rather than over Kinda alone.

== History ==
=== Origins and identity ===
The Hujrids appear to have originated from Kinda, but their later relationship to the Kindite tribe is uncertain. While early evidence suggests a Kindite background, the dynasty’s political role seems to have evolved beyond tribal leadership into a form of supra-tribal rulership encouraged or tolerated by Himyarite authorities. This ambiguity mirrors similar distinctions drawn between other Late Antique Arab dynasties and the tribes with which they were originally associated.

South Arabian inscriptions attest to a ruler named Ḥujr (fully: Ḥugr b. ʿAmr), identified with the title mlk kdt (“king of Kinda”), indicating that the dynasty retained an ideological or symbolic association with Kinda even while operating under Himyarite dominance. Hujr founded a royal dynasty through his descendants, and modern scholars designate this royal dynasty using the term the Hujrids.

=== Falling under Himyarite rule ===
Following the annexation of the Sabaeans by the Himyarite kingdom in the late third century, Himyar emerged as the dominant power in southern Arabia and gradually extended its influence northward. The Hujrids appear within this context as rulers installed or supported by Himyar to control Arab populations in central and northern Arabia, particularly the group known as Ma'add. Ma'add, traditionally interpreted as a tribe, is now seen as a tribal confederation and an ethno-cultural designation instead. In any case, the Hujrids thus appear to have acted as intermediaries through whom Himyar managed Ma'add and countered Roman and Sasanian influence in the deserts of the peninsula.

An inscription from Maʾsal al-Jumḥ, dated to the fifth century, has been interpreted as commemorating a Himyarite expedition into the "land of Ma'add" and the installation of Ḥujr of Kinda as ruler over that population. This suggests that the Hujrids functioned as Himyarite clients whose authority was designed to project Himyarite power into the Arabian interior.

Despite this dependence, the Hujrids are notably absent from Himyarite royal titulature, implying that their authority may not have rested solely on Himyarite patronage. Scholars have therefore suggested that the Hujrids exercised a degree of autonomous power, even while benefiting from Himyarite support.

=== Late fifth century after the reign of Hujr ===
After the reign of Ḥujr, the dynasty continued for at least two further generations. His son ʿAmr succeeded him, followed in the sixth century by a ruler named al-Ḥārith. Al-Ḥārith is attested in Roman sources as a significant regional powerbroker who negotiated directly with the Byzantine emperor Anastasius.

Al-Ḥārith is reported to have threatened, and possibly attacked, the Lakhmid capital of al-Ḥīra, demonstrating the wide geographical reach of Hujrid power. He was eventually killed in 528 CE by the Lakhmid ruler al-Mundhir, marking a turning point in the dynasty’s fortunes.

=== Falling under Roman rule ===
From the early sixth century, the Hujrids became increasingly entangled in Roman diplomacy. Byzantine sources describe Roman attempts to recruit the Hujrids as allies against the Sasanians and their Arab clients, the Naṣrids. These efforts formed part of a broader Roman strategy to establish buffer zones and secure trade routes across Arabia.

Following the death of al-Ḥārith, a ruler named Qays (Kaïsos in Byzantine sources), described as a descendant of al-Ḥārith and "leader of Kinda and Ma'add", received a Roman embassy and later visited Constantinople to visit the emperor Justinian I. Justinian, concerned over the penetrance of Persian and Lakhmid influence over much of the Arabian Peninsula, sought to establish his own network of client powers across the region. After visiting Constantinople, Qays agreed to become the phylarch over the Byzantine Palestinian territories, with his brothers acting as the Byzantine phylarchs ruling over Central Arabia. Several factors may have allowed this, one being the decline of Himyarite influence over the region. In any case, Central Arabia came under the sway of Byzantine power in the early-to-mid sixth century.

=== Decline and disappearance ===
After the mid-sixth century, the Hujrids fade from the historical record. Roman sources cease to mention them, coinciding with the rise of the Jafnid dynasty as Rome’s preferred Arab allies and the increasing influence of the Naṣrids in central Arabia.

Later Himyarite inscriptions indicate that Ma'add came under Naṣrid leadership, while Himyar itself struggled to maintain control over its former client rulers. The decline of the Hujrids is therefore generally understood as part of the broader collapse of Himyarite authority in Arabia rather than as an isolated dynastic failure.

== Religion ==
The religious beliefs of the Hujrids, for the most part, are unknown. However, in the early sixth century, the Hujrid princess Hind, living in Al-Hira after her marriage to the Lakhmid king, builds a monastery, as attested by the Dayr Hind inscription engraved onto the building:

This monastery was built by Hind bint al Hareth ibn ʿAmro ibn Ḥujr, the queen daughter of kings, and the mother of king ʿAmro ibn al Munther, handmaiden of Christ, and the mother of his slave, and the daughter of his slave, in the time of the king of kings, Khasrū anū Sherwan, and in the time of bishop Aphraem- May the God to whom she built this house forgive her trespasses, and have mercy on her and her son, and accept them both and to give them strength to establish justice: and may God be with her and her son for ever and ever.

The inscription is only known from written sources that recorded it in medieval times, but multiple lines of evidence support its authenticity. The Christian religion of the princess Hind, despite the fact that her royal husband (Al-Mundhir III) is not himself a Christian, suggests that the Hujrid dynasty converted to Christianity by the early sixth century, around the time that the Hujrid dynasty became clients of the Byzantine empire.

== Historical significance ==
The Hujrid dynasty provides a key example of how Late Antique Arabian polities were shaped by imperial competition. Acting between Himyar, Rome, and the Sasanians, the Hujrids illustrate the ways in which local dynasties could leverage imperial patronage to build regional power, while remaining vulnerable to shifts in broader geopolitical structures.

In later Islamic memory, the princess Hind became one of the most memorable characters of the Hujrid world: she became the wife of Al-Mundhir III, the king of the Lakhmid kingdom, and built the Monastery of Hind the Elder in the city of Al-Hira.
