= Monastery of Hind the Elder =

Lakhmid monastery in Al-Hira

The Monastery of Hind the Elder (Dayr Hind al-Kubrā) was a monastery of the city of Al-Hira in Mesopotamia, capital of the Lakhmid kingdom (present-day Iraq). The monastery is named after Hind, who was the wife of the Lakhmid king Al-Mundhir III and the daughter of al-Harith ibn Amr, the most famous king of the Kingdom of Kinda of Central Arabia. It is named after the Hujrid princess, Hind, who sponsored its construction, recorded by the Dayr Hind inscription.

The Kindite role in sponsoring the monastery documents the spread of Christianity in pre-Islamic Arabia, including into Central Arabia in the 6th century, particularly among the Kindite leadership in the 6th century. This was one of many monasteries and convents in Al-Hira, forming a network so extensive that a dedicated work was written to this constellation of Christian architectures by Hisham ibn al-Kalbi (d. 819).

The Monastery of Hind must be distinguished from other monasteries of the same name: Hind's grand-grand daughter, also named Hind, sponsored her own monastery near Kufa, called the Monastery of Hind the Younger, or Dayr Hind al-Ṣughrā. (Yet another Dayr Hind was built by the Ghassanids.)

== The Dayr Hind inscription ==
The monastery is associated with the Dayr Hind inscription. The inscription does not survive, but was recorded by two contemporary Arab geographers: Al-Bakri, in the eleventh century, and Yaqut al-Hamawi, living in the twelfth and thirteenth centuries. The inscription, engraved onto the lintel of a chapel in the monastery, read:

This monastery was built by Hind bint al Hareth ibn ʿAmro ibn Ḥujr, the queen daughter of kings, and the mother of king ʿAmro ibn al Munther, handmaiden of Christ, and the mother of his slave, and the daughter of his slave, in the time of the king of kings, Khasrū anū Sherwan, and in the time of bishop Aphraem- May the God to whom she built this house forgive her trespasses, and have mercy on her and her son, and accept them both and to give them strength to establish justice: and may God be with her and her son for ever and ever.

There is some independent evidence that supports the credibility of this report, besides its attestation by the two geographers. First, it refers to the bishop Ephrem, a known contemporary of the time period of the construction. Second, to spell the name or word for God, it uses the construction al-ilāh instead of Allāh. The importance of this is that Christian, Paleo-Arabic 6th-century inscriptions more commonly used this construction, rather than Allāh, to write "God", a convention that quickly declined in the early Islamic centuries, whereas Allāh was the universal Arabic spelling of Muslim authors in Islamic times. Third, another Hind, the sister of the Lakhmid king Al-Nu'man III (r. 582–602), is also documented by the Khuzistan Chronicle to have sponsored the construction of another monastery.

The monastery, and its inscription, have important historical implications: the inscription is the only possibly contemporary evidence for the spread of Christianity into Central Arabia, the home of the Kingdom of Kinda, where Hind came from. Irfan Shahîd argues that the inscription shows that the Kindite kingdom was partly or fully Christianized at this time. Given Lakhmid dominion over large parts of Eastern Arabia, other historians, such as Robert G. Hoyland and Timothy Power have suggested that this inscription provides evidence that the Lakhmids may have also been involved in sponsoring the extensive monastic scene in the area, uncovered through a large series of archaeological findings, such as the Church of the East monastery on Sir Bani Yas.

== In Islamic memory ==
One story, set in the ninth-century, centers around the decaying state of the once-glorious monasteries of the older and younger Hind's and the testimony it gives to the fall of once-great powers. The caliph Harun al-Rashid visits the monastery of the younger Hind, and then that of the older Hind. Upon witnessing them, one author includes an eight-line verse:

The line of al-Mundhir has come to nought / Where once the monks raised churches. / Perfumed behind the ears with musk / And amber one would mix with wine, / Silk and linen were their robes; / No one could make them wear wool. / Glory and kingship were their due, / And wine strained through cloth. / Lo, but they’ve faded and no one asks them / For charity anymore; the timid no longer dread. / It’s as if they were only a toy— / Where has the rider taken them to? / They’ve become—after once being blessed— / like all other ordinary men. / The one who outlives them has it worst of all, / He’s helpless and put upon; his fortune run out.

== See also ==
- Khawarnaq
