= Timothy Power =

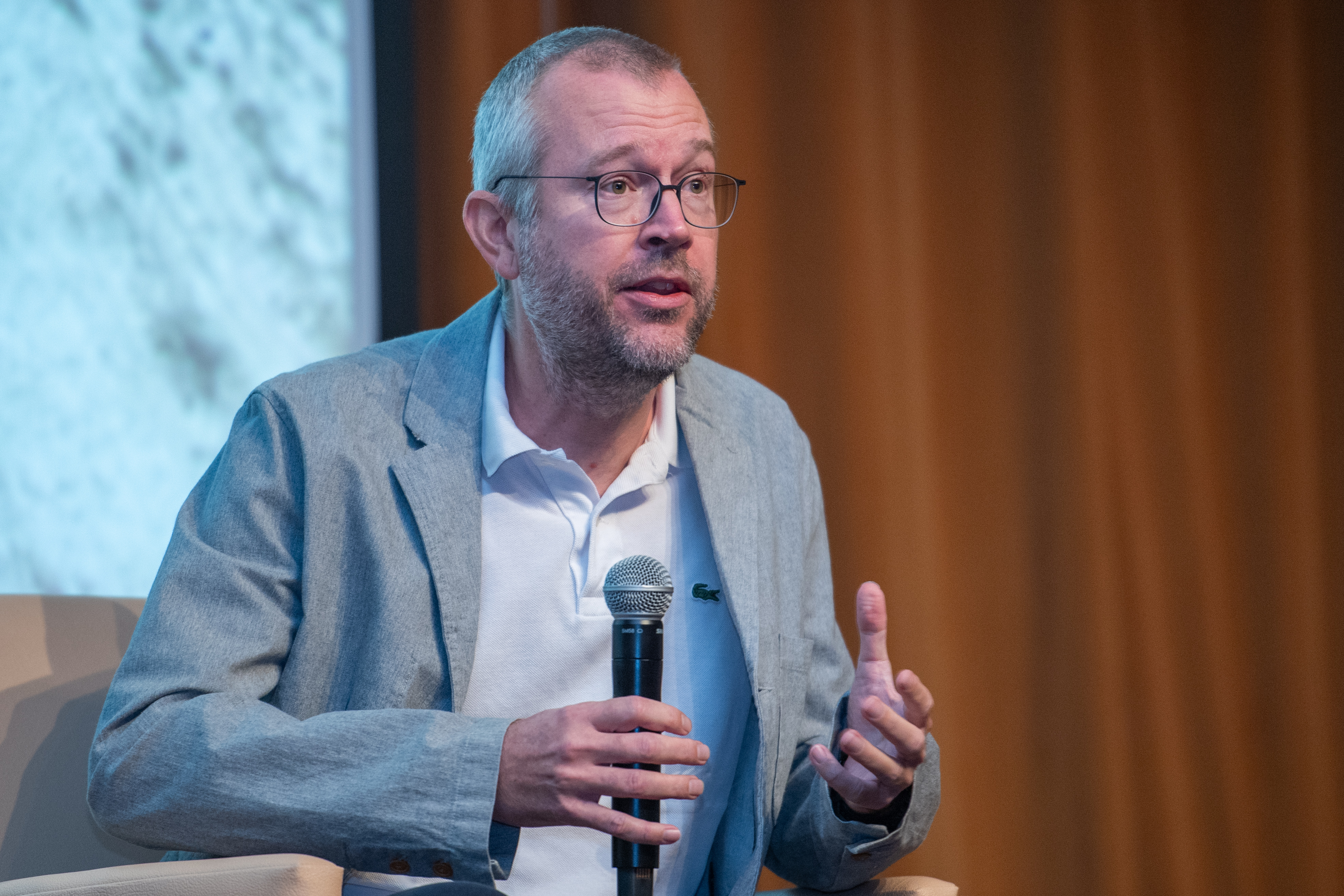
- Occupation: Associate Professor of Archaeology

Academic background
- Education: University of Oxford

Academic work
- Discipline: Archaeology of Arabia and The Islamic World
- Institutions: United Arab Emirates University

Timothy Power is an archaeologist who specializes in Arabia and the Islamic World. He completed his doctorate in Islamic Art and Archaeology at the University of Oxford in 2003. His doctorate focused on the Red Sea basin from Byzantium to the Caliphate, which was later published as a book by the American University of Cairo (AUC) Press.

He is currently an associate professor of archaeology at the United Arab Emirates University (UAEU).

== Career ==
Power's interest in archaeology was prompted by his relocation to Cairo in 2001. There, he published a historical guidebook on Alexandria and participated in a digging of the Eastern Desert of Egypt. Afterwards, he began his extensive travels around the Islamic world before pursuing his studies in archaeology at the University of Oxford.

He moved to the United Arab Emirates in 2009, where he worked as a consultant for the Department of Culture and Tourism and worked on historical excavations in the oases of Al-Ain. Then, he worked as a lecturer in archaeology at UCL Qatar, before working as an associate professor at Zayed University (ZU) in Abu Dhabi. He was appointed as an associate professor at the United Arab Emirates University (UAEU) in Al-Ain in 2021.

His archaeological research primarily centers on the exploration of al-Ain oases and the Umm al-Quwain lagoon. He specializes in studying ceramics from the Islamic period in the Persian Gulf. He has conducted extensive research and excavation work at various sites within the United Arab Emirates, including Qattara Arts Centre, Qasr al-Muwaij‘i, al-Ain Museum, Qasr al-Hosn, Saadiyat Island, Hisn al-Sira, Jazirat al-Hamra, Masafi Oasis, Hatta Dam, and Sinniya Island. Additionally, he has led archaeological projects in both Buraimi and Zanzibar.

=== Al-Sinniya Island Archaeology Project ===
Power is the co-director of the Sinniya Island Archaeology Project, which is a project that aims to run archaeological explorations of Al-Sinniya Island in Umm Al Quwain. As a result of their explorations, in 2022, the group of archaeologists discovered an ancient Christian monastery on the island, shedding light on the Christian communities that were living in East Arabia. This is the second discovered monastery in the UAE after the discovery of one on Sir Bani Yas Island in Abu Dhabi in the 1990s.

The group discovered what they believe to be the oldest pearling town in the gulf region, on Sinniya Island. Power stated that despite there being other pearling settlements in the region, this one is particularly unique for its age, size, and - most importantly - it is not seasonal; it operated year-round.

== Publications ==
Notable publications by Power include:

- The ‘Arabians’ of Pre-Islamic Egypt (Chapter in Natural Resources and Cultural Connections of the Red Sea) - 2007
- The Origin and Development of the Sudanese Ports (‘Aydhâb, Bâ/di ‘, Sawâkin) in the early Islamic Period (Journal Article in Chroniques Yéménites) - 2008
- The Expansion of Muslim Commerce in the Red Sea Basin, c. AD 833-969 (Conference Paper from the Connected Hinterlands: Proceedings of Red Sea Project IV conference) - 2009
- The Red Sea Region during the 'Long' Late Antiquity, AD 500-1000 (Book) - 2010
- The Bayt Bin ʿĀtī in Qaṭṭārah Oasis: A Prehistoric Industrial Site and the Formation of the Oasis Landscape of al-ʿAin, UAE (Proceedings of the Seminar for Arabian Studies Volume 41) - 2011
- A preliminary ceramic chronology for the late Islamic period in the al-ʿAin oases, UAE (Conference Paper) - 2011
- The Qaṣr al-Muwaijʿī: Diwān of the Āl Nahayyān in the al-ʿAin / Buraimi Oasis (Article in Liwa: Journal of the National Center for Documentation and Research) - 2011
- The Red Sea from Byzantium to the Caliphate, AD 500-1000 (Book) - 2012
- The origin and development of the oasis landscape of al-ʿAin (UAE) (Proceedings of the Seminar for Arabian Studies) - 2012
- Trade Cycles and Settlement Patterns in the Red Sea Region (c. AD 1050–1250) (Navigated Spaces, Connected Places: Proceedings of Red Sea Project V) - 2012
- ‘You shall not see the tribes of the Blemmyes or of the Saracens’: On the Other ‘Barbarians’ of Late Roman Eastern Desert of Egypt - 2012
- The Material Culture and Economic Rationale of Saracen Settlement in pre-Islamic Egypt - 2012
- Archaeological Survey at Buraymī Oasis, Oman. An Integrated Strategy for Geophysics, Surface Collection and Test Pitting - 2014
- Iron Age Copper Smelting At Bayt Bin'Ātī In The Qattārah Oasis (al-'ain, Uae): A Preliminary Study (Conference Paper) - 2014
- Buraimi Oasis Landscape Archaeology Project 2014 - 2015
- First Preliminary Report on the Buraimi Oasis Landscape Archaeology Project - 2015
- First preliminary report on the Buraimi oasis landscape archaeology project (Proceedings of the Seminar for Arabian Studies) - 2015
- A first ceramic chronology for the late Islamic Arabian Gulf (Article in The Journal of Islamic Archaeology) - 2015
- Al Ain Oases Mapping Project: Qaṭṭārah Oasis, past and present (poster) (Proceedings of the Seminar for Arabian Studies) - 2016
- Al-'Ayn Oases Mapping project: Jīmī Oasis (poster) - 2017
- Julfar and the ports of northern Oman (Studies on Ibadism and Oman, Ports of Oman) - 2017
- The Red Sea under the Caliphal Dynasties, c. 639–1171 (Journal Article in History Compass) - 2018
- Al-ʿAyn Oases Mapping Project: al-Hīlī Oasis 2017 (Proceedings of the Seminar for Arabian Studies) - 2018
- The Role of Indian Ocean Trade Inland: The Buraimi Oasis - 2018
- Defining new technological traditions of Late Islamic Arabia: a view on Bahlā Ware from al-Ain (UAE) and the lead-barium glaze production (Article in the Journal of Archaeological and Anthropological Sciences) - 2019
- An Iron Age ceramic sequence from the Bayt Bin Ati, al‐Ain, UAE - 2019
- Excavations at the old fort of stone town, Zanzibar: New evidence of historic interactions between the Swahili Coast and Arabian Gulf - 2020
- Abraham's luggage: a social life of things in the medieval Indian Ocean world - 2020
- Al Madam and the Archaeology of the Falaj - 2021
- Archaeological Survey of Sīnīya Island, Umm al-Quwain - 2022
- A Newly Discovered Late Antique Monastery and Islamic Town on Sīnīya Island, Umm al-Quwain - 2023
- The Oman Border Fence Project 2021: A Journey through the Hydraulic, Agricultural and Funerary Landscapes of al-ʿAyn - 2023
