= Khawarnaq =

Sassanian palace in al-Hira, Lakhmid Kingdom

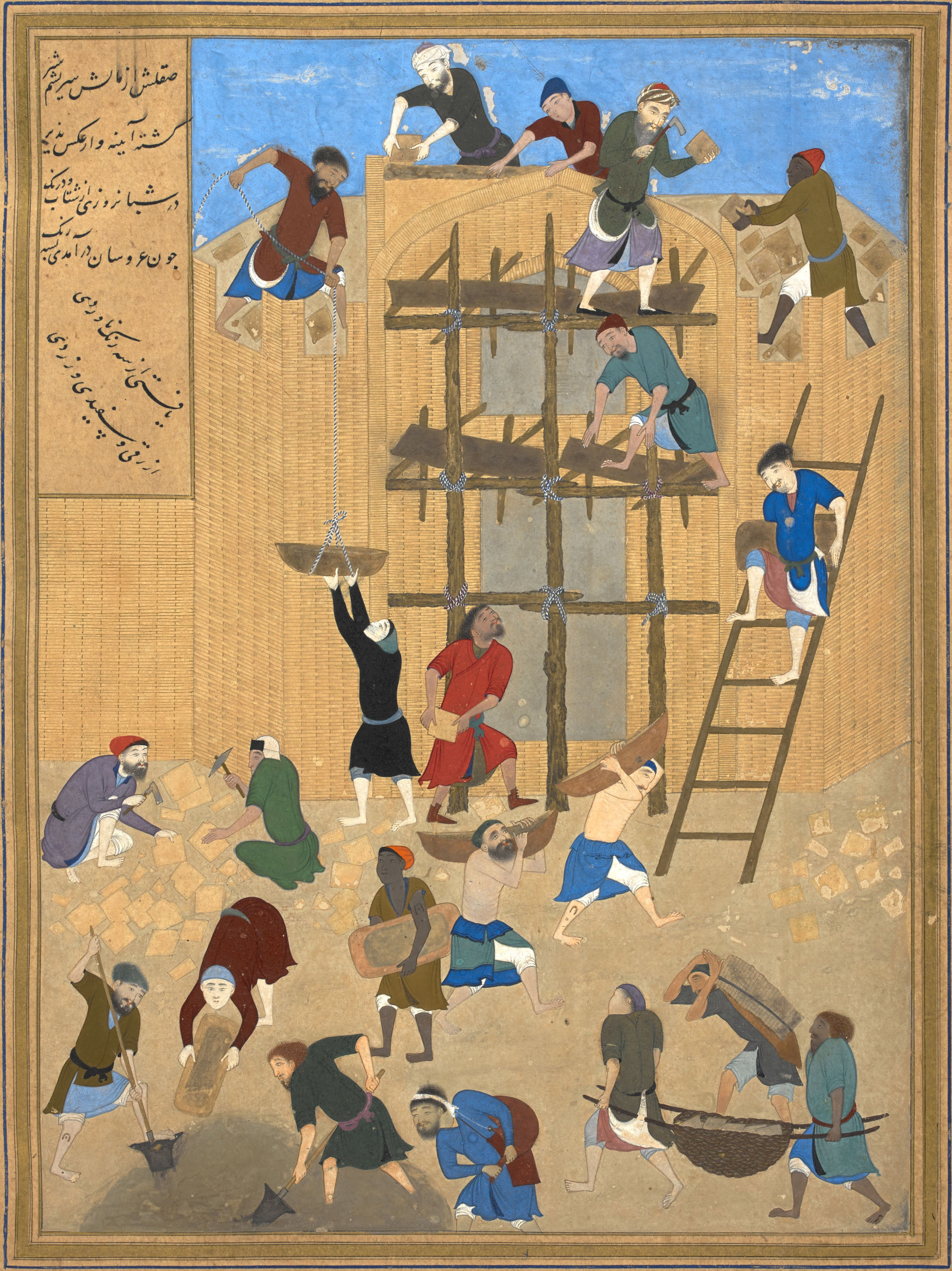
Persian miniature illustrating the construction of Khawarnaq

Khawarnaq was a medieval, pre-Islamic Arab castle built by the Lakhmids near their capital al-Hira. It is celebrated in the Arabic-Islamic literature and poetry as one of the "Thirty Wonders of the World". It is described in both Arabic and Persian sources, but "it seems quite impossible to distinguish clearly between historical facts and legendary accounts".

According to tradition, the Sasanian emperor Yazdegerd I is the one who requested its construction, asking the ruler of the Lakhmid kingdom (a client state of the Sasanians), Al-Nu'man I, to carry out the construction in the early fifth century, and for it to be a place for the young Sasanian prince Bahram V to be able to grow up in. Later, during Abbasid times, the castle was enlarged.

The design of Khawarnaq was created by the legendary architect Senemar. After completing the design, the architect was killed, to prevent him from designing a similar castle for another person.

== Etymology ==
The etymology or origins of the name, Khawarnaq, is unresolved. Al-Asmaʿi speculated it was a Persian loanword into Arabic, ḵu(w)ran-qāh, meaning "place of eating and drinking". Khalil ibn Ahmad suggested it derives from an Arabic word, ḵerneq meaning "young hare" or "leveret". Theodor Nöldeke agreed that the term has a Persian origins, linking it to the Talmudic aḵwarneqa, meaning "pergola" or "summerhouse". Other theories exist, usually also siding with a Persian background.

== Archaeological evidence ==
The Khawarnaq already entered ruin in the medieval period. Ibn Battuta (d. 1369) claims, visiting the site, that the only thing he found were the "remains of colossal domes".

The Khawarnaq palace may have been discovered, but its archaeological remains are "scanty" and its identification uncertain:

It apparently lies to the east of al-Ḥīra, a few kilometres outside the settlement. Massignon, in 1907–8, was not even sure that he had correctly found the site. Musil identified the site more confidently and published a rough plan of the structure, the accuracy of which is difficult to assess. It measures some 50 x 80 m and is apparently composed of two parts with rectangular plans; the northern part seems to include a wide hall terminated by an apse. Without further archaeological work, it is almost impossible to connect the plan of this ruin with the literary evidence.

== Story of construction ==
The standard account for the story of the construction of Khawarnaq is the following: the Sasanian emperor Yazdegerd I was facing a dire problem. All his children were dying, for one reason or another. Eventually, another heir to the Sasanian throne, Bahram V, is born, and Yazdegerd is determined to ensure that Bahram survives. For this reason, he entrusts the Al-Nu'man I, with the task of raising him in the royal Lakhmid court. Al-Nu'man, believing that the air higher up above the ground is purer, orders his subjects to find an architect who can build a magnificent, and gigantic castle, and to then raise the child on the castle's rooftop where the air is purer. Senemar is found, an architect with a Byzantine background. Senemar spent many years building it (the exact number differing depending on the version of the story), and after it was completed, it reached 120 meters high. The upper pavilion was suitable for year-round habitation for Bahram.

=== Al-Tabari's account ===
One of the most well-known accounts of the background behind the construction of Khawarnaq was produced by Al-Tabari, in his History of the Prophets and Kings. According to Al-Tabari's report:

... died in the time of Yazdajird the Sinful One. The latter appointed in his stead his son al-Nuʿmān b. Imriʾ al-Qays [...], whose mother was Shaqīqah, daughter of Rabīʾah b. Dhuhl b. Shaybān, [al-Nuʿmān being] the rider of [the celebrated horse] Ḥalīmah and the builder of al-Khawarnaq. The reason for his building al-Khawarnaq, according to what has been mentioned, was that Yazdajird the Sinful One the son of Bahrām the Kirmān Shāh, son of Sābūr Dhū al-Aktāf, had [at that time] no surviving son. Hence he made enquiries concerning a spot that was healthy and free from diseases and maladies. As a result, he was directed to the elevated region of al-Ḥīrah, and he sent his [subsequently born] son Bahrām Jūr49 to this al-Nuʿmān, ordering the latter to build al-Khawarnaq as a residence for him. He made him reside there, and instructed him to send out Bahrām Jūr into the deserts of the Arabs. The actual builder of al-Khawarnaq was a man called Sinnimār. When Sinnimār had completed its construction, people were amazed at its beauty and the perfection of its workmanship. Sinnimār, however, commented, ‘If I had believed that you (al-Nuʿmān) would pay me the whole of my due and would have treated me as I deserve, I would have constructed a building which would have gone round with the sun, wherever it went in its course.’ The king then exclaimed, ‘So you could have built something more splendid than this, yet you didn’t do it?’ and he ordered him to be thrown down from the top of al-Khawarnaq.

== Wonders of the world ==
The Khawarnaq palace was considered a marvel, and one of the world's most magnificent pieces of architecture, in Islamic-Arabic tradition. Ibn Khordadbeh, in his Book of Roads and Kingdoms (al-Masālik wa’l-Mamālik), lists Khawarnaq alongside the Arch of Ctesiphon as the greatest constructions made of brick and plaster. Qutb al-Dīn Mūsā, in the Mirror of Time (Mir’āt al-Zamān), lists it as one of thirty world wonders, mentioned alongside other feats such as the Pyramids of Egypt and the Umayyad Mosque.

== See also ==
- Monastery of Hind the Elder
- Monastery of Hind the Younger

== Sources ==
- Genequand, Denis (2015). "The Archaeological Evidence for the Jafnids and the Nasrids". In Fisher, Greg (ed.). Arabs and Empires before Islam. Oxford University Press. pp. 172–213.
- Munt, Harry (2015). "Arabic and Persian Sources for Pre-Islamic Arabia". In Fisher, Greg (ed.). Arabs and Empires before Islam. Oxford University Press. pp. 437–500.
- Tehrani, Amirmahdi; Khaghani; Mansouri, Seyed (2025). "The Landscape of Khawarnaq: From Reality to Symbol, the Evolution of Narratives About the Landscape of the Sassanid Khawarnaq Palace in Islamic Period Sources". Mazar. 17: 6–19.
- Würsch, Renate (2013). "Ḵawarnaq". In Yarshater, Ehsan (ed.). Encyclopædia Iranica. Vol. XVI/2: Kassites–Kégl, Sándor. London and New York: Routledge & Kegan Paul. pp. 143–145. ISBN 978-1-934283-39-4.
