= Monastery of Hind the Younger =

Lakhmid monastery near Kufa

The Monastery of Hind the Younger (Dayr Hind al-Ṣughrā) was a monastery built in Mesopotamia, near Kufa, by the Lakhmids in late pre-Islamic times, surviving in the Islamic period. It is named after the princess Hind, daughter of the last Lakhmid king Al-Nu'man III and great-grand daughter of the older Hind. According to the Christian sources (Khuzistan Chronicle, Chronicle of Seert), Hind buried the patriarch of the Church of the East, Ishoyahb I (d. 595 AD), at the monastery, after his death. This monastery is not to be confused with the one built by Hind the Elder, the Monastery of Hind the Elder (Dayr Hind al-Kubrā).

The stories that surrounded Hind the Younger, and her monastery, captured the Islamic imagination. Narratives sprang up throughout Islamic literature including the One Thousand and One Nights, the Kitab al-Aghani of Al-Isfahani, and many other works.

The younger Hind was the wife of the famous Christian pre-Islamic poet, Adi ibn Zayd. Adi's influence in the court of Al-Nu'man III sparked jealousy, leading to his execution. This brings grief to Hind, who cloisters herself into the monastery, living there for the remainder of her days. The Book of Monasteries by Al-Shābushtī says:

Hind built this monastery in Hirah, took the veil, and lived there. At the end of her long life, she went blind. It is one of the largest and most flourishing monasteries in Hirah, standing between the Trench and Bakr's settlement.

While there are many versions of the story of Hind, the continuation always revolves what happened as she survived, into her older days, into the transition into the Islamic period. These stories always bring together "the looming subtext of al-Ḥīra’s lost glory, Christian culture, and a defiant Lakhmid princess" and the theme of material impermanence. In these stories, a Muslim ruler or conqueror asks to see Hind in her monastery, asking for her hand in marriage: sometimes this is the caliph Mu'awiya I, other times it is the companion Al-Mughira, and once it is Khalid ibn al-Walid (who does not wish to marry her himself, but to marry her to another noble Muslim). In each case, the request is rejected. According to one version of the story of the approach by Al-Mughira:

By the Cross, if I thought there was the slightest beauty or youth left in me to make you want me, I’d have answered you’, she says. ‘But you just want to be able to [go to the] pilgrimage [or the pre-Islamic festivals] (mawāsim) 45 and say that you’ve won the kingdom of al-Nu'mān ibn al-Mundhir and married his daughter! By the one you worship (bi-ḥaqq maʿbūdika), is that what you’re after?’ ‘Yes, by God’, he answers, but her reply is final: ‘Well, tough luck! (fa-lā sabīla ilayhi)’.

Al-Mughira is reputed to have written these verses later:

You realised what my soul hopes for when I’m alone / God smile on you, O Daughter of Nu'mān. / You got al-Mughīra thinking straight again; / The minds of kings are much purer than man’s / Hind, I feel you’ve told the truth, so carry on; / To be honest and truthful is to be the best that we can.

Her response to Khalid, who offers her, on condition of converting to Islam, to marry her to a Muslim nobleman:

As for religion, the only one I want is the religion of my forefathers (amā al-dīn fa-lā raghbata lī fīhi ghayra dīn ābāʾī). And as for marriage, even if there were some youth left in me, I still wouldn’t want it (wa-amā al-tazwīj fa-law kānat fiyya baqiyya la-mā raghibtu fīhi), let alone now that I’m an old woman waiting for death to turn up any day.

Khalid, seeking to convince her, asks her what she needs. She tells him that all she needs is that the Christians under his rule are kept safe. Khalid answers that he has already done so. The princess responds that, if that were the case, there is nothing from him that she needs, and rejects his proposal. Khalid offers her money and resources, but this too she rejects, pointing to her modest means of living. Khalid gives up, and leaves; Hind then recounts the story to her Christian subjects who ask her to know about what happened.

== See also ==
- Khawarnaq
