= Cenmar =

Byzantine architect of the Khawarnaq Palace

Cenmar / Sinimmār / Senemar
- سِنِمَّار
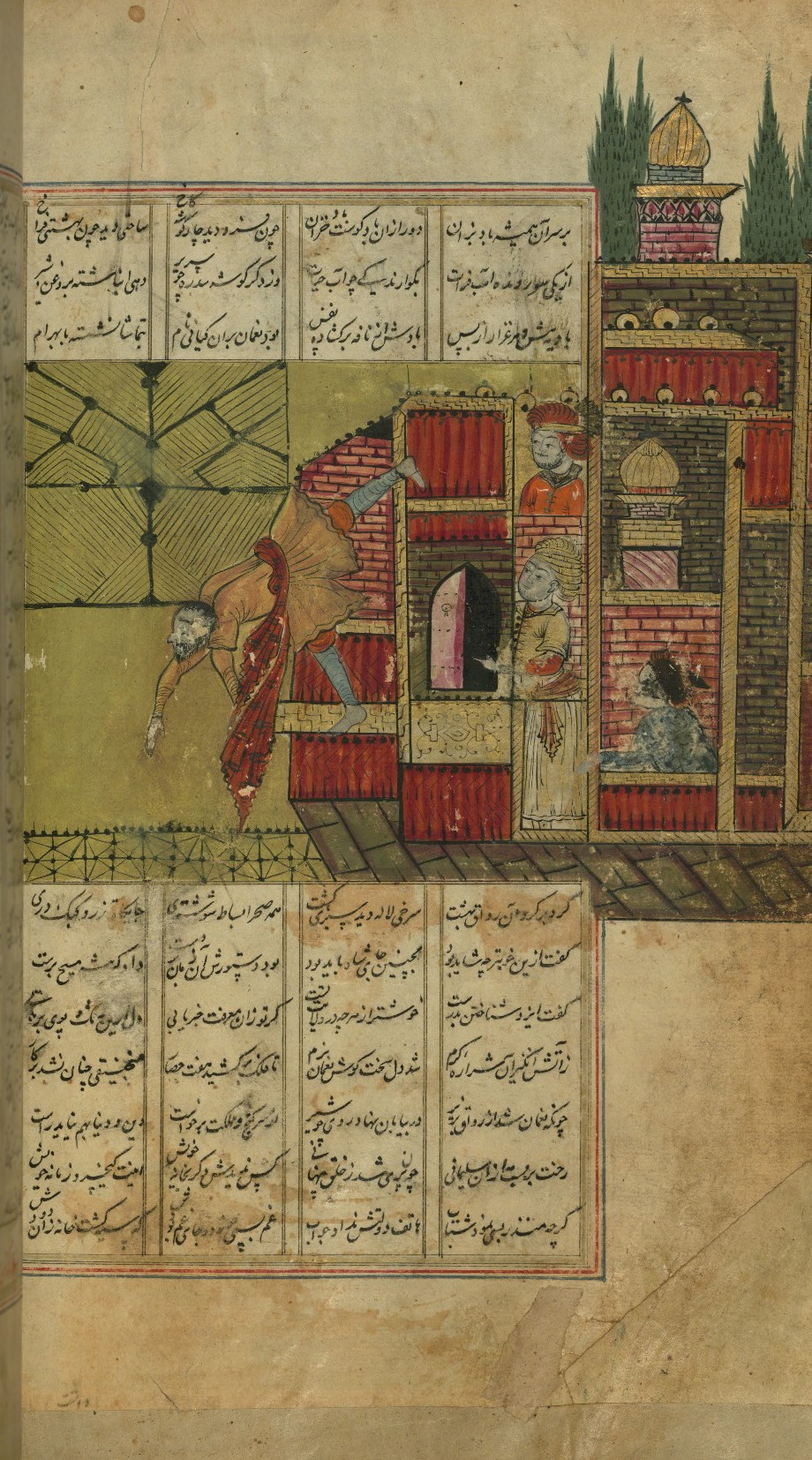
- 11th-century illustration of Nu'man throwing Senemar from the roof of the palace Khawarnaq.
- Cause of death: Execution by order of King Al-Nu'man I (thrown from palace).
- Occupations: Architect, master builder
- Era: Late antique / Early medieval
- Known for: Construction of the palace Khawarnaq for King Al-Nu'man I ibn Imru al-Qays.
- Notable work: Khawarnaq (palace)

Senemar or Sanamar (pronounced "Sinimmār" in Arabic: سِنِمَّار) was a legendary Byzantine architect who is said to have built the Khawarnaq Palace (Arabic: الخورنق) on the request of the Lakhmid king, Al-Nu'man I, in the fifth century. His story has inspired the Persian and Arabic proverb, "Senemar’s compensation" or "Senemar’s Reward" (juzʾ Sinimmār), expressing a situation where one does good work but is instead punished or given an unfair or too small reward.

The story of Senemar is an edifying moral tale found in many stories in the Arabic-Islamic literature, the most well-known sources for his life being Al-Jahiz, Al-Tabari, and Al-Isfahani. These sources all agree that Senemar constructed the castle Khawarnaq on request of the king, and that he was also executed by the king afterwards. However, they present contradictory accounts on the other details surrounding Senemar's construction of Khawarnaq and death, such as the reason why the king had Senemar executed, and about how Senemar constructed the castle. While all accounts are considered legendary, the version by Al-Jahiz is the less moralized and exaggerated, and so may be the earliest.

== Construction of Kharawnaq and execution ==
One of the most famous accounts of his life was composed by Al-Jahiz (d. 889), in his Kitāb al-Ḥayawān (The Book of Animals). The key facts about the life of Senemar, according to Al-Jahiz, are:

- Senemar was a Byzantine architect
- He built the palace of Khawarnaq on the request of the king
- The palace was magnificent
- Senemar was killed because of the vanity of the king. Jealous of the possibility that Senemar may build another palace like Khawarnaq for another king, Senemar was not only killed, but this was done by having him thrown off of the very palace he designed

A different version of events is given by Al-Tabari, in his History of the Prophets and Kings. According to Al-Tabari, the king's motive for killing Senemar arises at the end, because of an offensive remark he made to the king: Senemar tells the king that he would have built him an even bigger castle if he had known in advance that the king would have paid him the salary and respect he deserved for its construction. The king, infuriated by the suspicion and that Senemar did not build this greater castle, had him thrown off the top of Khawarnaq.

Yet another version of events is given by the Kitab al-Aghani of Al-Isfahani. According to this account, Senemar told the king that he built the palace with a weak spot. If spot is destroyed, the entire palace would collapse. To prevent the possibility that Senemar may give this information out to someone else, who may exploit the weak spot, the king has Senemar killed.

Some versions of the story continue, likely inspired by the poetry on Khawarnaq traced back to the Christian pre-Islamic Arabian poet, Adi ibn Zayd: the king, later in his life, is contemplating his death and suddenly realizes the emptiness of material wealth. He renounces worldly pleasure and goes on to live a quiet and pious life.

== Poetry ==
The most famous poetry about Khawarnaq are the ones quoted by Al-Jahiz and Al-Tabari. Al-Jahiz quotes the verses, attributed to the mouth of Senemar:

He rewarded me badly, may God reward him back / the reward of Sinimmār who had committed no sin / Except erecting a building for twenty years / topped by vaults of lead and tiles.

Al-Tabari and Al-Isfahani quote the same verse, except that in their version, Senemar spends 70 years building the palace, not 20, a likely exaggeration to enhance Senemar's accomplishment.

== Sources ==
- Alami, Mohammed Hamdouni (2011). Art and Architecture in the Islamic Tradition: Aesthetics, Politics and Desire in Early Islam. I.B. Tauris.
- Würsch, Renate (2013). "Ḵawarnaq". In Yarshater, Ehsan (ed.). Encyclopædia Iranica. Vol. XVI/2: Kassites–Kégl, Sándor. London and New York: Routledge & Kegan Paul. pp. 143–145. ISBN 978-1-934283-39-4.
