= Tourism in Jordan =

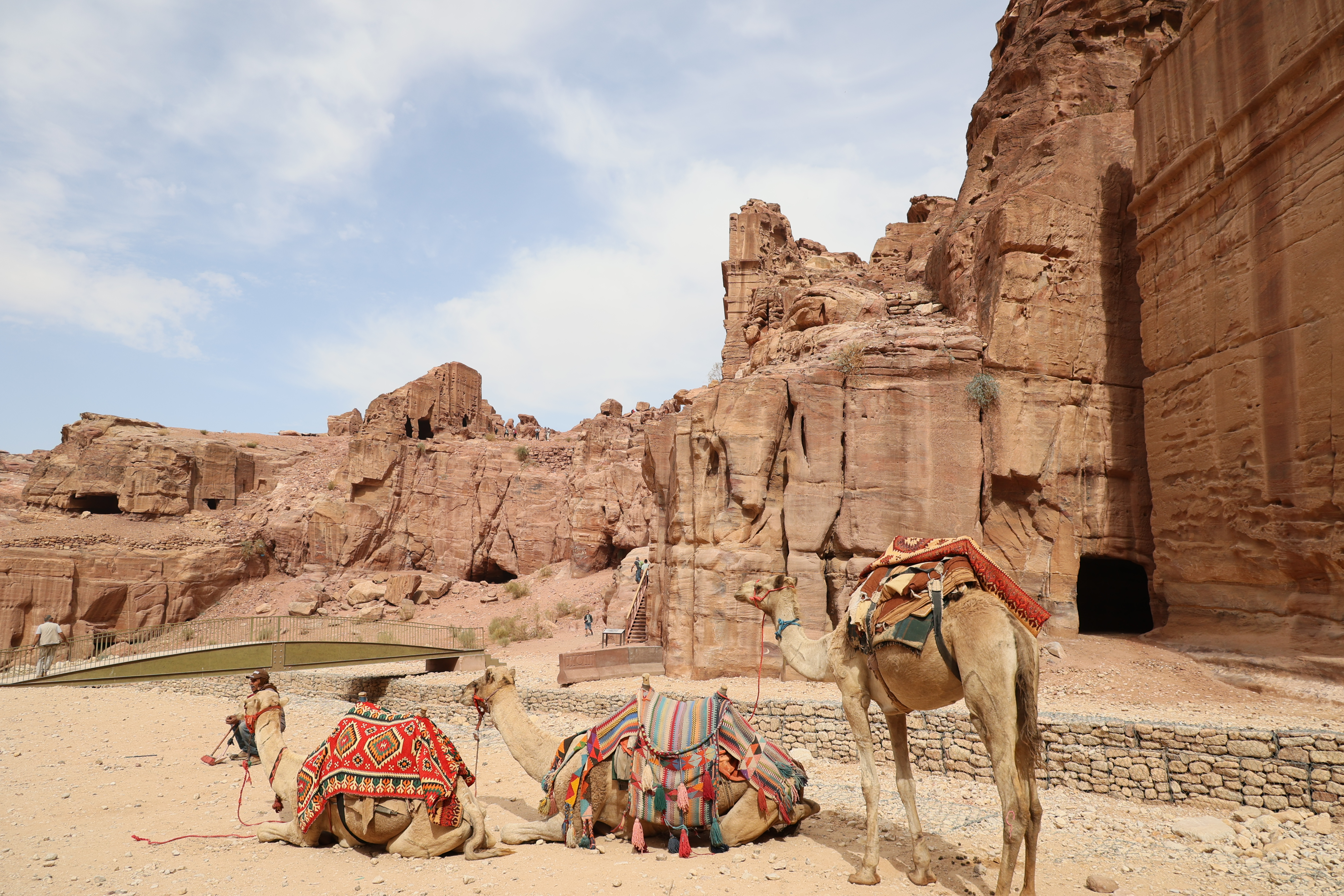
View of Petra in Jordan

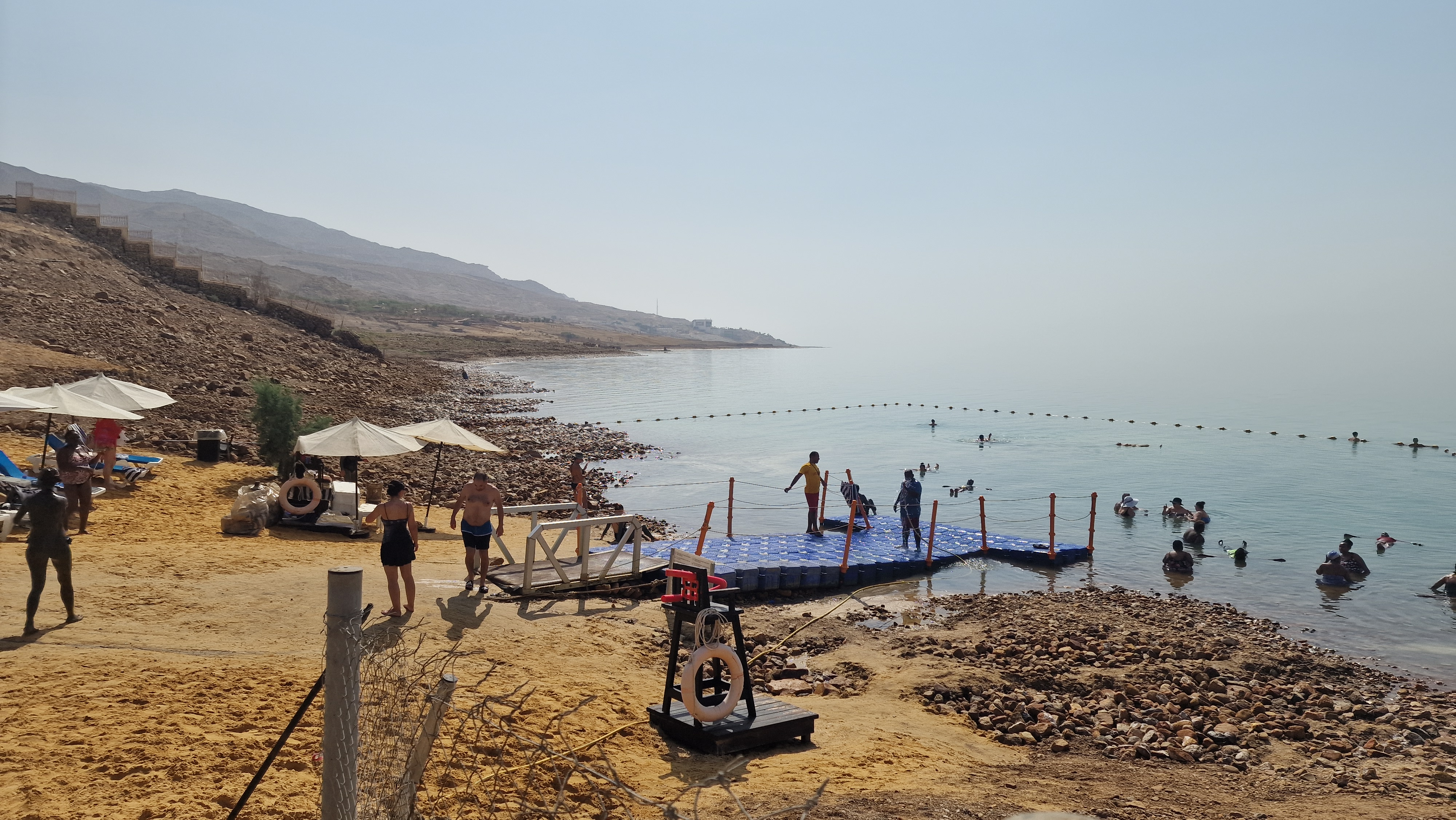
Swimming in the Dead Sea

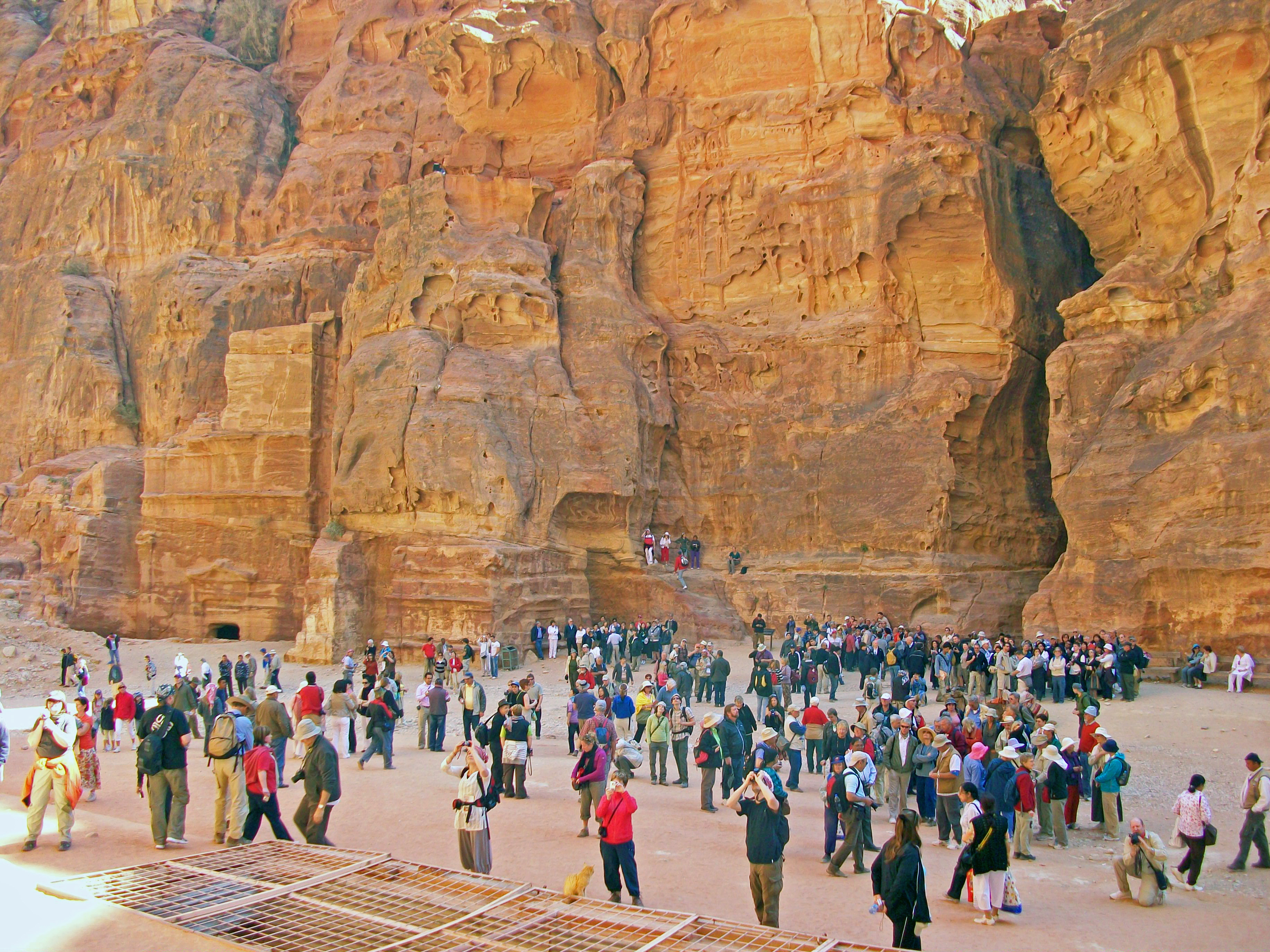
Tourists photograph Al Khazneh (not visible) upon arriving in Petra. The Siq can be seen on the right.

Jordan is a sovereign Arab state in the Middle East. The capital, Amman, is Jordan's most populous city as well as the country's economic, political and cultural centre.

Major tourist attractions in Jordan include UNESCO World Heritage Sites such as Petra and Umm ar-Rasas, ancient cities such as Amman, Aqaba, Madaba and Jerash, the Jordan River, the Dead Sea, Mount Nebo, and locations such as Wadi Rum and the Jordanian Highlands. Other opportunities include shopping, pop-culture tourism, medical tourism, educational and cultural tourism, hiking, snorkeling and scuba diving among the coral reefs in the Gulf of Aqaba.

Tourism in Jordan is a significant sector of the national economy, supported by the country’s rich historical heritage, and diverse natural landscapes. The country also has major archaeological sites such as Petra and Jerash. Other attractions are Al-Maghtastas, Mount Nebo, the Dead Sea, Wadi Rum, and the Red Sea coast at Aqaba. In addition to cultural and heritage tourism, Jordan offers medical, eco-and adventure tourism.

In 2017, Jordan recorded more than 3.8 million tourists.

== Main tourist destinations ==
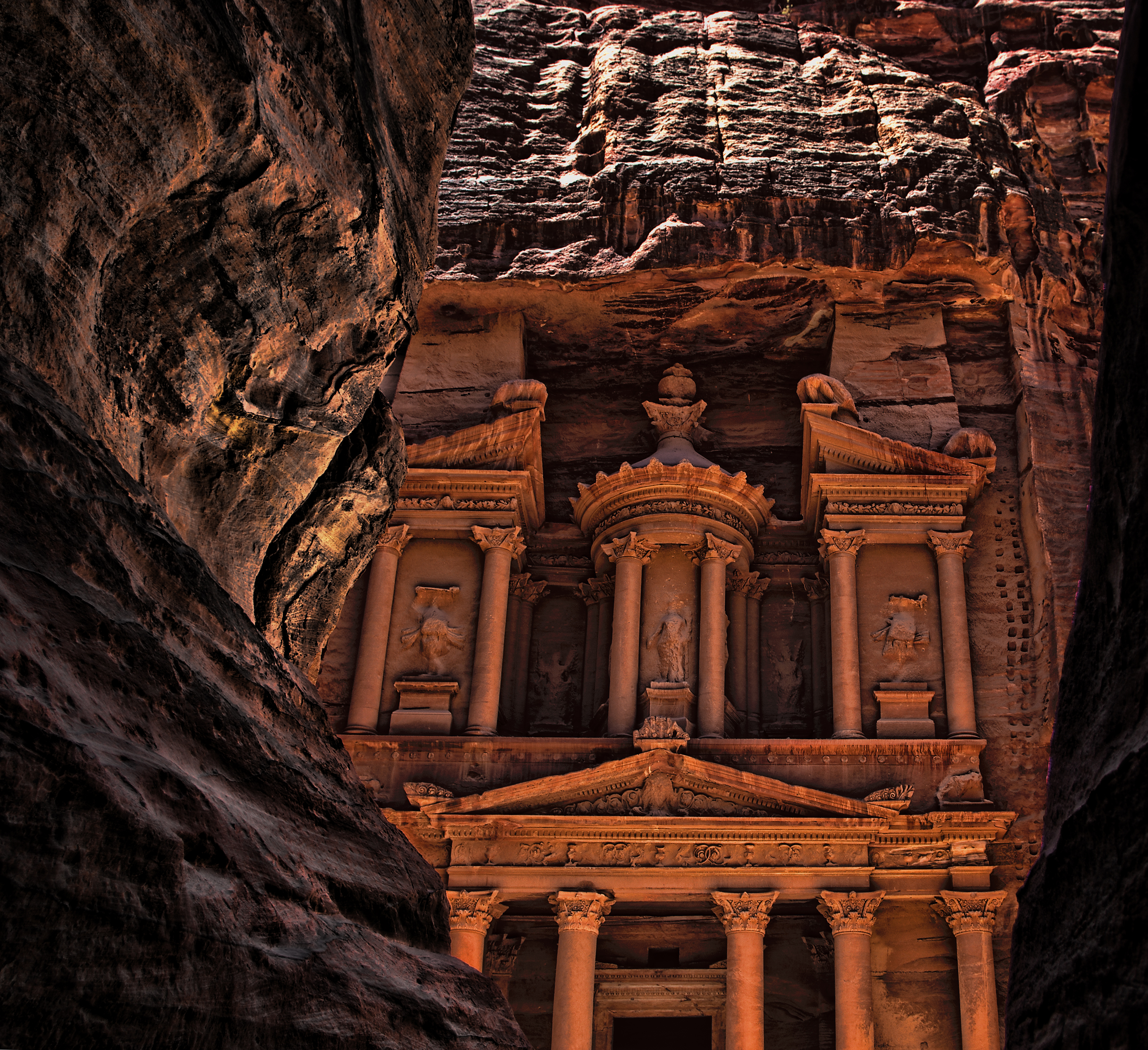
Al-Khazneh in Petra

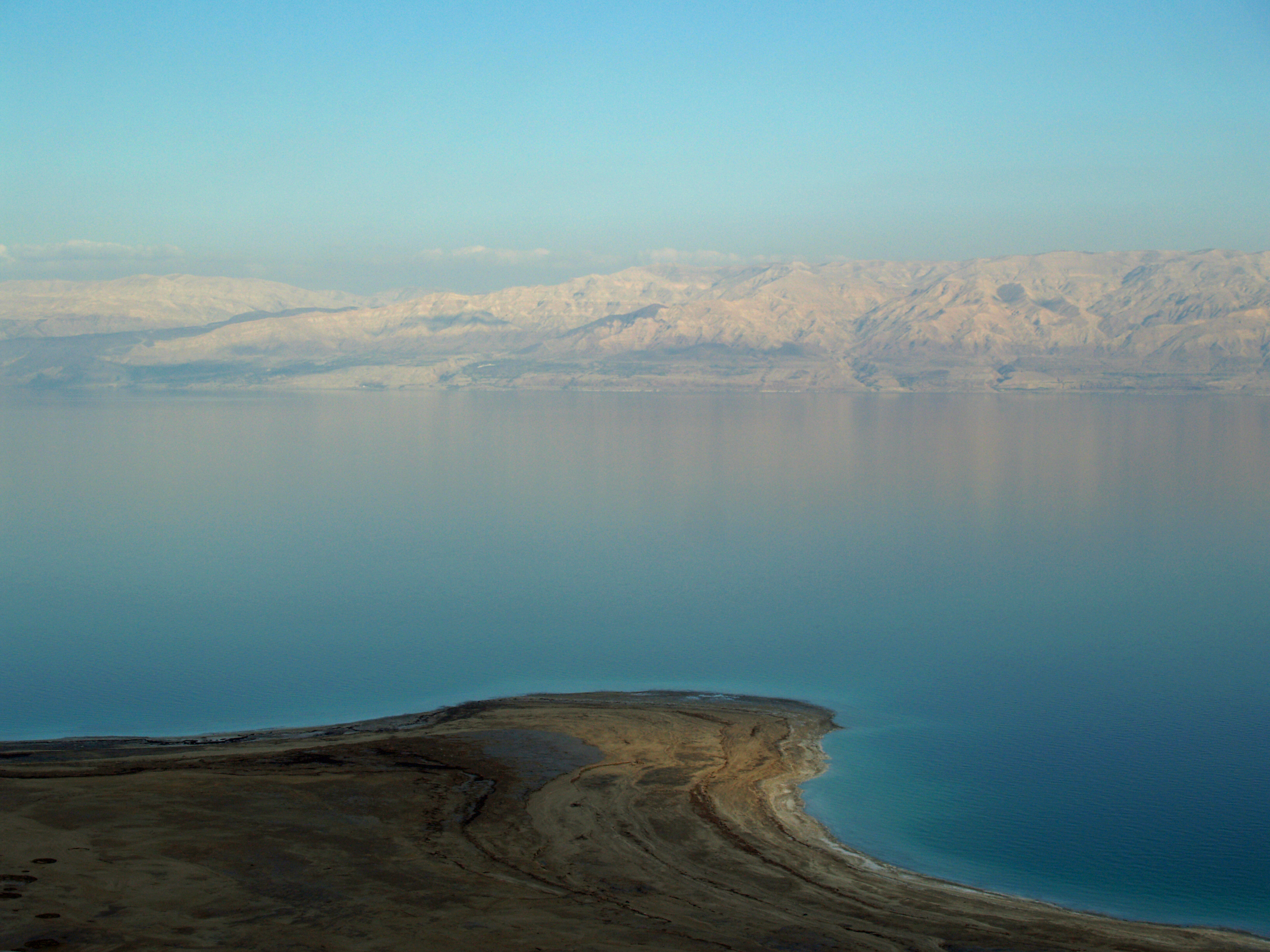
Dead Sea

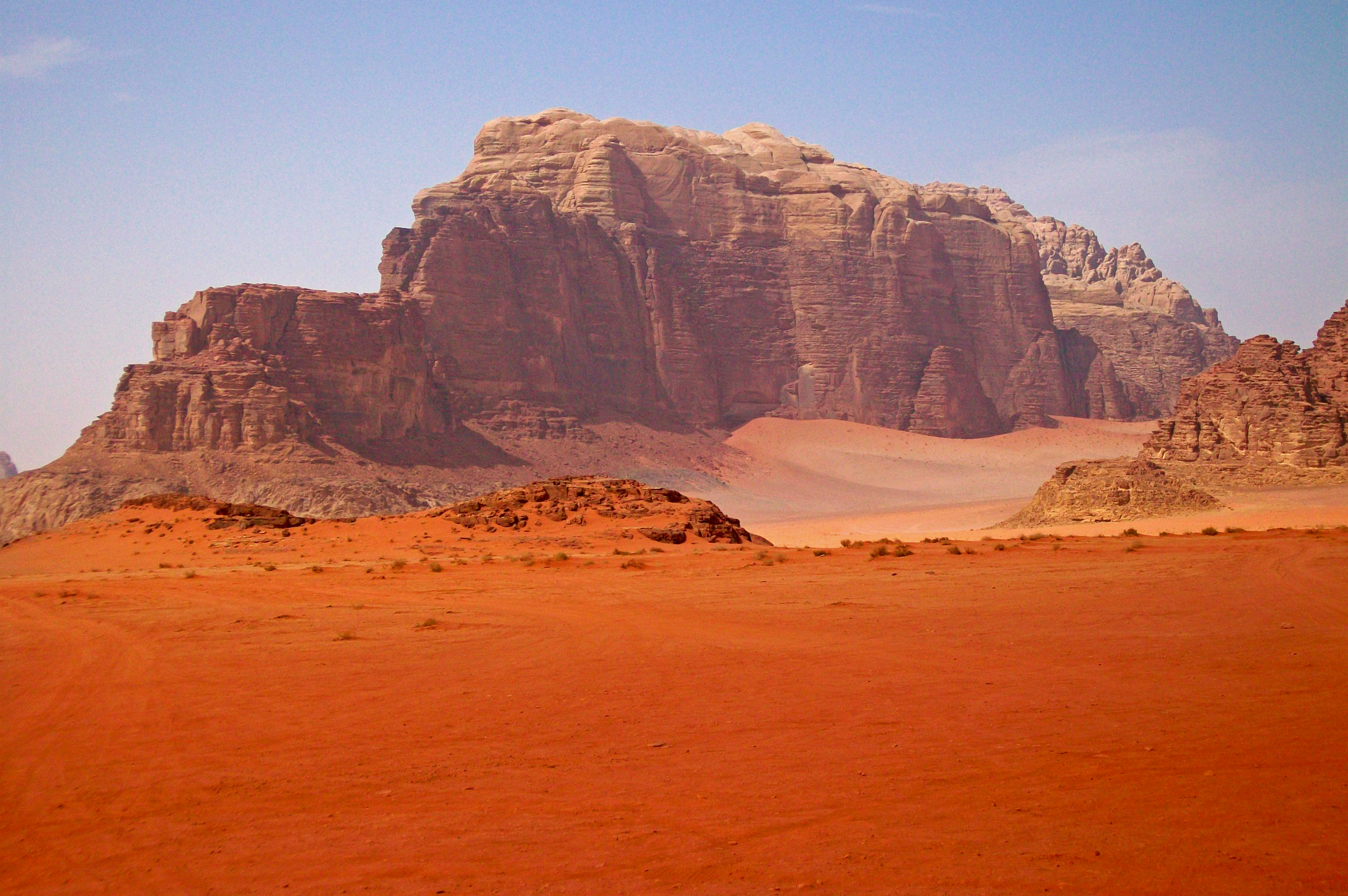
Wadi Rum

=== Ancient sites ===
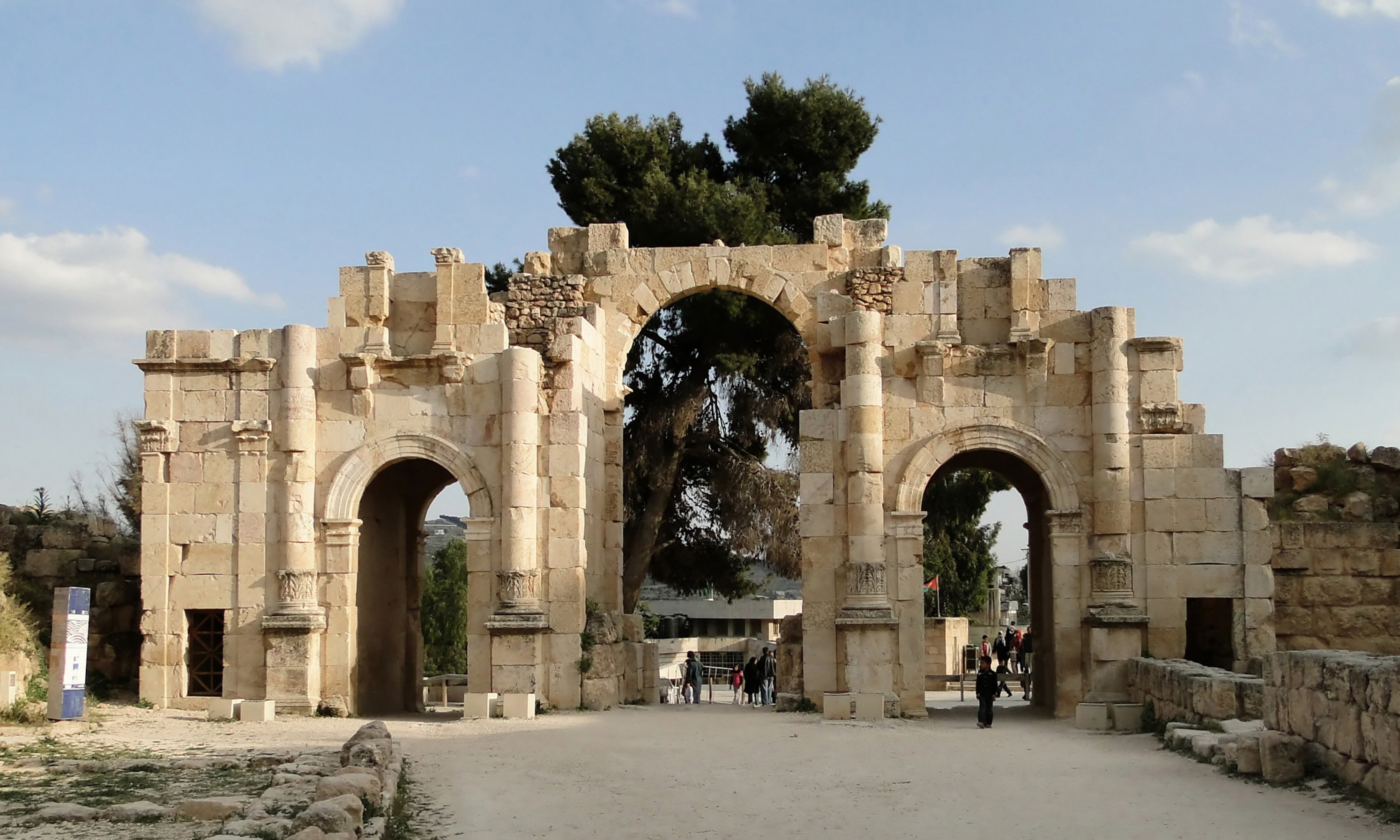
The south gate in the ancient city of Jerash

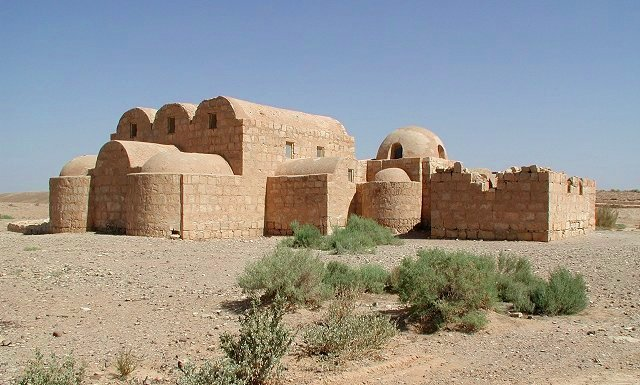
Qasr Amra a desert castle from the era of the Islamic Empire

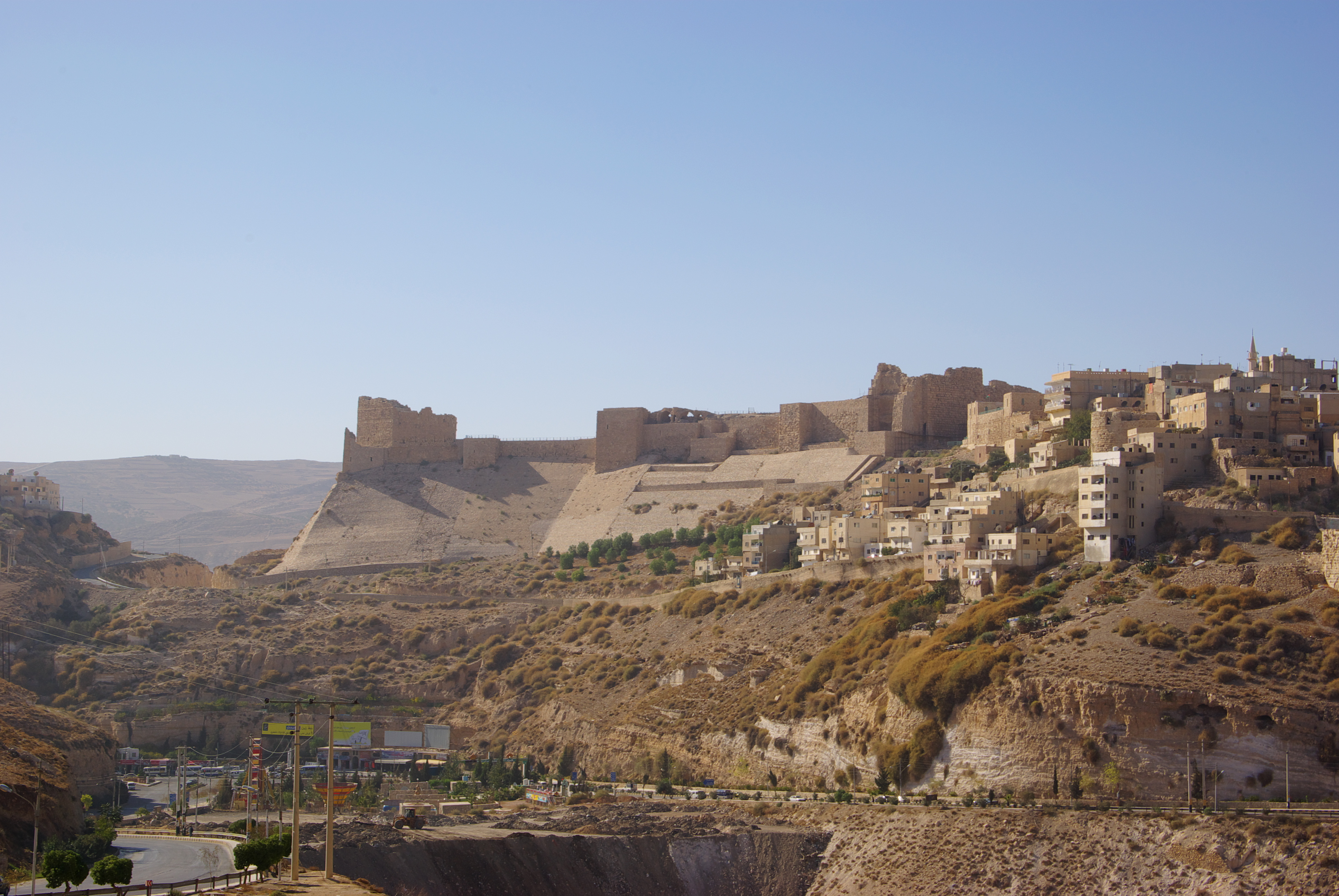
Al-Karak castle

- Petra in Wadi Musa, home of the Nabataeans, is a complete city carved in a mountain. The huge rocks are colorful, mostly pink, and the entrance to the ancient city is through a 1.25 km narrow gorge in the mountain—called the Siq. In the city are various structures, all (except 2) are carved into rock, including Al-Khazneh – known as the Treasury – which has been designated as one of the "New 7 Wonders of the World" by the for-profit New Open World Corporation. Other major sites of interest in Petra include the Monastery, the Roman theater, the Royal Tombs, the High Place of Sacrifice. The ruins of Petra were rediscovered by Swiss explorer Johann Ludwig Burckhardt in 1812. It was inscribed as a UNESCO World Heritage Site in 1985.
- Umm Qais, a town on the site of the ruined Hellenistic–Roman city
- Jerash is famous for its ancient Roman architecture, with colonnaded streets, Corinthian arches, outdoor Roman theaters and the Oval Plaza.
- Shoubak with its Crusader castle, "Crac de Montreal", marking both the eastern and southern frontier of Crusader expansion.
- Ajloun has a medieval Crusader castle
- Al-Karak contains an important castle from the times of Salah al-Din, known as Al-Karak Castle.
- Umm el-Jimal, the so-called "Black Gem of the Desert", was once a town on the margins of the Decapolis. Rural and well to do, it was a fitting contrast to the surrounding busy cities. Its black basalt mansions and towers, some still standing three stories high, have long inspired poets.
- Qusayr 'Amra, one of the best preserved Umayyad Islamic period monuments. Its interior walls and ceilings are covered with unique frescoes, and two of the rooms are paved with colourful mosaics. It, too, is a World Heritage Site.
- Umm ar-Rasas, inscribed as a UNESCO World Heritage Site in 2005, these ruins show a mix of Roman, Byzantine and early Muslim architecture. Among its treasures is the largest church mosaic floor in the country; newer discoveries are possible as the site has not been completely excavated.

=== Religious tourist sites ===
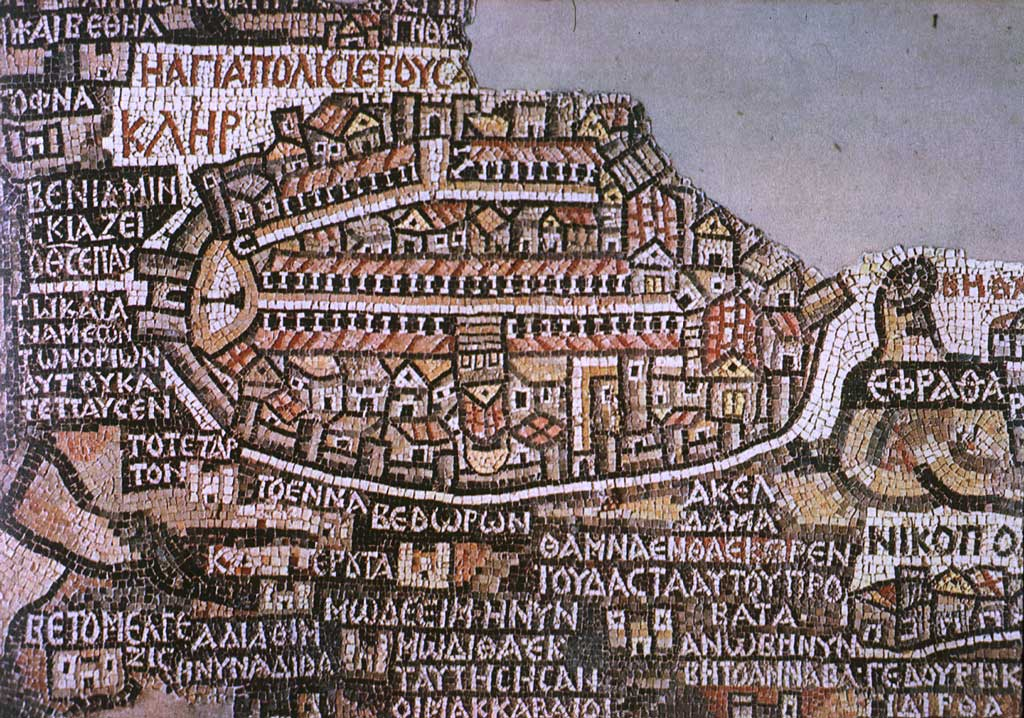
Jerusalem on the Madaba Map

- Muwakir (Arabic for Machaerus) was the hilltop stronghold of Herod the Great. Upon Herod's death, his son Herod Antipas inhabited the fortress, and ordered John the Baptist to be beheaded there and where the fabled Salomé daughter of Herodias is said to have danced the famous Dance of the Seven Veils thus asking for John the Baptists' head.
- Al-Maghtas, which is the place on the Jordan River where Jesus was baptised by John the Baptist according to Christian tradition.
- Madaba is well known for its mosaics, as well as important religious sites such as The Madaba Map, the oldest surviving original cartographic depiction of the Holy Land and especially Jerusalem. It dates to the 6th century AD.
- Mount Nebo, where Moses was said to have gone to get a view of the Promised Land before he died, according to the Bible.

=== Seaside sites ===
- Aqaba is a town on the shore of the Gulf of Aqaba with numerous shopping centers, hotels and access to various water sports and protected coral reefs and marine life. It has the ruins of the mediaeval town of Ayla and other Edomite ruins. Aqaba also has a vibrant nightlife scene especially on holiday weekends when thousands of wealthy Jordanians visit the coastal city. Numerous raves and concerts are held by international DJ's and artists at the major resorts and beach clubs. Aqaba is seeing nearly $20 billion worth of developments centered on tourism and real estate projects transforming the city into a "new Dubai".
- The Dead Sea – It is the lowest point on earth, 402 metres (1,319 ft) below sea level, and becomes 1 meter lower each year. It is the only depository of River Jordan and was part of the biblical kingdoms of Midianites and later the Moabites. The Dead Sea area is home to numerous world-class resorts such as the Kempinski, Mövenpick and Marriott. In addition, there are water parks, a public beach and international restaurants.

=== Sightseeing ===
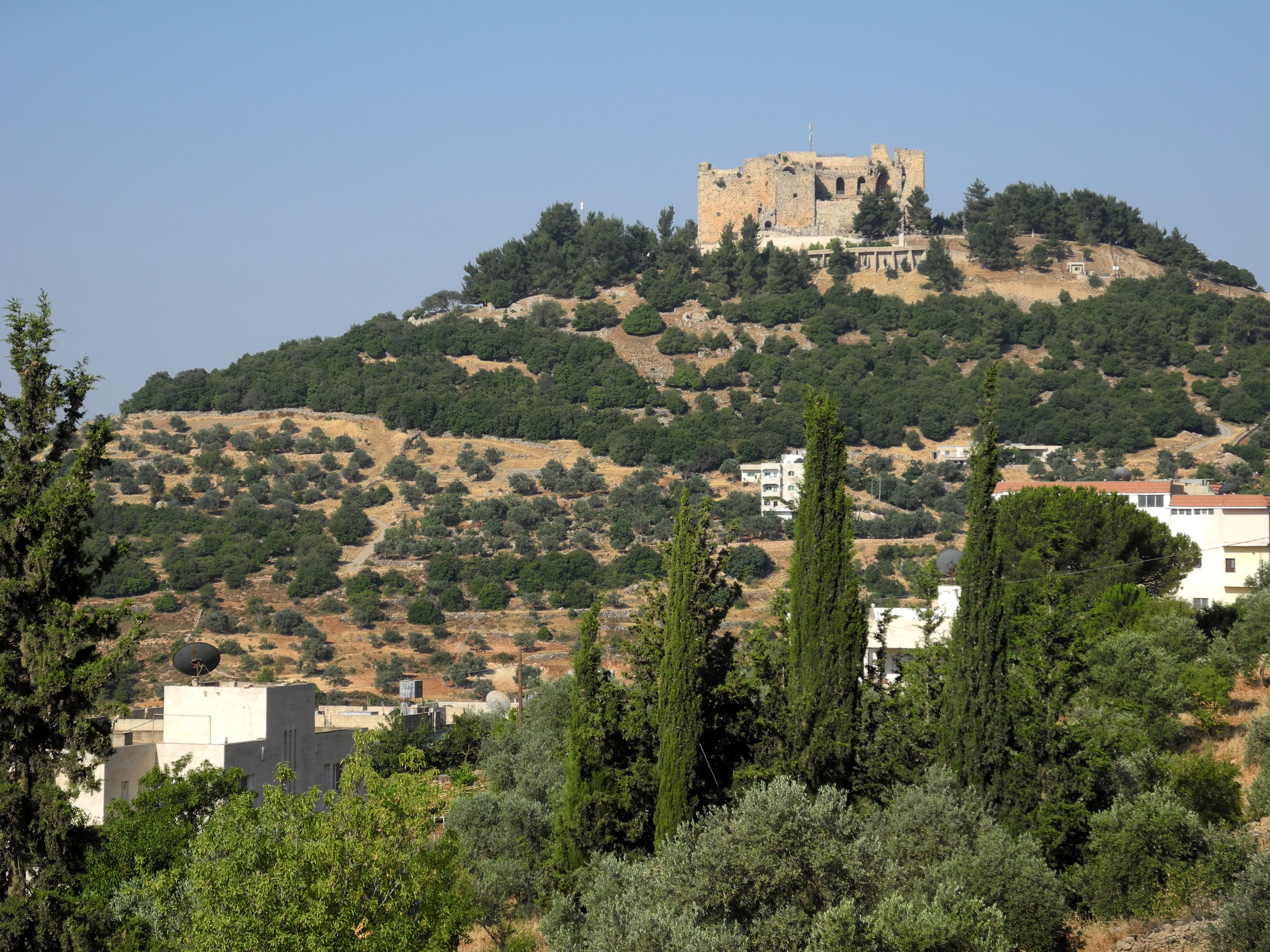
Ajloun Castle

- Amman is a modern and cosmopolitan city known for its shopping centers, hotels and ruins. Amman contains numerous ancient ruins, with one dating back to 7250 BC at the ruins of 'Ain Ghazal neolithic village. Other ruins include Amman Citadel which is a hilltop in east Amman that combines many ruins left by several ancient civilizations such as; Umayyad Palace, Byzantine churches, Roman Temple of Hercules. Down that hill lies the famous large Ammani ancient Roman amphitheater along with Hashemite Plaza, Nymphaeum and the smaller Odeon amphitheater. In addition to these archaeological sites, the modern city of Amman has numerous performance spaces, parks, museums, restaurants, commercial districts, and modern cultural and historical sites of interest, such as Wasat al Balad, Al Hussein Public Parks, the Jordan National Gallery of Fine Arts, King Abdullah Mosque, and Abu Darwish Mosque.
- Mahis with its religious sites.
- Wadi Rum is a desert full of mountains and hills located south of Jordan. It is popular for its sights in addition to a variety of sports that are practiced there, such as rock-climbing. It is also known for its connection to T. E. Lawrence; some scenes in Lawrence of Arabia were filmed here. In the late 2000s it was inscribed as a World Heritage Site for its natural and cultural heritage.
- Irbid, Jordan's second largest city, is home to several museums and malls as well. However, the main reason for foreigners visiting the city is the plethora of universities that the cities host with Jordan University of Science and Technology and Yarmouk University being the two most prominent. The city hosts a large student population from all across Jordan, the Middle East and further afield. Irbid's University Street is home to the most internet cafes per mile in the world.
- Fuheis, a town about 20 minutes north-west of Amman known for its traditional 18th and 19th century churches and turn of the century provincial Jordanian architecture.
- The number of available activities and things to do in Jordan is increasing all the time, even though the COVID-19 pandemic did slow the pace of development of new attractions.

=== Museums ===
Jordan has a diverse and growing number of museums which serve Jordanian and international visitors alike. Several museums in the capital, Amman, are listed by the Ministry of Tourism and Antiquities. They include the Jordan Museum, which is a national museum focused on Jordan's archaeological and cultural heritage, the Royal Tank Museum housing over 120 tanks with a focus on Jordan's military history, and The Royal Automobile Museum and the Children's Museum Jordan, which are both located in King Hussein Park in Amman. There are several art museums and institutions including Darat al Funun, the Jordan National Gallery of Fine Arts, and the MMAG Foundation. Other smaller museums in Amman include the Jordan Archaeological Museum on the Amman Citadel, which houses many important archaeological artifacts. The Jordan Folklore Museum, also known as the Jordanian Museum of Popular Traditions, is located at the Roman Theater in Amman. The Tiraz Center in Amman focuses on private collections of Palestinian, Jordanian, and Arab costumes and textiles. The Museums of Archaeology and Heritage can be found on the campus of the University of Jordan and require a prior appointment to visit. The Museum of Parliamentary Life and the Ahli Bank Numismatic Museum can also be found in Amman.

Outside of Amman, there are a number of museums focusing on art, archaeology, ethnography and natural history. Overlooking the Baqa'a Valley just north of Amman is the Art Gallery (opened 2017) with its extensive modern art collection from across the Arab world. In the historic city of as-Salt, there is the Abu Jaber Museum, which focuses on late Ottoman and early 20th century history and traditions, as well as an historic house containing the as-Salt Archaeological Museum. There are numerous agritourism developments in the verdant north of Jordan near Salt, such as the ones in and around the archaeologically rich village of Gilead, namely the Mountain Breeze Resort and those affiliated with BookAgri, which aims to encourage the local farmers to showcase their traditional way of life to visitors. In Madaba, south of Amman, there is the Madaba Archaeological Museum, an Interpretive Center at St. George's Church, home of the Madaba Map, as well as a small museum at nearby Mount Nebo. The Dead Sea Panorama Complex contains an informative museum focusing on the natural history and geology of the Dead Sea. Nearby in Ghor es-Safi is the Lowest Point on Earth Museum, which displays important archaeological discoveries from this region of the South Jordan Valley. The Petra Museum (opened 2019), is located at the entrance of the World Heritage Site of Petra and presents around 300 objects from the Petra region, ranging from prehistory to the present day.

There are several smaller regional or site museums focused on archaeology found across Jordan including the Dar as-Saraya Museum, Irbid, the Museum of Jordanian Heritage at Yarmouk University, also in Irbid, the Karak Archaeological Museum, Karak, the Jerash Archaeological Museum and Jerash Visitor Center, as well as museums at Umm Qais, Aqaba, and Qasr al-Hallabat.

=== Nightlife ===
Jordan, most specifically Amman and to a lesser extent Aqaba, has emerged as one of the region's hotspots for nightlife. Alongside Ramallah, Haifa, Dubai, Beirut, Sharm el Sheikh, and Manama, Amman is a premier clubbing destination in the Arab World and the Middle East. The country has seen an explosion in nightlife options ranging from high end nightclubs and bars in the capital city to world-class raves at the Dead Sea and Wadi Rum. Aqaba too has seen a proliferation in nightclubs and beach clubs as a result of the massive of foreign investment and influx of foreign labor and tourists due to the establishment of the special economic zone, ASEZA. Distant Heat held annually in Wadi Rum is considered one of the world's top raves.

=== Natural reserves ===
Jordan has a number of natural reserves.

- Azraq Wetland Reserve – Azraq is a unique wetland oasis located in the heart of the semi-arid Jordanian eastern desert, managed by the Royal Society for the Conservation of Nature (RSCN). Its attractions include several natural and ancient built pools, a seasonally flooded marshland, and a large mudflat known as Qa'a Al-Azraq. A wide variety of birds stop at the reserve each year for a rest during their arduous migration routes between Asia and Africa. Some stay for the winter or breed within the protected areas of the wetland.
- Dana Biosphere Reserve – covers 308 square kilometres, composed of a chain of valleys and mountains which extend from the top of the Jordan Rift Valley down to the desert lowlands of Wadi Araba. Dana is home to about 600 species of plants, 37 species of mammals and 190 species of birds.
- Mujib Nature Reserve – the lowest nature reserve in the world, with a spectacular array of scenery near the east coast of the Dead Sea. The reserve is located within the deep Wadi Mujib gorge, which enters the Dead Sea at 410 metres below sea level. The Reserve extends to the Kerak and Madaba mountains to the north and south, reaching 899 metres above sea level in some places. Wadi Mujib enjoys a magnificent bio-diversity that is still being explored and documented today. Over 300 species of plants, 10 species of carnivores and numerous species of permanent and migratory birds have been recorded.
- Shaumari Wildlife Reserve – The Shaumari Reserve was created in 1975 by the RSCN as a breeding centre for endangered or locally extinct wildlife. Today, following breeding programmes with some of the world's leading wildlife parks and zoos, this small, 22-square-kilometre reserve is a thriving protected environment for some of the most rare species in the Middle East, as Arabian oryx, ostriches, gazelles and onagers, which are depicted on many 6th century Byzantine mosaics.
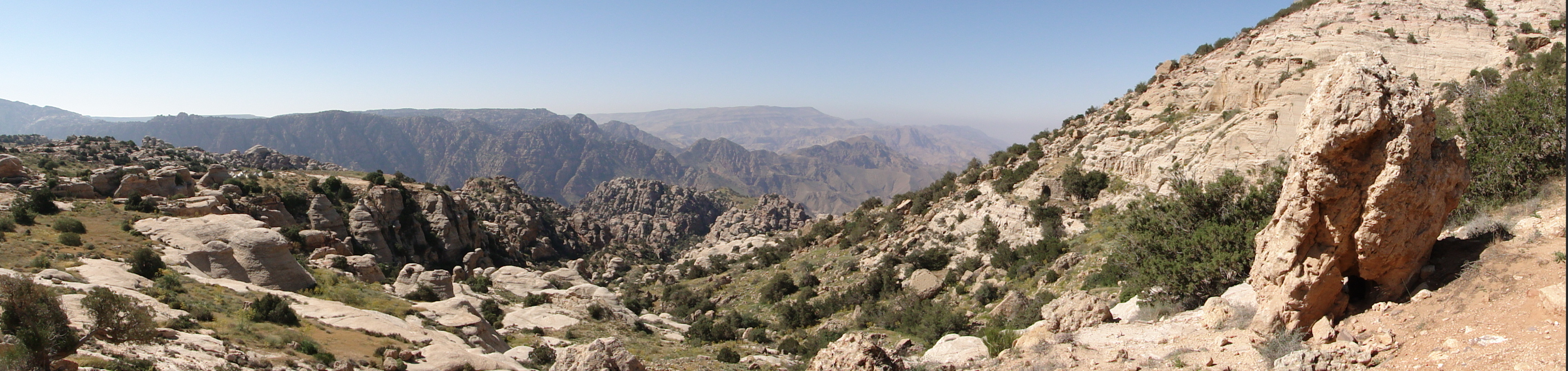
Dana Biosphere Reserve in south-central Jordan

== Visitor statistics ==
Most visitors arriving to Jordan were from the following countries of nationality:

Country	2016	2015	2014
Saudi Arabia	▼756,989	▼883,884	1,057,604
Palestine	▲693,454	▲611,601	542,059
Egypt	▼244,418	▲258,366	249,561
United States	▲166,441	▲161,013	160,766
Iraq	▼142,044	▼158,364	224,596
Israel	▼141,881	▼154,316	176,032
Syria	▼136,973	▼193,966	421,166
Kuwait	▼89,994	▲92,343	91,069
United Kingdom	▲64,766	▼60,820	73,702
India	▲57,720	▼49,755	54,129
Germany	▲57,497	▼47,951	56,323
Yemen	▼57,333	▲71,895	67,071
Total	▼4,778,529	▼4,809,274	5,326,501

== Investment ==
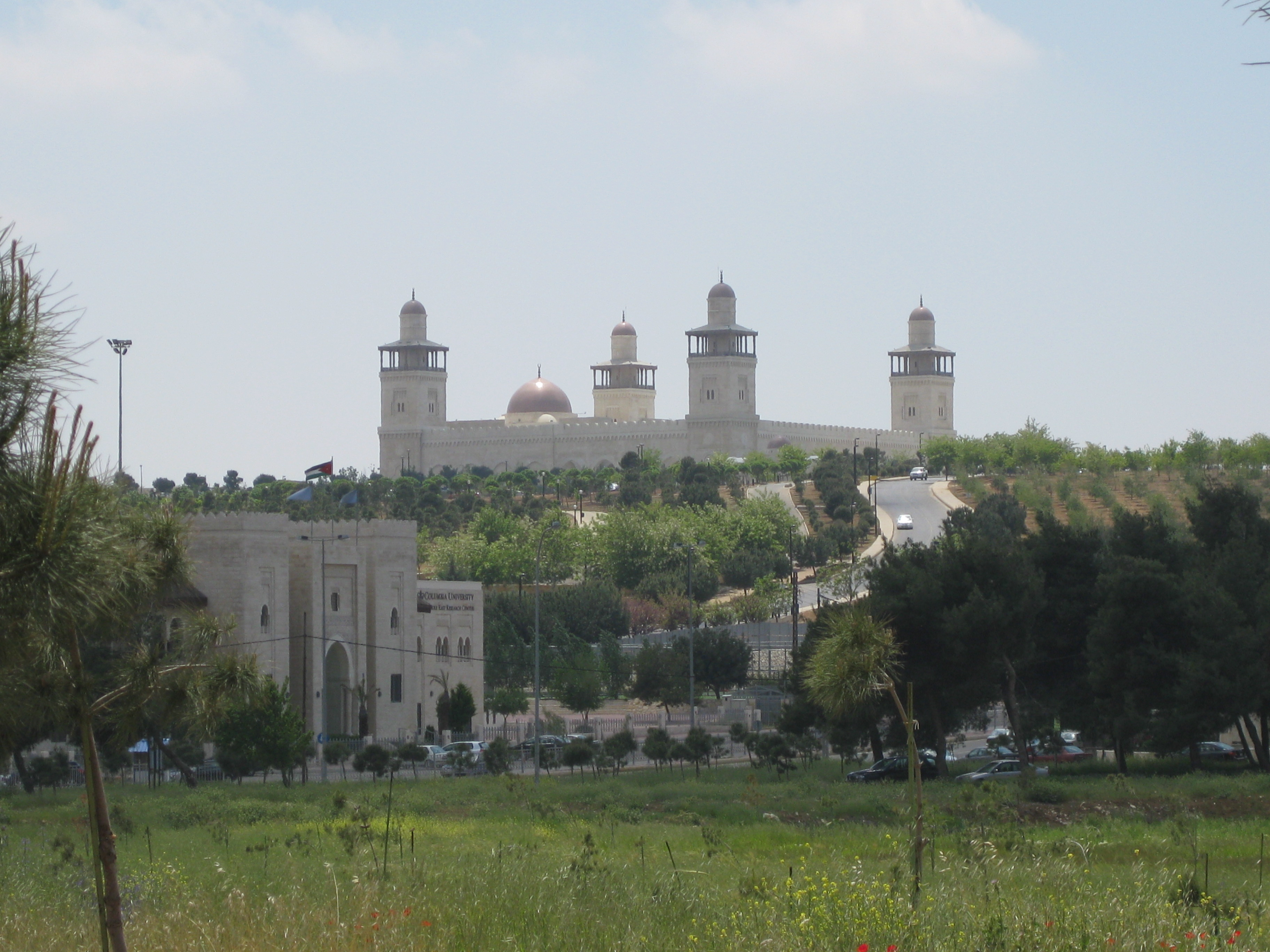
King Hussein Mosque in Amman

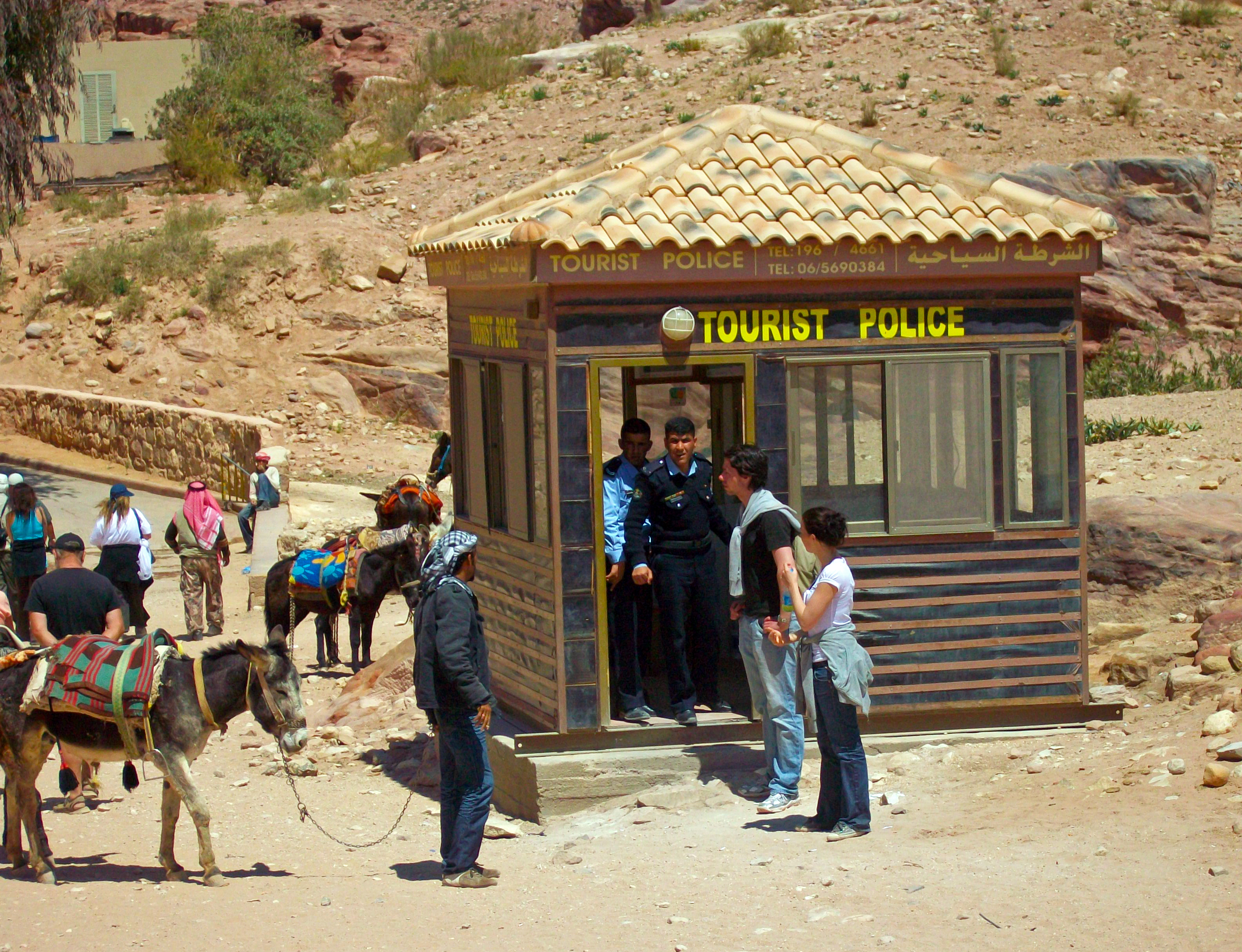
Tourist police kiosk at Petra

Jordan is investing heavily in its tourist infrastructure in the form of luxury hotels, spas, resorts, and massive real estate projects, as The "Abdali Urban Regeneration" Project and the "Marsa Zayed" in Aqaba. Luxury residential housing like Sanaya Amman and the Living Wall are attracting affluent Persian Gulf vacationers to buy property in Jordan.

Queen Alia International Airport is being expanded to handle 9 million passengers annually in the first phase; 12 million in the second phase.

Tourism Development Currently USAID is an active partner in the development of the tourism industry in Jordan with the continued support of the Jordan Tourism Development Project (Siyaha), currently in its second project lifecycle.

- Jordan Tourism Project (SIYAHA)

Duration: 2005–2008
Funding: $17,424,283 (estimated)
Implementing Partner: Chemonics International

- Jordan Tourism Project II (SIYAHA)

Duration: 2008–2013
Funding: $28 million
Implementing Partner: Chemonics International

With the establishment of the Aqaba Special Economic Zone, nearly twenty billion dollars have been invested in Jordan's sole coastal city. Luxurious resorts such as Saraya Aqaba and Tala Bay are being constructed with more in the pipeline like the $1 billion Ayla Oasis. With Jordan becoming increasing popular as a cruising destination, a new and modern cruise ship terminal is being constructed in the Marsa Zayed project.

in June 2025 Jordan and Russia signed a visa-free travel deal, letting their citizens visit each other for up to 30 days per trip, and 90 days per year, without needing a visa. This removes travel fees and paperwork. The goal is to boost tourism, strengthen ties, and support businesses like airlines and hotels in both countries.

== See also ==
- World Tourism Organization
- Visa policy of Jordan
