= Biete Meskel =

Coordinates: 12.033941°N 39.0434°E

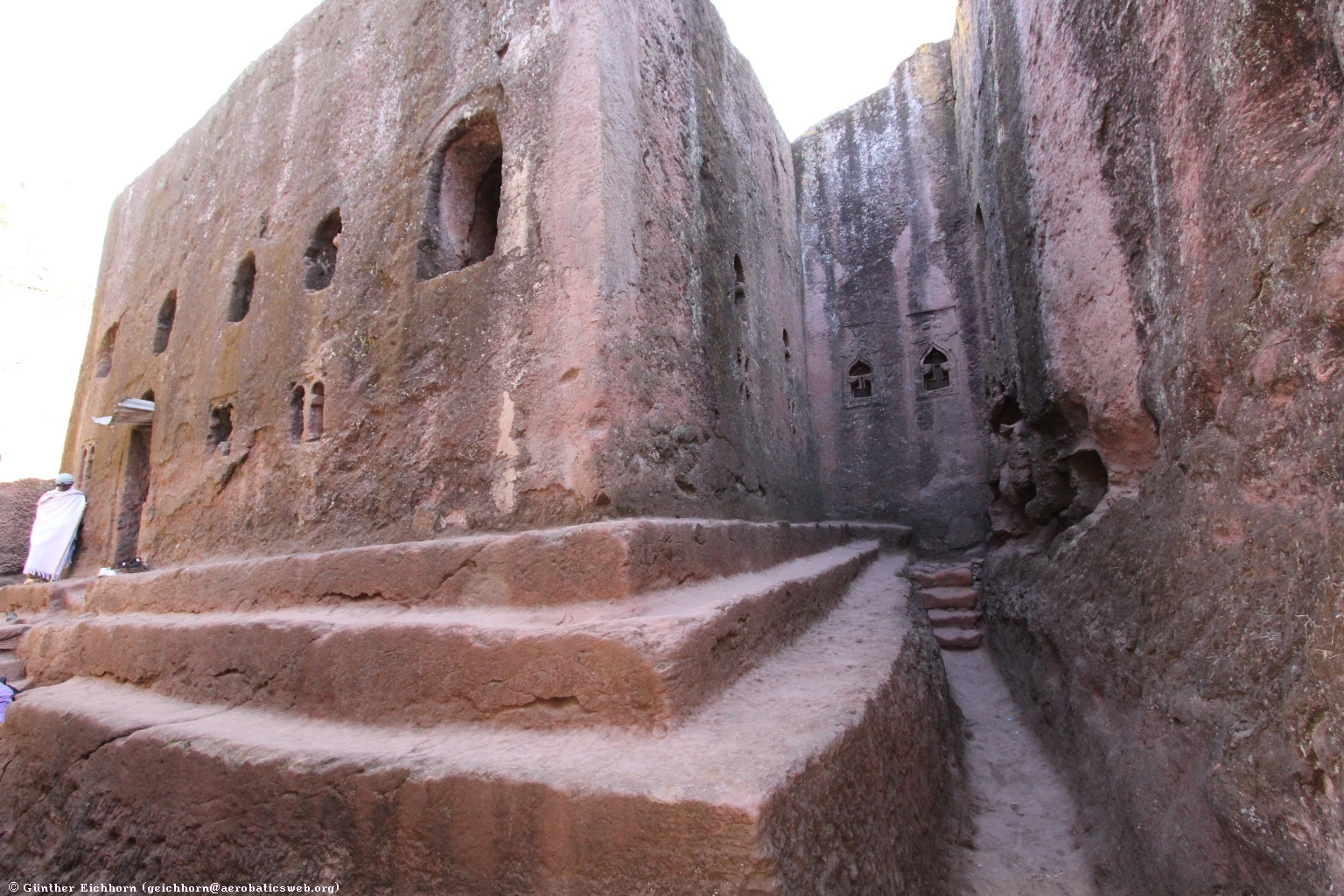
The rock church Biete Meskel in Lalibela, Ethiopia

Biete Meskel (House of the Cross) is an Orthodox underground monolith church carved into rock. It is located in Lalibela, Ethiopia.. It is part of UNESCO World Heritage Site at Lalibela.

== 3D Documentation ==
The Zamani Project, based at the University of Cape Town, spatially documented the rock-hewn churches of Lalibela, including Biete Meskel, during four field campaigns between 2005-2009. The documentation was carried with the support of the Andrew W Mellon Foundation and in co-operation with the World Monuments Funds. Over 1200 terrestrial laser scans where acquired to generate 3D models of 14 monuments. Panorama tours combining photographic full-dome panoramas and covering all churches were also generated. Textured 3D models, panorama tours, elevations, sections and plans are available on www.zamaniproject.org.
