= Ed-Deir, Petra =

Building carved out of rock in Petra, Jordan

ed-Deir ("The Monastery")
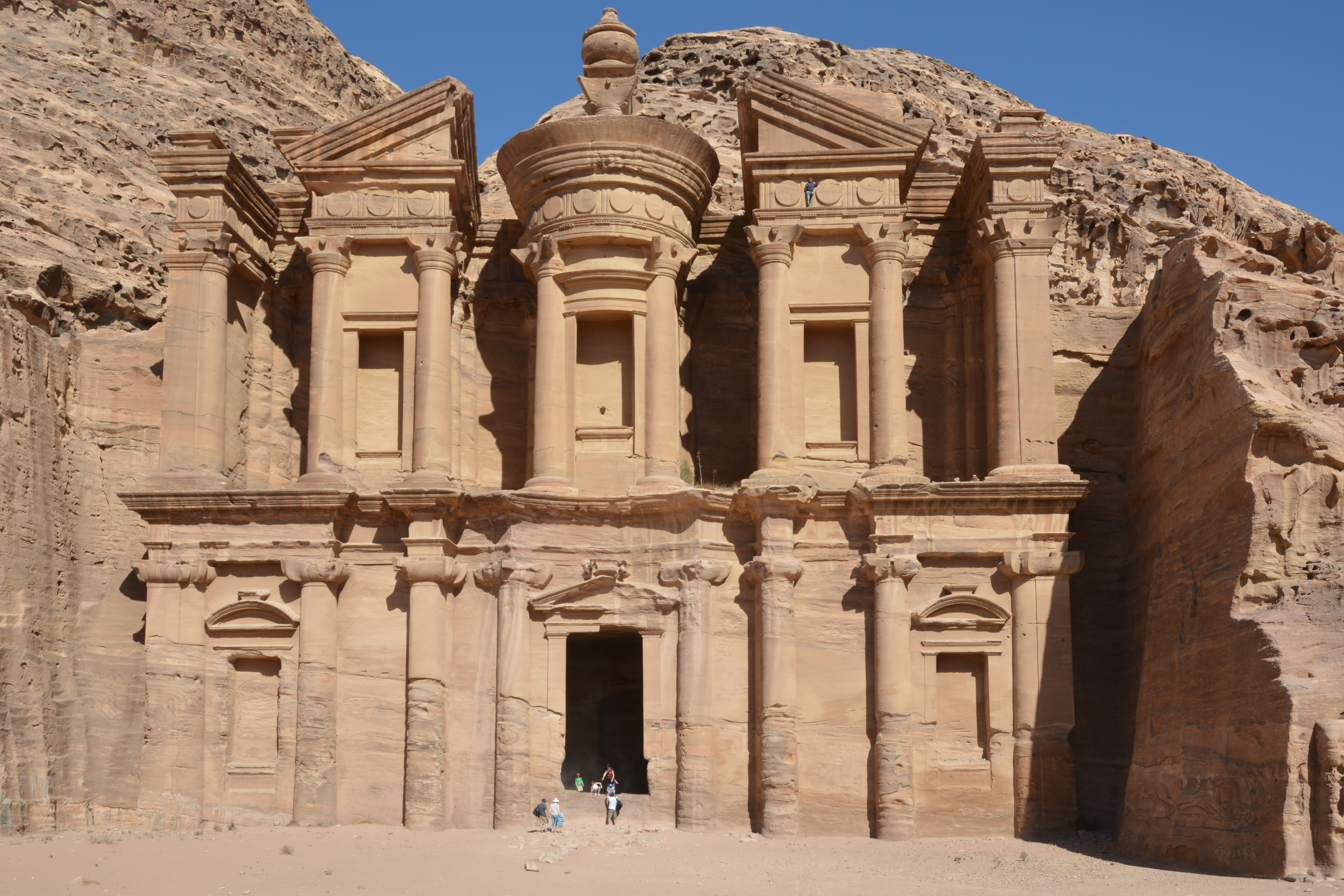
- ed-Deir
- Interactive map of ed-Deir ("The Monastery")
- Location: Petra, Jordan
- Coordinates: 30°20′16″N 35°25′52″E
- Type: Nabataean cultic structure; Byzantine period Christian church (?)
- Width: 48 m (157 ft)
- Height: 47 m (154 ft)
- Completion date: mid-1st century AD
- Dedicated to: Obodas I (?)

Ed-Deir (Arabic: الدير, lit. 'The Monastery'), also spelled el-Deir and ad-Deir/ad-Dayr, is a monumental building carved out of rock in the ancient city of Petra in southern Jordan. The Deir was probably carved in the mid-first century AD.

Arguably one of the most iconic ancient Arab monuments in the Petra Archaeological Park, the monastery is located high in the hills northwest of the Petra city center. It is the second most commonly visited monument in Petra, after the Khazneh or "Treasury".

The huge façade, the inner chamber and the other structures next to it or in the wider area around the Deir probably originally served a complex religious purpose, and was possibly repurposed as a church in the Byzantine period.

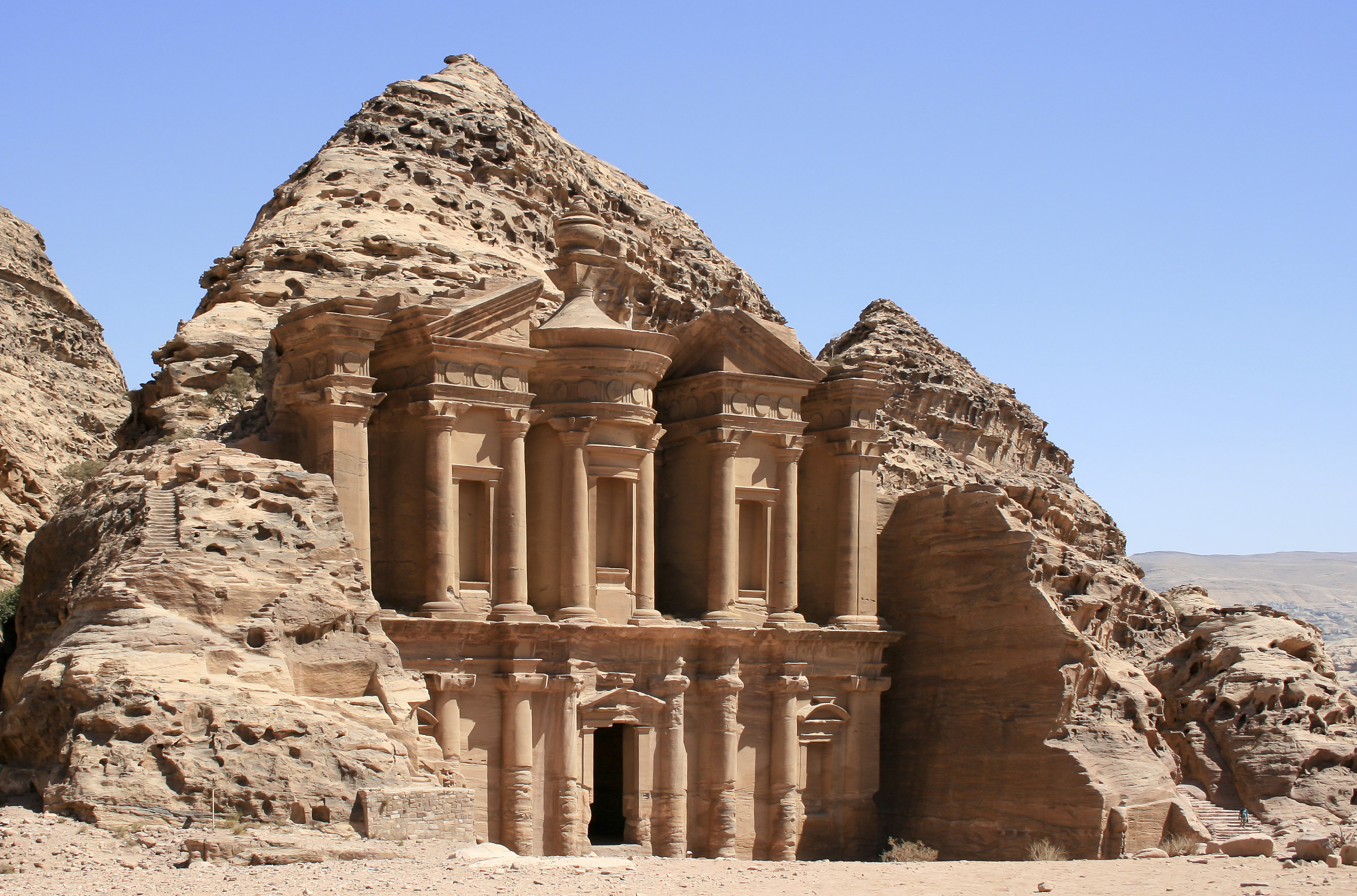
The whole building carved out of rock

Ed-Deir, 2018

== Location ==
The path to Ed-Deir, with the façade in the distance

The monastery can be reached by ascending a nearly 800-step path (40-minute walking time) from the Basin. The Wadi Kharrubeh, the Lion's tomb, and small biclinia and grottos can be seen en route to the monastery. From the monastery, one can view the valleys of Wadi Araba and the gorges along with the semi-arid territory immediately around Petra.

== Exterior design ==
Scholars believe that the flat area in front of the monastery was levelled through human action in order to make the area suitable for social gatherings or religious occasions. Near the entrance of the structure are the remains of a wall and a colonnade.

The rock-cut façade of the monastery, 47 m (154 ft) high and 48 m (157 ft) wide, has a broken pediment, the two sides of which flank a central tholos-shaped element. This element has a conical roof that is topped by an urn.

== Interior plan ==
The interior layout of the monastery consists of a single square chamber with a broad niche in the back wall. Each end of this niche contains four steps, and the niche itself is framed by pillars and a segmental arch. The room is thought to have been painted and plastered, even though none of these decorations have survived into the modern day.

== Architectural style ==
The monastery is an example of Nabataean architecture. Its blending of architectural styles is a hallmark of the dynamic and hybridised nature of Petra as a whole.

Architecturally, the monastery follows classical Nabataean style, which is represented by a mixture of Hellenistic and Mesopotamian styles of construction. The Hellenistic influence can be seen in the columns of the monastery, which are constructed in an abstracted Corinthian style. These columns are thought to have been included for aesthetic purposes, as the entire structure is carved directly into the sandstone cliff and does not require the support that columns would traditionally provide in freestanding Hellenistic structures. The façade as a whole boasts a Doric entablature (superstructure containing moldings and bands lying above the capitals), but does not have figures in the metope, only simple roundels.

Mesopotamian style is evident in the single, large entrance and the plain, window-like depressions of the facade. The door to the main chamber of the monastery is 8 metres high and provides the sole portal for the entry of light into the structure. The presence of square-topped tower structures on either side of the monastery also demonstrate the Mesopotamian influence present in the structure.

== Purpose ==
=== Nabataean ===
The role of the Deir, which was likely built in the mid-1st century CE, cannot be assessed with certainty, with hopes that further excavations could offer an answer. The suggestion that it served as a Nabataean royal tomb, based on external similarities with the Khazneh and the Tomb of the Roman Soldier is contradicted by the layout of the inner chamber and the apparently related structures in front of the Deir. The interior design does not contain any obvious burial, like in many tombs of Petra. However, the rock-cut chamber has a large central recess, a cella or adyton (innermost sanctuary), accessed by two short staircases, similar to those leading up to the cult podium of the Temple of the Winged Lions, which would be unusual for a tomb, as well as two low benches along the side walls, which suggest that the chamber was built to serve as a biclinium. Outside there are remains of a colonnade, a possible altar, and a round enclosure, possibly offering the frame for ritual performances which could be observed from a platform up on the plateau opposite the facade. The Deir can be interpreted as a private palatial complex with mixed residential, funerary and religious function, similar to the Tomb of the Roman Soldier complex. It could also have been, maybe together with the structures on the hill opposite the Deir, the site of large public religious events.

An inscription that was found in a niche on the rockface above a cistern located opposite two other structures to the north of ed-Deir while it was being cleaned in 1991, mentioned "the mrzh' of Obodat the god". Mrzh' is interpreted as a private religious group with a limited number of members. The inscription may be indication that the entire Deir complex was dedicated to a cult of worship centered around either a deity named Obodat for whom the Nabataean king, Obodas I was named, or that he was deified for his deeds.

=== Christian ===
The interior chamber of ed-Deir has several incised crosses carved into the wall, which may indicate that the space might have been used as a church or hermitage.

After the abandonment of Byzantine Petra with its main churches near the city center, a Christian presence in the form of Greek Orthodox hermits and cenobites living in lavra- or coenobium-type communities of among the ruins of the wider ancient metropolis and its necropoles continued all until the late 19th century. The area around ed-Deir shows a particular density of such communities, who even left an epigraph on the entablature of the monumental facade, observed by Burckhardt in 1812, but which had already disappeared by 1865.

Magister Thetmarus (Thietmar) documented in 1217 that two Greek monks were living near Petra, but their abode was at the church on the summit of Mount Aaron ('Jabal an-Nabi Harûn', lit. the mountain of the Prophet Aaron, some 5 km SW of Petra), not at ed-Deir (see original Latin text here and its German translation here).

== 3D documentation with laser-scanning ==
The monastery was spatially documented in 2013 by the non-profit research group Zamani Project, which specialises in 3D digital documentation of tangible cultural heritage. A 3D model can be viewed here. The data generated by the Zamani Project creates a permanent record that can be used for research, education, restoration, and conservation.

== In popular culture ==
The monastery has appeared in several Hollywood movies, such as the 2009 film Transformers: Revenge of the Fallen.

== See also ==
- Al-Khazneh
- Siq
