= Jordan Tourism Development Project =

The first USAID funded Jordan Tourism Development Project ran for three years (2005–2008) providing technical assistance, training and other services to help Jordan implement its National Tourism Strategy designed to double tourism receipts by 2010. It promoted Jordan’s competitiveness as an international tourism destination by establishing a strong institutional and regulatory framework that promoted private-sector investment, stimulates tourism growth and preserves national tourism assets and the environment.

The project's aim was also to assists private investors to develop new and comprehensive products and services across the tourism value chain. It is increasing awareness among Jordanians about the importance of the tourism sector, and aims to position the industry as the employer of choice.

The project has continued past 2008 with funding for the second Jordan Tourism Development Project dubbed Siyaha. This second project is a $28 million, five-year (2008–2013) that is working to further improve Jordan’s competitiveness as an international tourism destination. The project works in partnership with the Ministry of Tourism & Antiquities on such initiatives as developing a new national hotel classification system, improving tourism research and destination marketing, enhancing ecotourism, developing better handicrafts and upgrading vocational training in tourism. The USAID/Jordan Tourism Development Project II is supporting the ministry in developing tourist sites by upgrading archaeological site management, interpretation and investment promotion at key sites, especially Petra and the Amman Citadel.

== Project Aims ==
The project builds on the work of the first USAID/Jordan Tourism Development Project (2005–2008), which supported tourism development in Madaba, Wadi Rum and Amman, and is expanding into new technical and geographical areas. To achieve its goals, the project is focusing on nine main initiatives:

1. Strengthening legal and institutional capacities;
2. Enhancing visitor experiences;
3. Destination and product marketing;
4. Human resources development;
5. Quality assurance and enhancement;
6. Handicraft sector development;
7. Industry development;
8. Tourism awareness;
9. Gender and environment.

== Notable Successes ==
Wadi Rum crafts workshop
