= Al-Khazneh =

Ancient temple in Petra, Jordan

- الخزنة
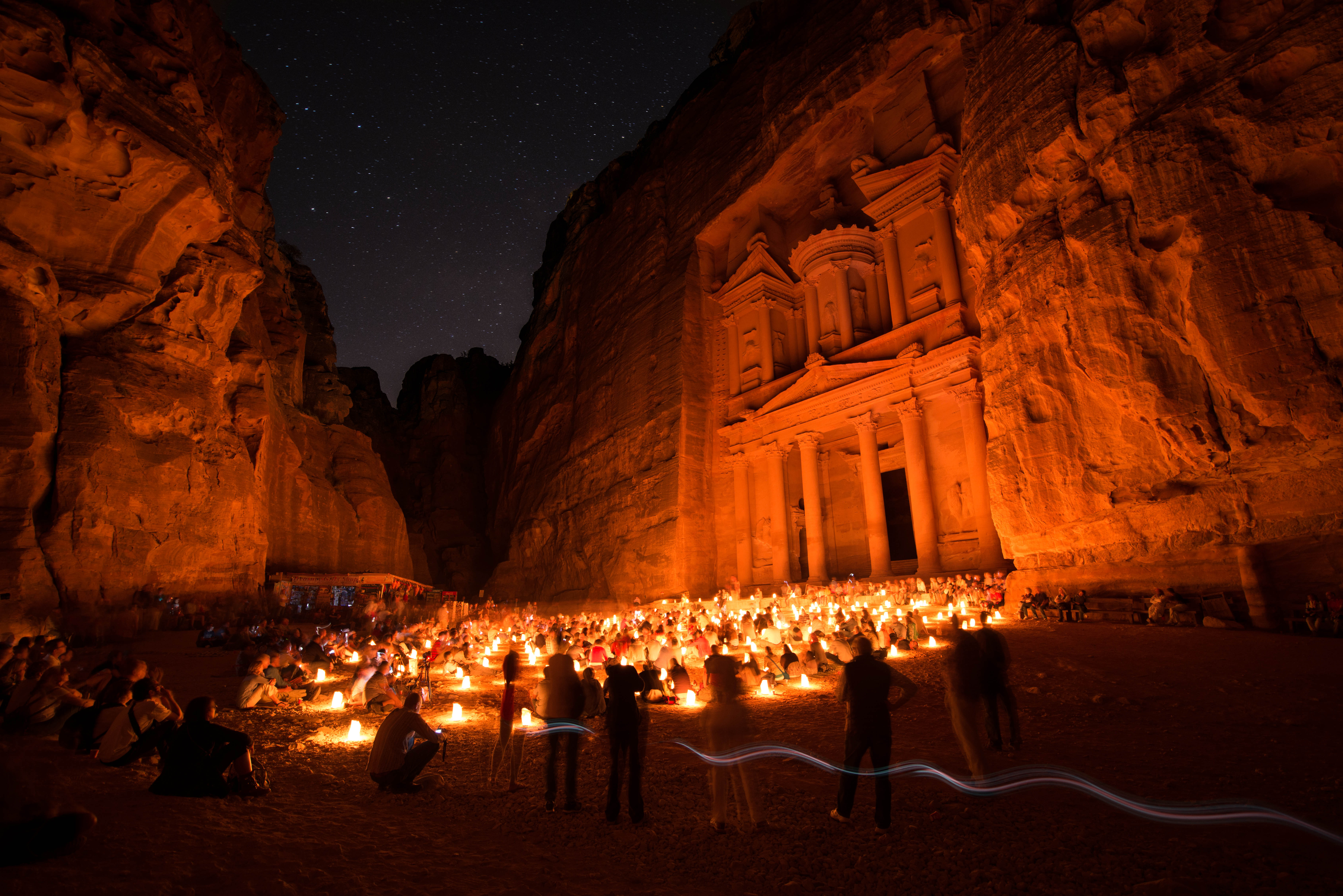
- The iconic facade of Al-Khazneh viewed from the Siq
- Interactive map of Al-Khazneh
- Location: Petra, Ma'an Governorate, Jordan
- Coordinates: 30°19′19″N 35°27′06″E
- Type: Rock-cut mausoleum
- Material: Sandstone
- Width: 25.3 metres (83 ft)
- Height: 39.1 metres (128 ft)

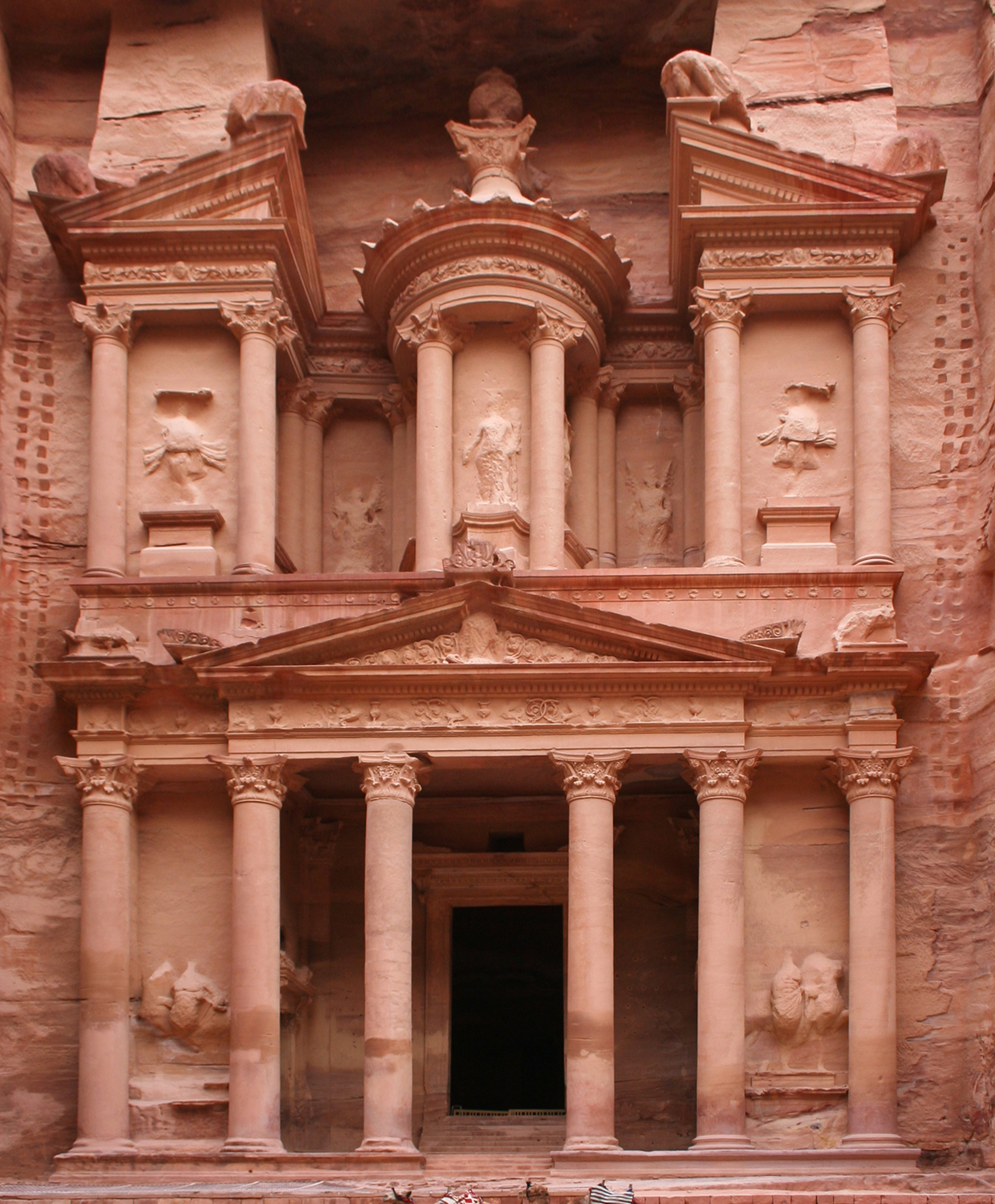
Al-Khazneh

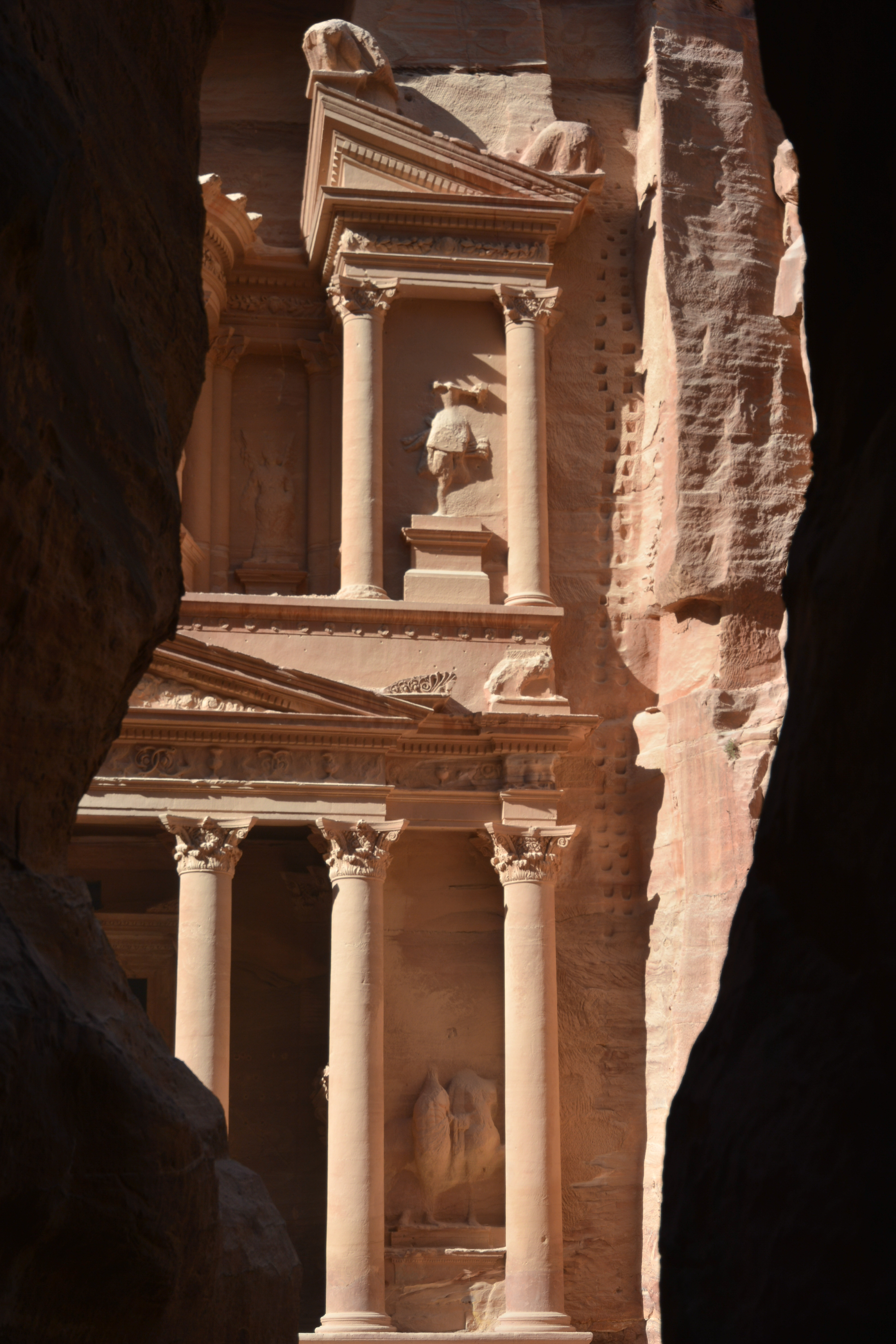
The first glimpse of Petra's Treasury (Al-Khazneh) upon exiting the Siq

Al-Khazneh (Arabic: الخزنة; IPA: [al.xaz.na], "The Treasury"), also known as Khaznat el-Far'oun (treasury of the pharaoh), is one of the most elaborate rock-cut tombs in Petra, a city of the Nabatean Kingdom inhabited by the Arabs in ancient times. As with most of the other buildings in this ancient town, including the Monastery (Arabic: Ad Deir), this structure was carved out of a sandstone rock face.

It is thought that Al-Khazneh was built as a mausoleum and crypt at the beginning of the 1st century AD during the reign of Aretas IV Philopatris.

It is one of the most popular tourist attractions in both Jordan and the region.

== Name ==
Al-Khazneh means "The Treasury" in Arabic, a name derived from legends regarding the decorative stone urn high on the second level, which in reality is solid sandstone. It came to be called "Al-Khazneh" in the early 19th century by the area's Bedouins as they had believed it contained treasures.

One legend is that the Egyptian Pharaoh and some of his armies escaped the closing of the Red Sea, created the Khazneh by magic as a safe place for his treasury, and continued in his pursuit of Moses. This led to the name Khaznat el-Far'oun, "Treasury of the Pharaoh". Significant damage from bullets can be seen on the urn, which the Jordanian government attributes to Bedouins who believed the legend.

== Description ==
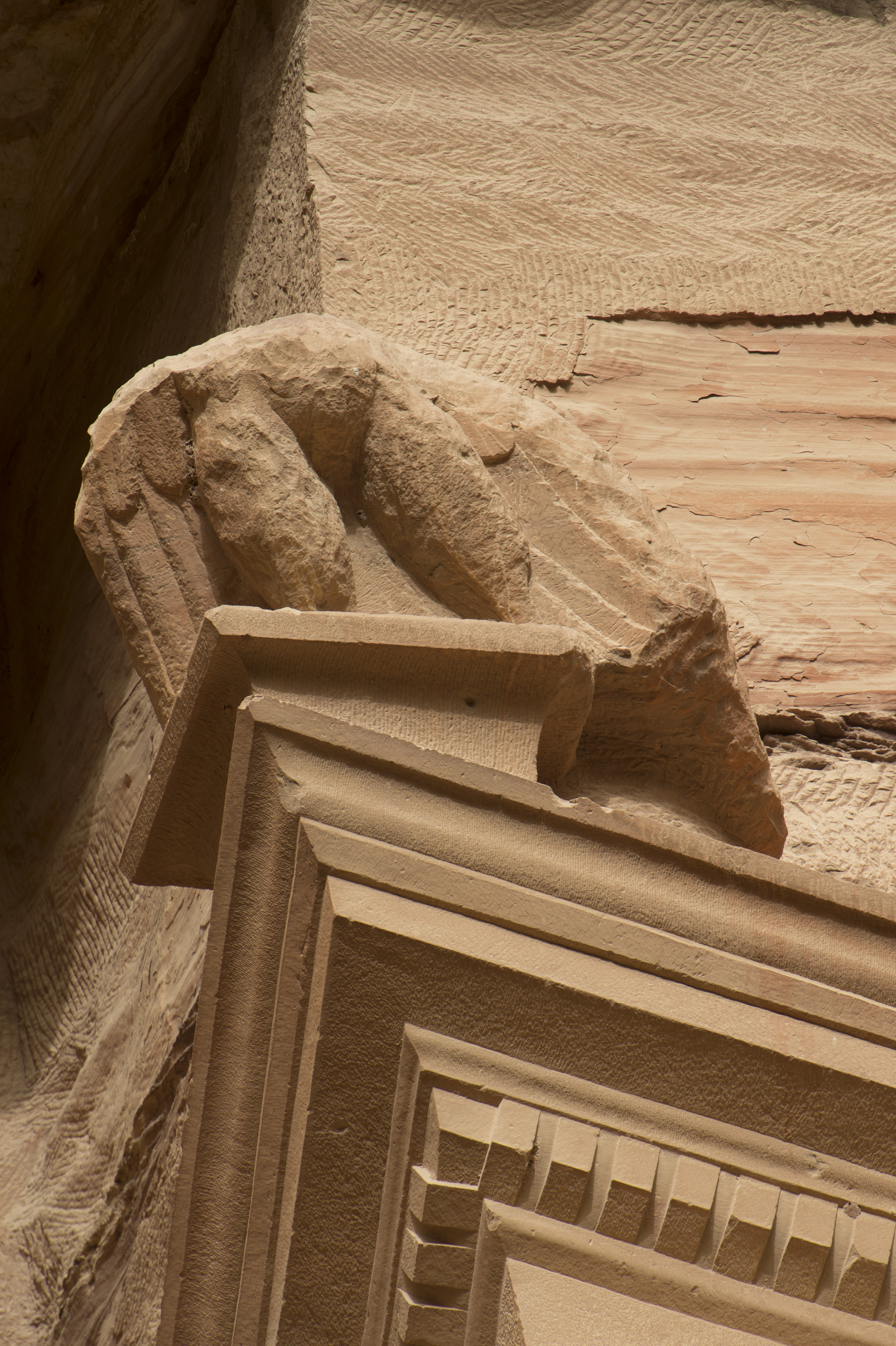
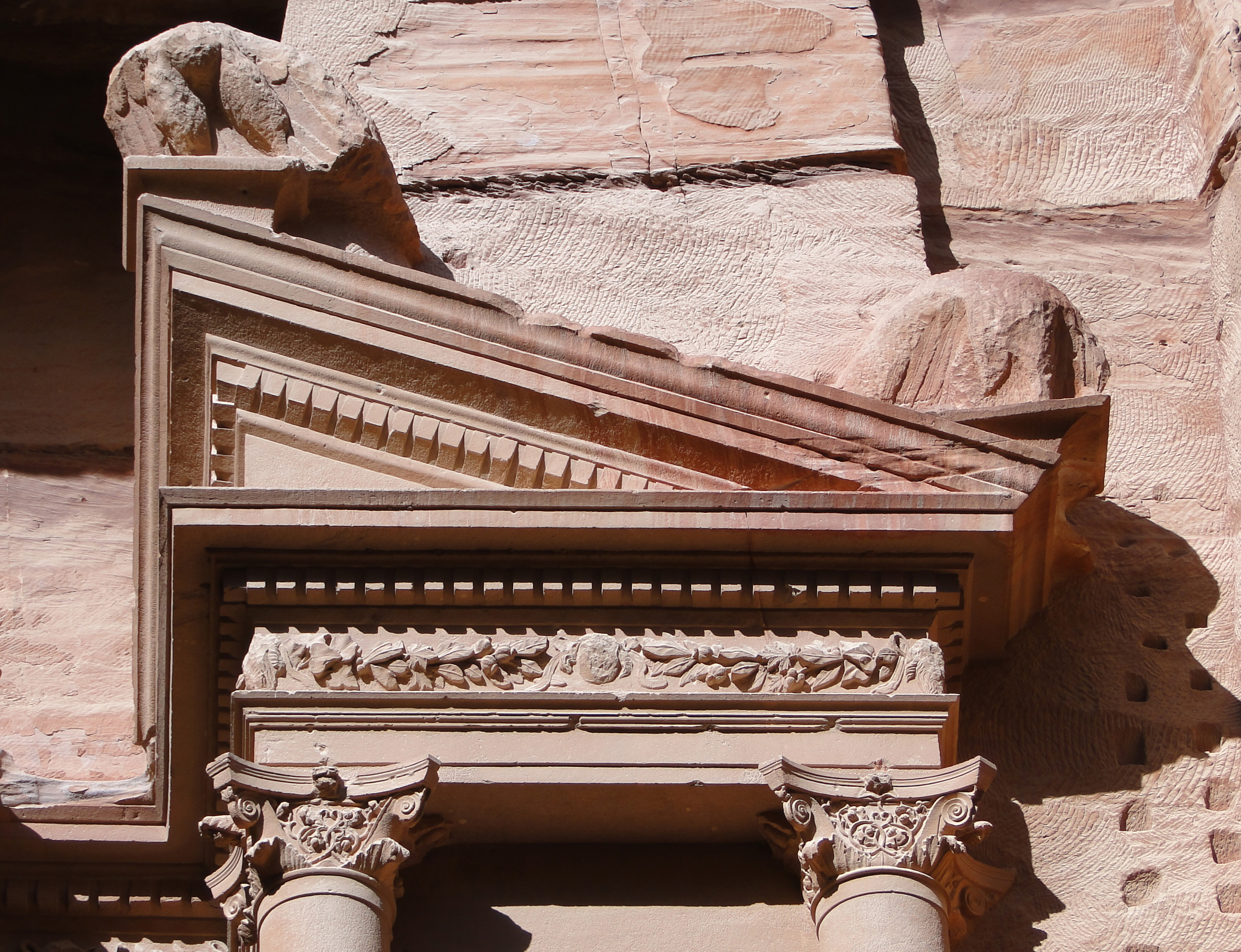
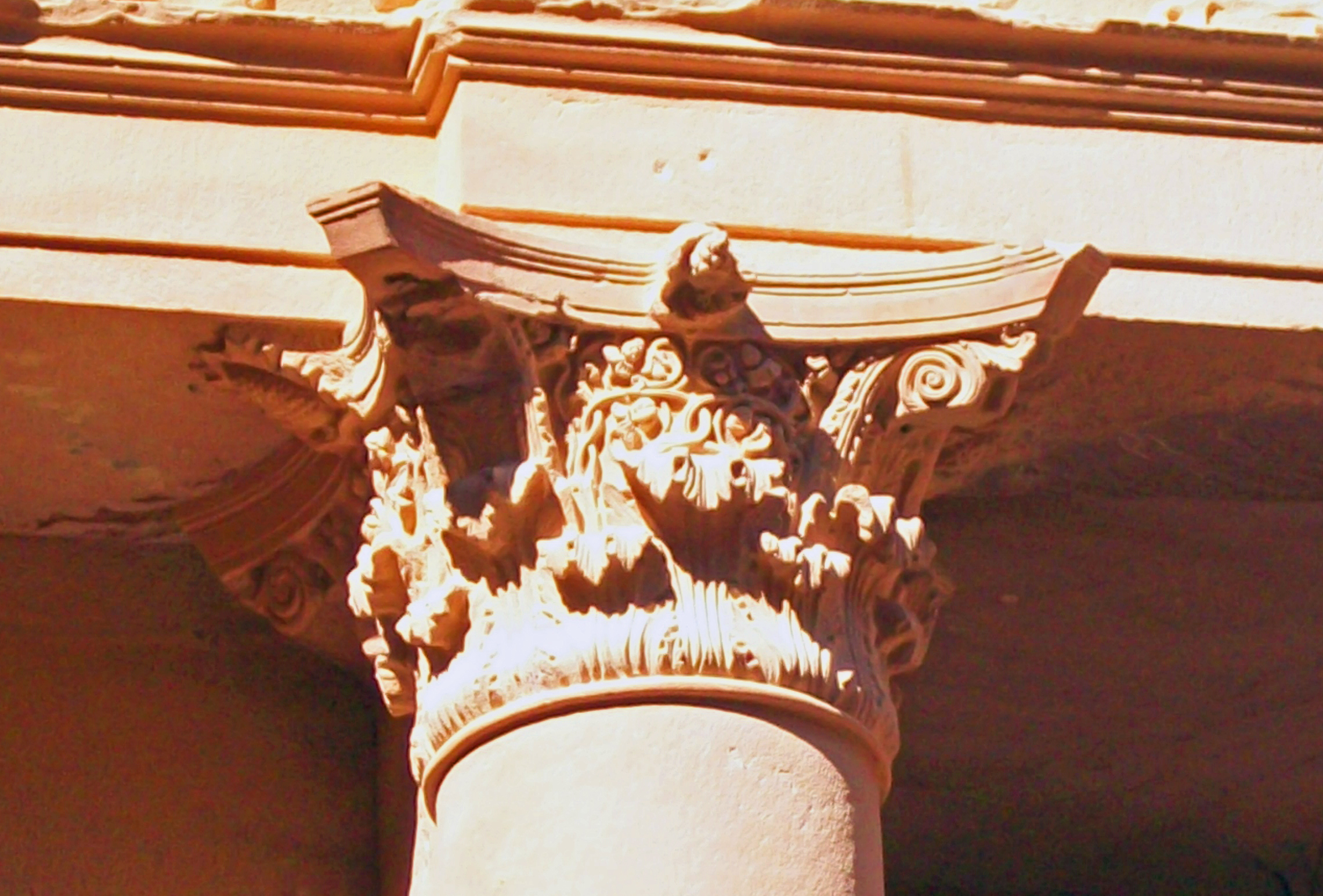
Details of the columns

Many of the building's architectural details have eroded during the two millennia since it was carved and sculpted from the cliff. The sculptures are thought to be those of various mythological figures associated with the afterlife. On top are figures of four eagles that would carry away the souls. The figures on the upper level are dancing Amazons with double axes. The entrance is flanked by statues of the twins Castor and Pollux who lived partly on Olympus and partly in the underworld.

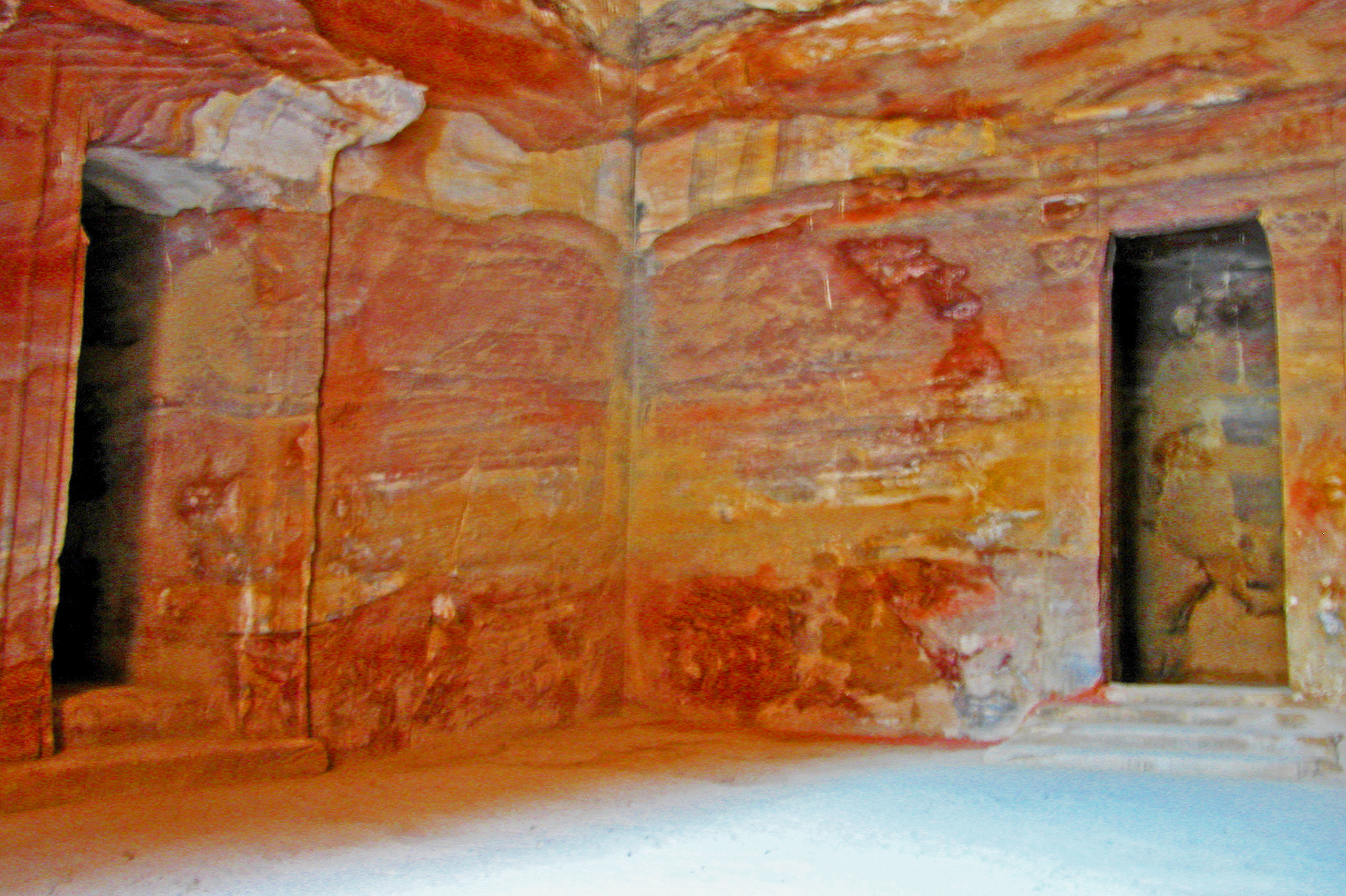
View inside the primary chamber

In contrast to the elaborate façade, the interior comprises a plain main chamber and three antechambers with an interior volume of around 2,000 m^{3} (71,000 cu ft).

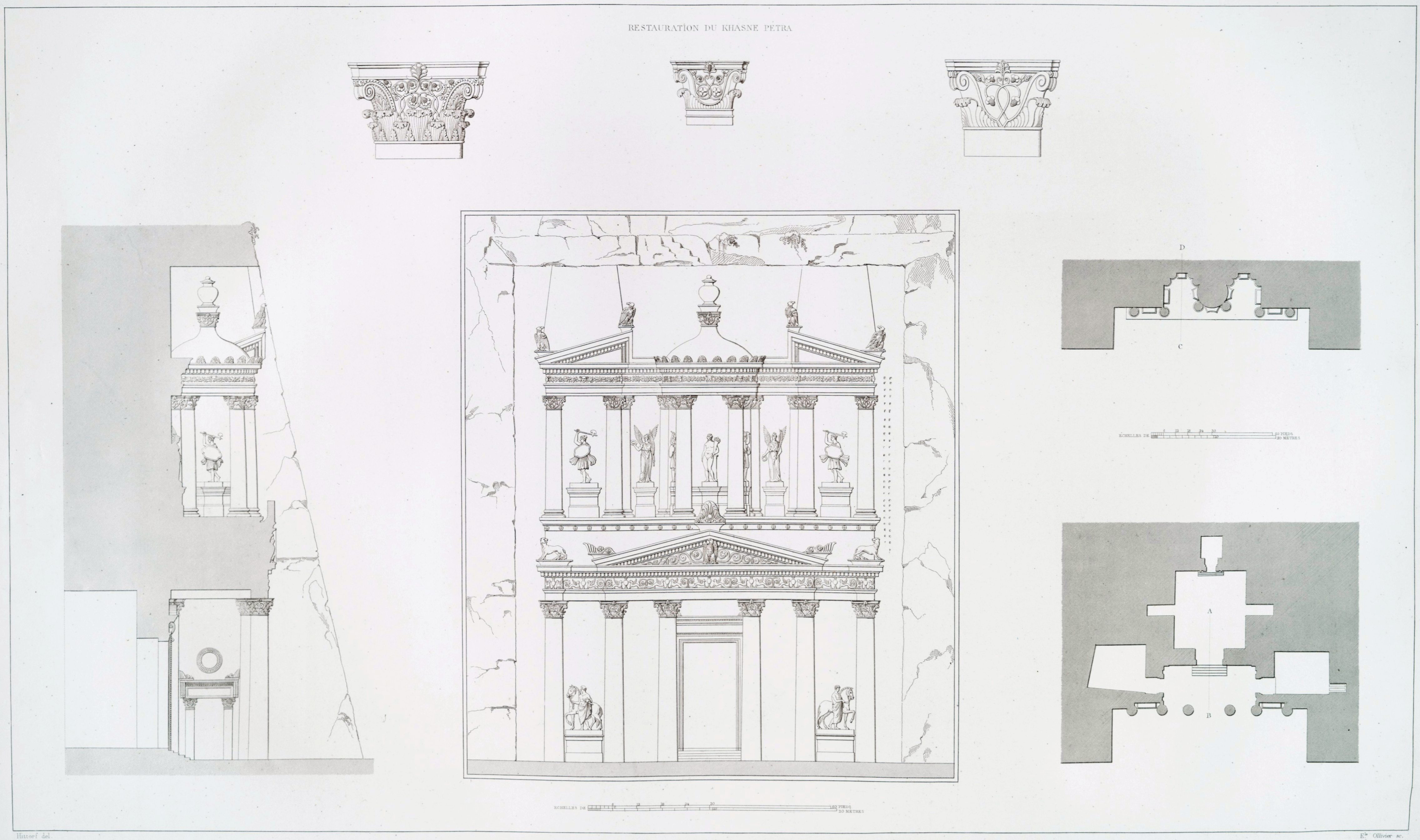

1830 lithograph with elevations, and plan of each story (at half scale)

== Impact of tourism ==
In 1812, the city of Petra and Al-Khazneh were noted by Swiss explorer Burckhardt. As Western Europe continued to explore the Middle East, tourism became more common, and by the 1920s, a small hotel had opened near Petra. While Petra was not as popular as larger, more central cities, like Cairo, tourism started changing the economy and social structure of the nearby Bedouin people.

Tourism is now a significant source of income in Jordan, comprising around 20% of the GDP. Hotels, souvenir shops, restaurants, and horse rental services are all found within a few-mile radius of Petra itself. While the economic effects have been largely positive, the site faces threats from increased tourism.

Humidity from large crowds of people visiting the site can cause damage to the dry sandstone. White spots have appeared on walls and columns from stearic acid deposition due to hands resting against the walls. The Khazneh surface has receded by 40 mm in less than ten years from touching, leaning, or rubbing on the walls.

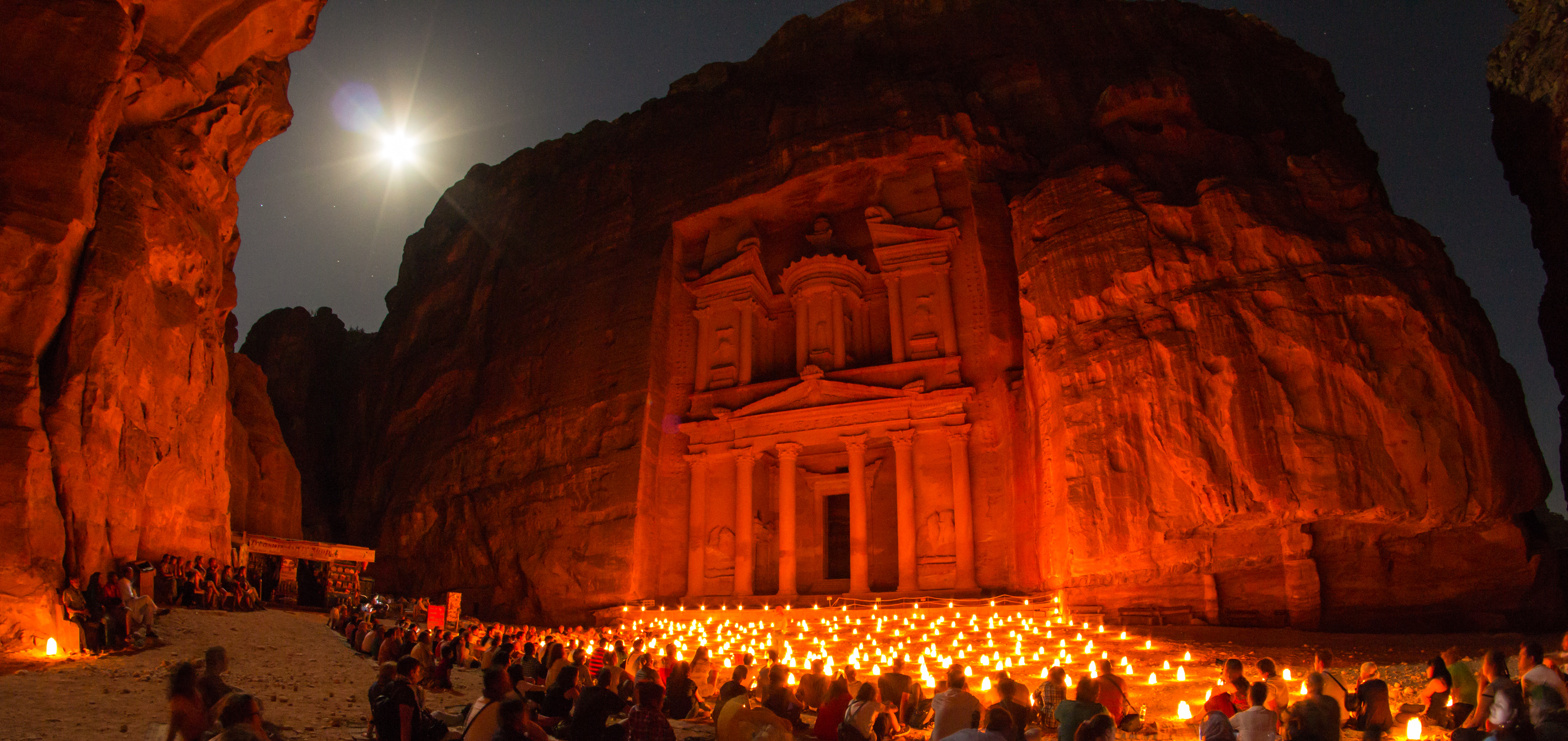
Tourists at Al-Khazneh, at night

== In popular culture ==
The Treasury has appeared in many Hollywood films, gaining particular fame after being featured in climactic scenes in the 1989 film Indiana Jones and the Last Crusade, in which its façade is represented as the entrance to the final resting place of the Holy Grail. The interior scenes of the temple were filmed at Elstree Studios in England.

PBS's Nova specials Lost City of Stone and Ancient Megastructures: Petra, television series from PBS and National Geographic, were dedicated to the Khazneh, and the theories of Nabatean construction techniques and engineering.

The Treasury is also depicted in Hergé's The Red Sea Sharks, one of the Adventures of Tintin, Sinbad and the Eye of the Tiger, Sky 1 travel series An Idiot Abroad, The Sisters of Mercy 1988 music video for "Dominion", the history series The Naked Archeologist, the Korean drama Misaeng, and the video games Overwatch and Mortal Kombat Annihilation. In the 2007 video game Assassin's Creed, the relief where Altaïr Ibn-La'Ahad confronts Robert de Sable in the Jerusalem Vault is modeled after The Treasury.

The Treasury is depicted in The Rising of the Shield Hero in both the Anime and Manga as an ancient building in Melromarc called "The Alchemists' Cave" that belonged to a long-dead alchemist of unknown intent.

== 3D model with laser scanning ==
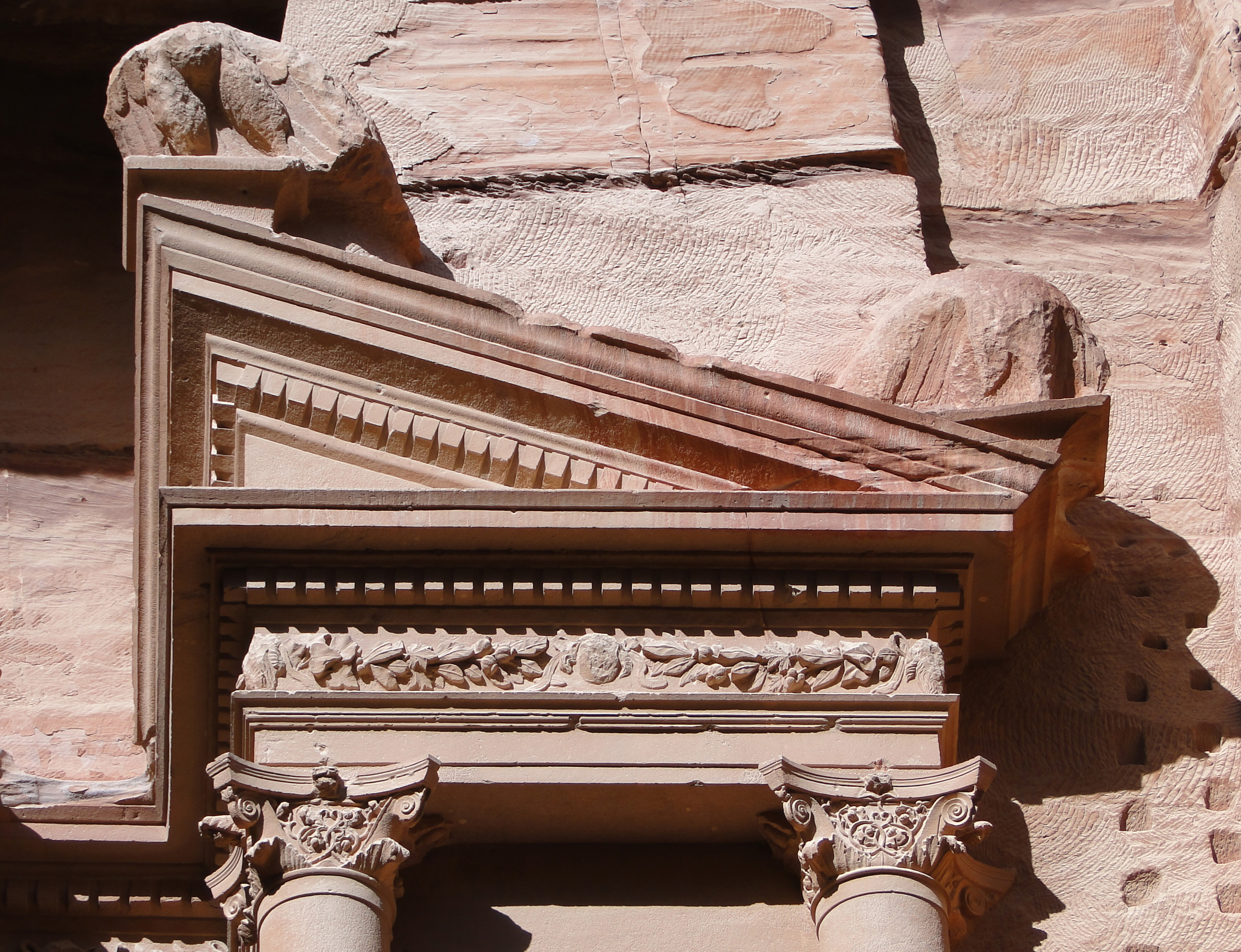
Detail of the façade

The Treasury was spatially documented in 2012 by the non-profit research group Zamani Project, which specializes in 3D digital documentation of tangible cultural heritage. A 3D model can be viewed at zamaniproject.org. The data generated by the Zamani Project create a permanent record that can be used for research, education, restoration and conservation.
