= Zamani Project =

South African research group

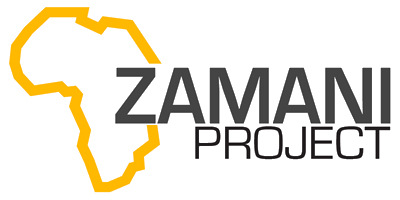
- Formation: 2004
- Founder: Prof. Heinz Ruther
- Products: 3D Models, Plans, Section, Elevations, 360 degrees Panorama Tours, Geographic Information Systems
- Methods: Laser scanning, digital modeling, GIS
- Website: zamaniproject.org

The Zamani Project is part of the African Cultural Heritage Sites and Landscapes Database. Zamani is a research group at the University of Cape Town, which acquires, models, presents and manages spatial and other data from cultural heritage sites. The present focus of the Zamani project is Africa, with the principal objective of developing "The African Cultural Heritage Sites and Landscapes Database". Zamani comes from the Swahili phrase "Hapo zamani za kale" which means "Once upon a time", and can be used to mean 'the past'. The word is derived from Farsi(Persian) root for temporal vocabulary, 'Zaman,' and appears in several languages around the world.

== History ==
The Zamani initiative was conceptualised in the Geomatics Division of the University of Cape Town by Professor Heinz Rüther in 2001 in collaboration with ITHAKA and Aluka as the "African Cultural Heritage Sites and Landscapes Database" in 2004 with a number of sequential grants from the Andrew W. Mellon Foundation. The project developed out of a long history of heritage documentation in the Geomatics division reaching from conventional mapping of archaeological sites in the early stages of the project to advanced digital modeling of complex sites in its present phase.

== Motivation ==
The documentation project aims to capture spatial information to create a permanent record of important heritage sites for restoration and conservation purposes and as a record for future generations. The project seeks to provide material for education, research and site management and increase international awareness of African heritage on a not-for-profit basis.

== Data ==
Spatial data of architectural structures and historical landscapes are acquired by means of laser scanning, conventional surveys, GPS surveys and photogrammetric imaging with calibrated cameras. Satellite images, aerial photography and full-dome panorama photography are also employed as are contextual photography and videos. The data are captured by the project team during field campaigns. The acquired data are processed to produce Geographic Information Systems (GIS), 3D computer models, maps, architectural sections and building plans and interactive panorama tours of the heritage sites. Sites are seen in the context of their physical environment and therefore landscapes surrounding sites are modelled in 3D using satellite and aerial imagery wherever possible.

== Sites ==
The following is a list of sites which have been documented:

Algeria
1. Djémila
2. M'Zien (Lemzyen)

Cameroon

1. Mandara Hills: DGB I & II

Ethiopia

1. Lalibela: 13 rock-hewn churches
2. Axum: Stele-field
3. Gondar: Fasil Ghebbi

Ghana

1. Elmina: Elmina Castle
2. Besease/Kumasi: Ashanti Shrine

Jordan

1. Petra: Siq
2. Petra: Treasury (Al-Khazneh)
3. Petra: Monastery (Ad Deir)
4. Petra: Urn Tomb
5. Petra: Tomb of the Roman Soldier
6. Petra: Palace Tomb
7. Petra: Corinthian Tomb
8. Petra: Silk Tomb
9. Petra: Theater
10. Petra: Qasr al-Bint
11. Petra: Great Temple
12. Petra: Facade Tombs
13. Petra: Temple of the Winged Lions
14. Petra: Turkmeniyeh Tomb
15. Petra: Soldier Tomb (Wadi Farasa)
16. Petra: Garden Tomb (Wadi Farasa)
17. Petra: Renaissance Tomb (Wadi Farasa)
18. Petra: Triclinium (Wadi Farasa)
19. Petra: Djinn Blocks (before Siq entrance)
20. Petra: Obelisk Tomb (before Siq entrance)
21. Petra: landscape of Wadi Musa and the landscape of Wadi Farasa

Kenya

1. Lamu: Fortress, Swahili Building and historical street scene
2. Shela: Shiathna-Asheri Mosque
3. Gede: Palace, Mosque and buildings
4. Namoratung'a: Stelae field
5. Turkana Village: village huts
6. Tot Village: village huts

Mali

1. Djenne: Great Mosque
2. Timbuktu: Friday Mosque

Mozambique

1. Mozambique Island: Fortress and Chapel

Myanmar

1. Bagan (Several Temple & Pagodas)

Sri Lanka

1. Medirigiriya Watadageya
2. Polonnaruwa

South Africa

1. Mapungubwe: Iron Age site of Mapungubwe Hill, plus rock art site
2. Pretoria: Union Buildings
3. Cape Town: Good Hope Castle
4. Wonderwerk Cave: cave with early human occupation
5. Cederberg: 6 rock art sites
6. Saldhana: Stone age site
7. Langebaan: Paleontological site
8. Drakensberg: 2 rock art sites

Sudan

1. Musawwarat es-Sufra: Great Enclosure temple complex and Temple of Apedemak

Tanzania

1. Kilwa Kisiwani: Fortress, Mosque, Palace
2. Songo Mnara: Palace, Mosque, Buildings, Graveyard
3. Engaruka: Drystone structures
4. Stone Town in Zanzibar: 2 Persian baths and Beit Al-Amani

Uganda

1. Nyero: 5 rock art sites
2. Mukongolo: 3 rock art sites
3. Kampiri: rock art site
4. Lolui Island: rock art site
5. Kokoro: 3 rock art sites

Zimbabwe

1. Great Zimbabwe: Great Enclosure and Hill complex

=== Undocumented sites ===
These sites have been documented by the project team but not included in the database 1. Algeria, Tassili: Engravings (TARA)
2. Egypt, Luxor: Valley of the Queens (Getty Conservation Institute, L.A.)
3. Jordan, Petra: SIQ canyon and tombs in co-operation with UNESCO
4. Tanzania, Laetoli: Hominid Trackway (Getty Conservation Institute, L.A.)
5. United Arab Emirates, Al Ain: Archaeological site (ADACH, Abu Dhabi)

== Access to data ==
The Zamani Project website provides a showcase for the data it produces. Subsets of the 3D data, such as panorama tours and flythrough animations can be viewed on the site as well as examples of plans, sections and photographs.

== Funding ==
The African Cultural Heritage Sites and Landscapes Database exclusively funded by the Andrew W. Mellon Foundation, New York. Administrative support, office space and other academic services are provided by the University of Cape Town and the Geomatics Division at UCT. Additional funds are generated through documentation work for the Getty Conservation Institute, Los Angeles and the World Monuments Fund, New York. In the early stages of the project UNESCO provided financial support for documentation in Lalibela.

== Zamani team ==
The Zamani team members comprises four Chief Scientific Officers (Ralph Schroeder, Roshan Bhurtha, Stephen Wessels and Bruce McDonald) under the leadership of the Principal Investigator, Prof. Heinz Rüther. Interns from UCT and international universities also occasionally join the team. Occasionally Christoph Held (former team member, currently works with laser scanning manufacturer Zoller and Fröhlich (Z+F)) and Professor Werner Stempfhuber (from the Beuth University in Berlin) accompany the Zamani team on field campaigns.
