= Siq =

Main entrance to city of Petra

Coordinates: 30°19′20″N 35°27′6″E

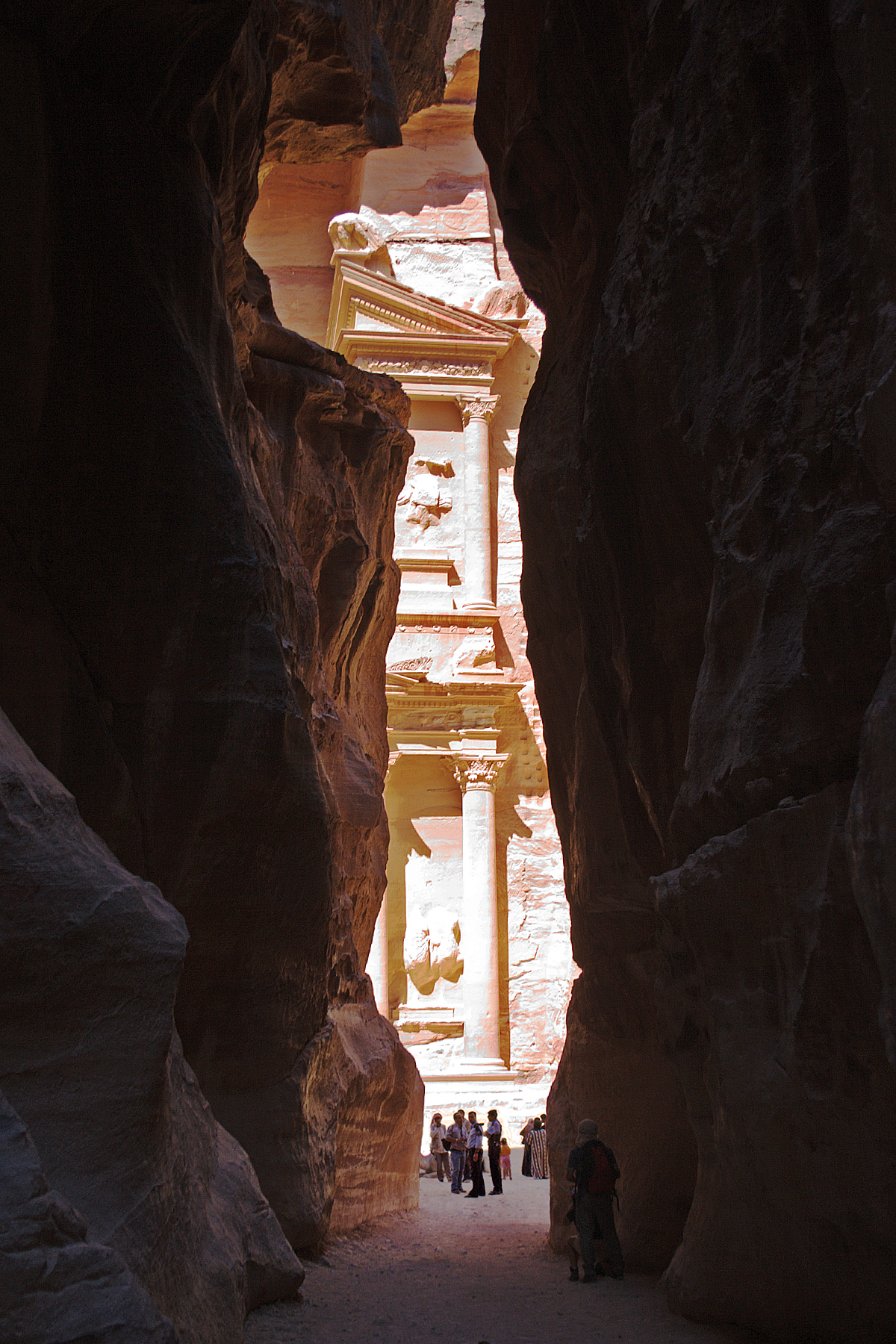
The Treasury, as seen from as-Siq, right before the passage ends

A walk down the Siq, 2018

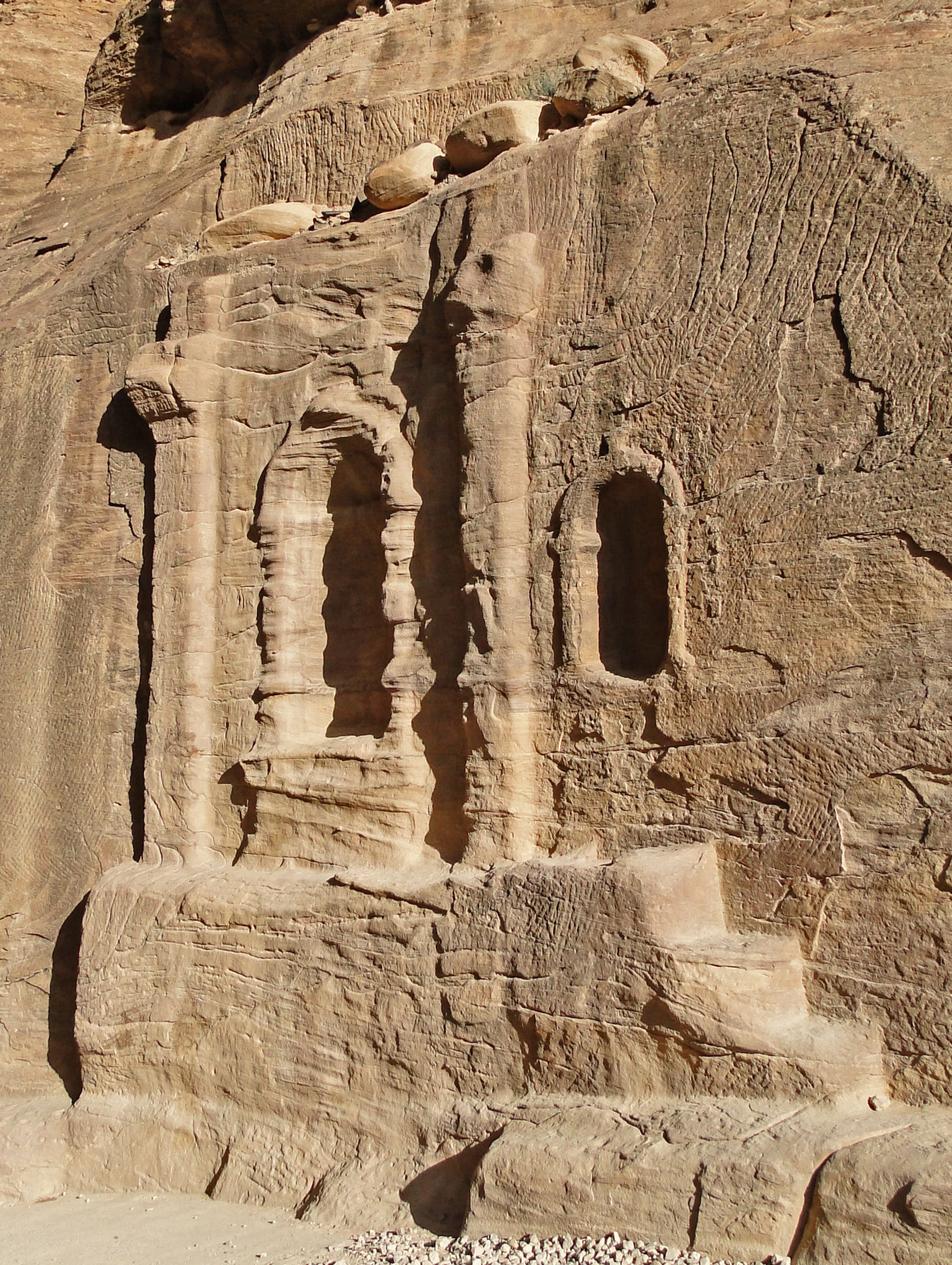
A niche at the entrance of al-Siq

The Siq (Arabic: السيق, transliterated al-Sīq, transcribed as-Sīq, (Note: Al is assimilated and pronounced as because s (of Sīq) is a sun letter.) literally 'the Shaft') is the main entrance to the ancient Nabatean city of Petra in southern Jordan. Also known as Siqit, it is a dim, narrow gorge (in some points no more than 3 metres (10 ft) wide) and winds its way approximately 1.2 kilometres (3/4 mi) and ends at Petra's most elaborate ruin, Al-Khazneh (the Treasury). A wide valley outside leading to the Siq is known as the Bab as-Sīq (Gateway to the Siq).

== Description ==
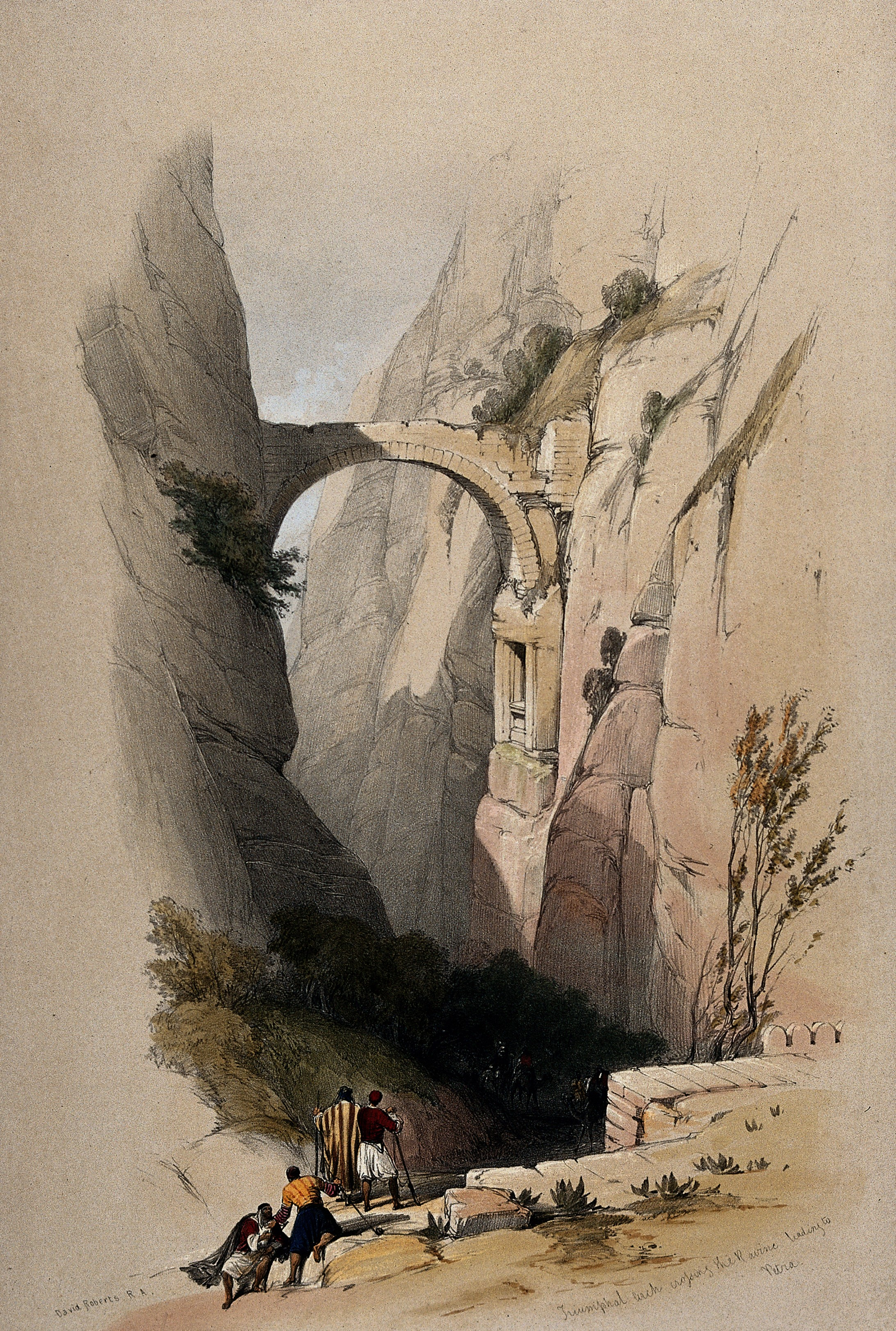
The arch, destroyed by an earthquake in 1896, drawn in 1839. From The Holy Land, Syria, Idumea, Arabia, Egypt, and Nubia

Unlike slot canyons such as Antelope Canyon in the American Southwest, which are directly shaped by water, the Siq is a natural geological fault split apart by tectonic forces; only later was it worn smooth by water. The walls that enclose the Siq stand between 91–182 metres (299–597 ft) in height.

The entrance to the Siq contains a huge dam, reconstructed in 1963 and again in 1991, designed to bar the mouth of the Siq and reroute the waters of Wadi Musa. The dam is a fairly true reconstruction of what the Nabataeans did to control Wadi Musa between the 1st century BC and the beginning of the 1st century AD. The entrance also contains the remnants of a monumental arch, of which only the two abutments and some hewn stones of the arch itself have survived. The arch collapsed in 1896 following an earthquake, but its appearance is known from the lithographs of Matthew Boulby and David Roberts.

The Siq was used as the grand caravan entrance into Petra. Along both walls of the fissure are a number of votive niches containing baetyli, which suggest that the Siq was sacred to the Nabatean people. In 1998, a group of statues were uncovered when digging was conducted to lower the road by more than six feet. Although the upper part is greatly eroded, it is still possible to recognise the figures of two merchants, each leading two camels. The figures are almost twice lifesize.

Along the Siq are some underground chambers, the function of which has not yet been clarified. The possibility that they were tombs has been excluded, and archaeologists find it difficult to believe that they were dwellings. The majority consensus is that they housed the guards that defended the main entrance to Petra.

== 3D documentation ==
The Zamani Project spatially documented the Siq and most parts of Petra Archaeological Park in 2011–2014, as part of the UNESCO Siq Stability Project. The non-profit organisation specialises in 3D digital documentation of tangible cultural heritage, and seeks to increase awareness and knowledge of heritage in Africa and beyond. The data generated by Zamani are used for research, education, restoration, conservation and as a record for future generations.

== See also ==
- Tourism in Jordan
