= Arabia Petraea =

Roman province (106–630s)

Province of Arabia Petraea Provincia Arabia Petraea (Latin) Ἐπαρχία Πετραίας Ἀραβίας (Greek) مقاطعة البتراء العربية (Arabic)
- Roman province
- 106–c. 634
- Boundaries of Arabia Petraea (red) within the Roman Empire, c. 125
- Capital: Petra (first); Bosra (last)
- Demonym: Arab; Arabian
- Historical era: Ancient Rome
  - Roman conquest of Nabataea: 106
  - Creation of Palaestina Salutaris: 390
  - Muslim conquest of the Levant: c. 634
Preceded by	Succeeded by
Nabataean Kingdom; Decapolis	Bilad al-Sham

Arabia Petraea (lit. 'Rocky Arabia') was a Roman province from the 2nd century to the 7th century that was situated mostly in what is now Jordan. The province was established by the Roman Empire in the former territory of the Nabataean Kingdom conquered in 106 AD during the reign of Trajan (r. 98–117) and it existed until it was superseded into Palaestina Salutaris in the fourth century. The territory was briefly lost from the Romans to the Sasanian Empire during the Byzantine–Sasanian War of 602–628 before being indefinitely lost to the Rashidun Caliphate during the Arab–Byzantine Wars.

The territory of Arabia Petraea spanned parts of the modern-day Levant, Jordan, Israel, Palestine, the Sinai Peninsula, and northern Arabian Peninsula. It bordered Syria to the north, Judaea (later Syria Palaestina) to the west, Egypt to the southwest, and Arabia Deserta (the desert interior of the Arabian Peninsula) to the east and southeast. The Romans also categorized a third Arabia, Arabia Felix, in South Arabia.

Arabia Petraea was a key province along the Limes Arabicus, which delineated the Roman Empire's borders throughout the Arabian Desert. It was also the only province in the Near East that the Romans did not gain and subsequently lose during Trajan's reign, unlike Armenia, Assyria, and Mesopotamia. The province's capital city was initially Petra, as it had been under the Nabataeans, but Bosra later served in this capacity. Most of the province's land was a vast desert that was sparsely populated by nomadic Arab tribes, though there were several urban settlements closer to the Jordan River.

== Name ==
After the conquest of the Nabataean Kingdom in 106 AD, the Romans named the newly acquired territory Arabia Petraea. This name was retained until the second half of the fourth century, when the territory of the province came under the new name Palaestinia Tertia Salutaris.

This change was tied to larger, administrative re-organizations that had been underway since the reign of Diocletian (r. 284–305). During Diocletian's reign, most of Arabia's territory was transferred to the province of Palaestinia, with the remainder of Arabia being restricted to the Hauran and Moab. As Palaestina became too large, during the second half of the fourth century (with the exact time a matter of debate), Palaestina was divided into three provinces: Palaestina Prima (First Palestine, capital: Caesarea Maritima, Palaestina Secunda (Second Palestine, capital: Scythopolis, and Palaestina Tertia Salutaris (Third Palestine, capital: Petra). Palaestina Tertia incorporated the regions belonging to the remainder of Arabia.

== Geography ==
The Roman Empire in the time of Hadrian (ruled AD 117–138), showing, in western Asia, the imperial province of Arabia Petraea (SW Syria/Jordan/NW Saudi Arabia/Sinai). A single legion was deployed there in 125 AD.

Arabia Petraea occupied a zone between the settled Levant and the Arabian interior, across much of modern Jordan, southern Syria, the Negev, and northwest Arabia. Its landscape combined the volcanic and agricultural uplands of the Hauran around Bostra, the Transjordan plateau and desert steppe, the highlands of Moab and Edom, and the arid southern corridors that lead to the Gulf of Aqaba. The city Petra, the capital of Arabia Petraea, itself lay in a valley enclosed by steep mountain ranges, leading to its dependence on trade networks and infrastructure.

== Administration ==
Most of Arabia's territories were sparsely populated, as urban settlements was concentrated to the north toward the Jordan river and the region of Hauran. In addition to Petra, major cities included Bosra, Jerash (Gerasa), Canatha, Adraa, Maximianopolis, Philippopolis and Amman (Philadelphia). The only major sea port was Ayla (modern Aqaba), at the tip of the wide Gulf of Aqaba at the Red Sea.

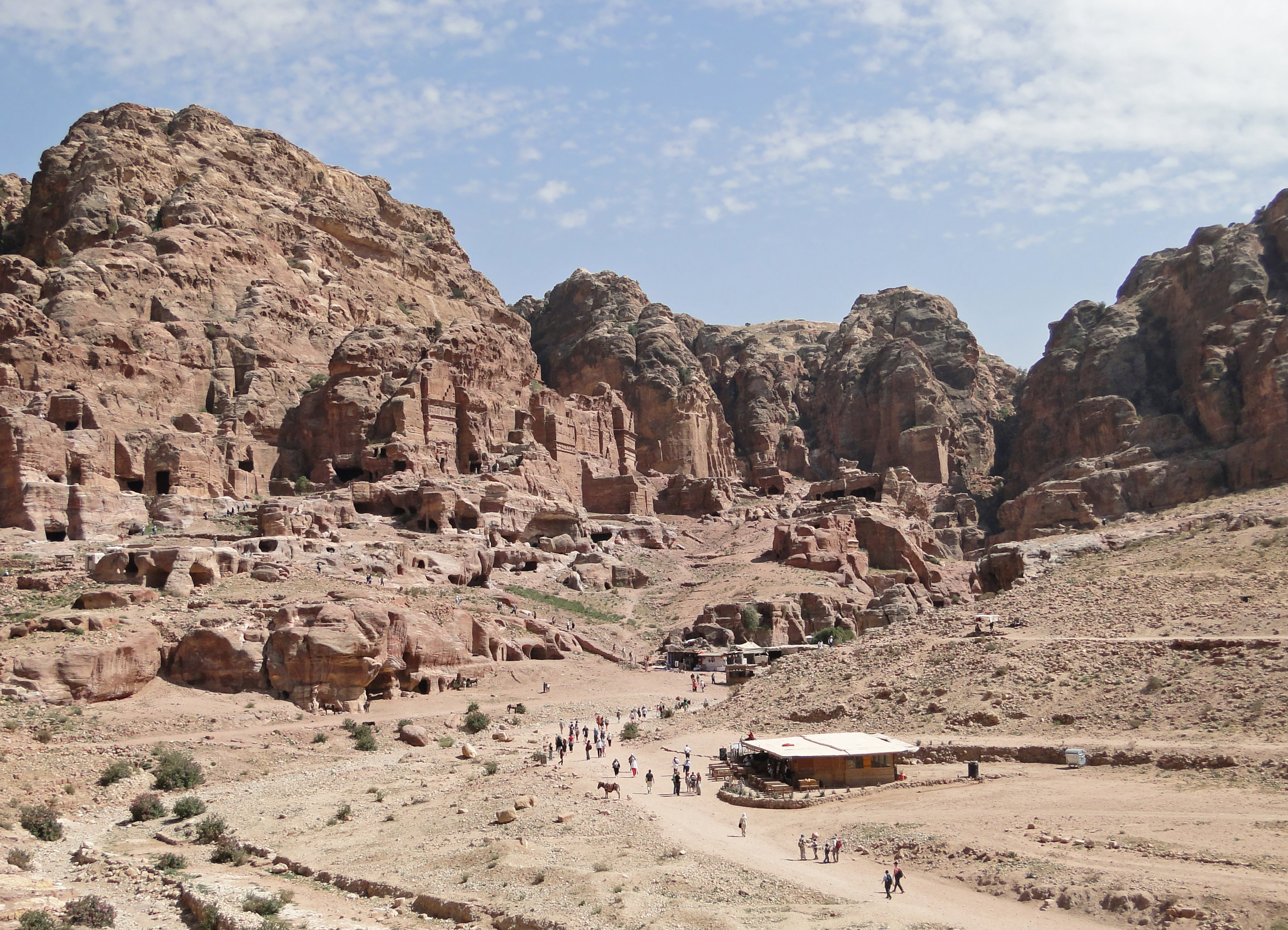
Petra, one of the major cities of Arabian Petra, now designated as a World Heritage Site by UNESCO

In 106 AD, when Aulus Cornelius Palma Frontonianus was governor of Syria, the part of Arabia under the rule of Petra was absorbed into the Roman Empire as part of Arabia Petraea, and Petra became its capital. Petra declined rapidly under Roman rule, in large part from the revision of sea-based trade routes. In 363, an earthquake destroyed many buildings and crippled the vital water management system. The old city of Petra was the capital of the Eastern Roman province of Palaestina III and many churches from the Byzantine period were excavated in and around Petra. In one of them, the Byzantine Church, 140 papyri were discovered, which contained mainly contracts dated from 530s to 590s, establishing that the city was still flourishing in the 6th century.

Petra served as one of the bases for Legio III Cyrenaica, and the governor of the province would spend time in both cities, issuing edicts from both.

=== Urbanism and architecture ===
Across the cities of Arabia Petraea, Roman urban elements were introduced, but their execution varied and was deeply shaped by local traditions. Cities such as Gerasa and Philadelphia adopted Roman features, colonnaded avenues (cardo and decumanus), public monuments, and loosely rectilinear plans, yet their construction techniques and architectural decoration remained strongly influenced by regional Near Eastern and Nabataean practice. Bostra, the provincial capital, exhibited a different character: its buildings followed Roman civic models but were executed in the local basalt, giving the city a severe and non-classical appearance. Philippopolis stands apart, having been founded according to an idealized Roman colonial plan, with strict orthogonal streets and standardized public buildings laid out from its inception. Generally, while Roman models became organizing elements, their construction often relied on local craftsmen who modified classical design, proportions, and decoration. The result was a mixture of Roman, Hellenistic, and indigenous Semitic forms rather than a simple cultural replacement.

== History ==
=== Roman annexation ===
Before Roman control in 106 AD, the area had been ruled by the Nabataean Kingdom. The final ruler of the kingdom before its annexation was Rabbel II, whose reign began in 70 AD until his death in early 105. After Rabbel died, the Nabatean Kingdom entered into a succession crisis, but the Roman emperor at the time, Trajan, refused to recognize any of the claimants of the throne. Instead, Trajan sent his army to annex the Nabataean Kingdom. The invasion consisted of the movement of the Third Cyrenaica legion (from Egypt) advancing onto Bostra from the south and the movement of the Sixth Ferrata legion (from Syria) advancing on Petra from the north. The territory was conquered, and it was converted into the new Roman province of Arabia Petraea. There may have been little resistance to this process, as the former royal troops of Nabataea were joined into the Roman forces.

Bosra was declared to be the capital of the province, and Petra was given the status of metropolis Arabica, "Arabian metropolis" or "Arabian mother city", as a sign of its importance.

After Trajan's annexation of the kingdom, during the phase of consolidation of the new territory, Trajan constructed a road called the Via Nova Traiana. It ran approximately 430 km from the Syrian boundary to the Red Sea and helped link the new province's major centers and corridors, especially Bostra, Philadelphia, al-Rabbah, Petra, and the route toward Aila/Aqaba, further enabling Roman administration, military movement, taxation, and official travel.

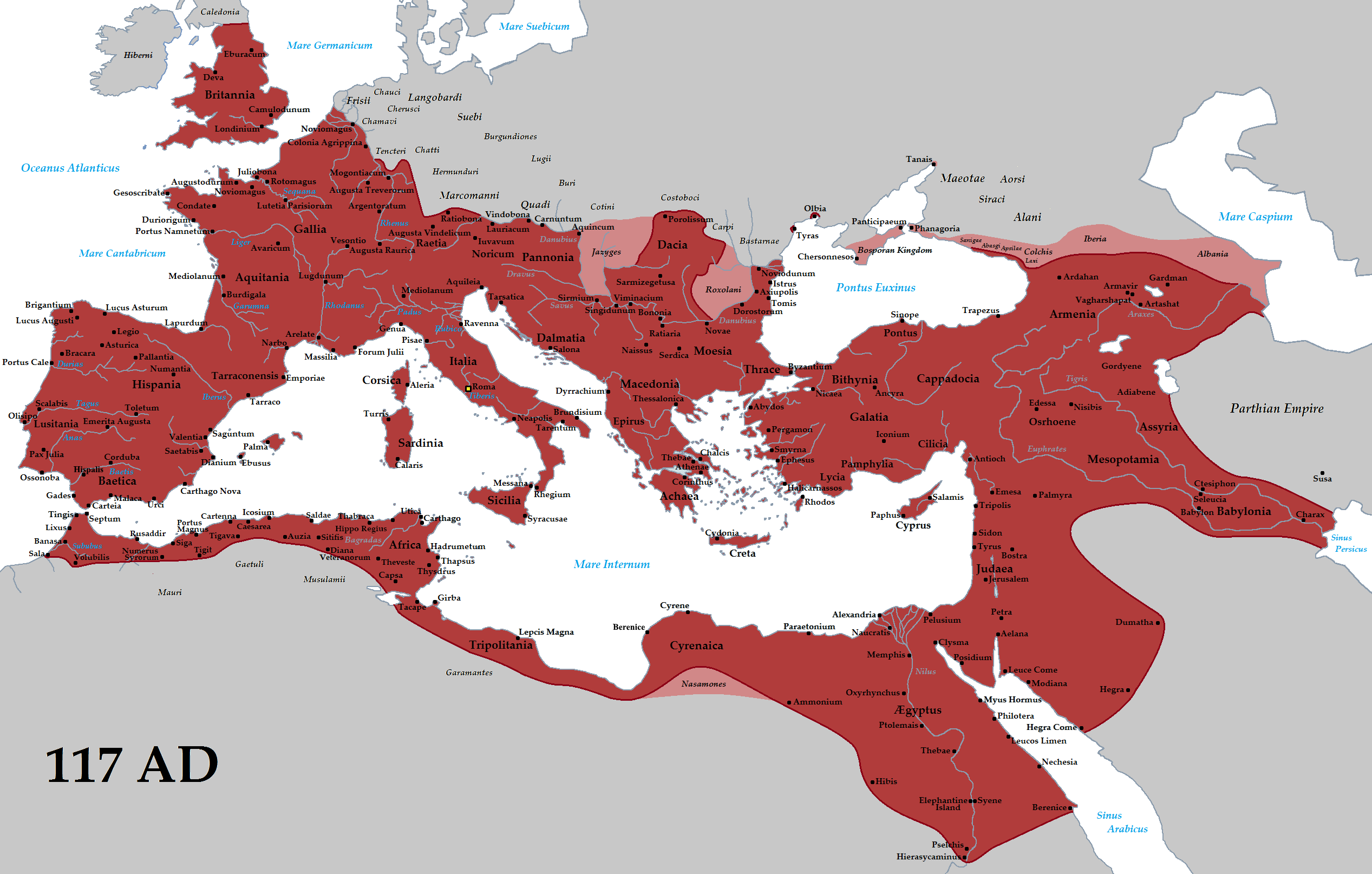
Trajan control of Arabia until Hegra (actual Mada'in Salih)

In the 1960s and 1970s, evidence was discovered that Roman legions occupied Mada'in Salih under Trajan in the Hijaz mountain area of northwestern Arabia, increasing the extension of the Arabia Petraea province south.

The Bar Kokhba Revolt of 132–136 CE, though centered in the neighboring Judaea, may have caused unrest in Arabia as well. Documents record individuals fleeing from Zoar, east of the Dead Sea in Arabia, to Ein Gedi on its western, Judaean shore shortly after the revolt broke out. Historian Glen Bowersock argued for Nabataean involvement, pointing to a wider spread of hostilities than previously assumed, including into northern Transjordan and among Safaitic tribes as far as Gerasa. He cited inscriptions at Gerasa in which the name of the provincial governor, Haterius Nepos, had been erased, along with a Safaitic graffito describing a tribesman who "rebelled" for three years against "Nepos the tyrant," though he acknowledged these readings are not entirely certain. The province also contributed troops to the suppression effort. Reinforcements from Legio III Cyrenaica, then based in Bostra, arrived in Judaea. Arabia is likewise thought to be among the regions from which migrants came to resettle Judaea after the revolt left it largely depopulated.

=== Late Roman period ===
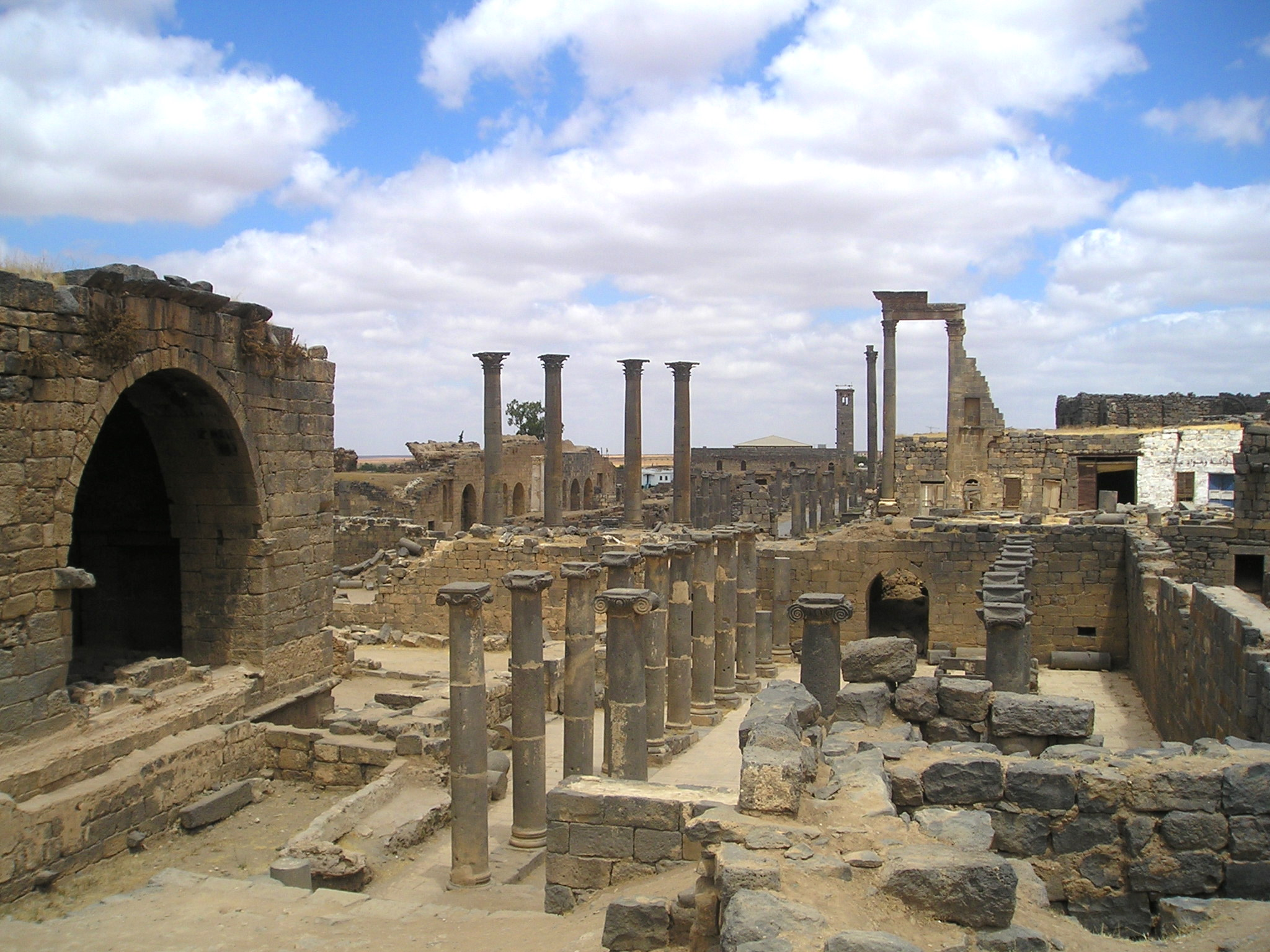
Bosra, an important centre of trade

Under Septimius Severus, Arabia Petraea was enlarged northward at the expense of the territory belonging to the province Syria, probably incorporating the Lajat and Jebel Druze (south of Damascus). This change formed part of a wider reorganization of the eastern provinces under Severus after a series of civil wars which saw Syria divided and neighboring provinces adjusted. The expansion also brought into Arabia the region associated with the later emperor Philip the Arab, who was born at Shahba in the Hauran. During the Diocletian Reforms around 300, the province was reduced again when the Negev, Sinai, and southern Transjordan were transferred to Palaestina.

=== Byzantine period ===
Around 357-358, Syria Palaestina was split in two; southern Palaestina, which included the recently added territories and later became known as Palaestina Salutaris, was separated from the remaining northern territory, which received the name Palaestina Prima.

== Greco-Roman influence ==
After the Roman annexation of the Nabataean kingdom in 106 CE, the new province of Arabia Petraea experienced a rapid, albeit uneven, process of Hellenization and provincial integration into the empire. While little is known about how the conquest was carried out, it was immediately followed by a decline of a "Nabataean" public ethnic identity in documents. A new provincial dating system was created, the Bostran era, whose first year began in 106 AD, the date of the creation of the new province, showing that local communities quickly adopted the chronology of Roman Arabia while still sometimes writing in Nabataean. Greek and Greek-style civic institutions became prominent within a few years of annexation.

The clearest evidence for the transition into a Greco-Roman cultural milieu comes from the Babatha archive, which shows that Nabataean and Aramaic documentary practices went from being written in Nabataean and Aramaic toward Greek legal and administrative forms. For example, datable documents from 94 and 99 are Nabataean, but a deed of deposit from 110 is in Greek and is dated according to the fifth Roman year of the province, citing a penalty payable to Caesar instead of a Nabataean king. Aramaic documents continued to be used into the early 120s, especially within a Jewish family context, but even these recognized Roman and provincial institutions through their dating formulae. From 124 to 132, the archive is largely Greek, with some Aramaic personal attestations and witness signatures, showing that Greek had become the normal language for many legal transactions, including some private ones.

This linguistic shift to Greek was accompanied by a reclassification of major communities as Greek-style cities. Petra appears in the Babatha archive as a metropolis with a council and the city had already received the title "metropolis" by 114 AD. The existence of a council implies the broader apparatus of Greek civic government, including annual magistrates, even though Nabataean and Aramaic signatures continued to appear alongside Greek proceedings. Other towns also acquired or displayed Greek civic status after the creation of the province: Bostra became "Nea Traiane Bostra" during the time of Trajan, Rabbathmoba was treated as a polis, and places such as Canatha, Adraa, Madaba, and later Charachmoba appear within the same landscape.

Hellenization in Arabia therefore was a matter of language, but also of public culture, civic status, coinage, festivals, and religious representation. Cities began to issue Greek coins in the second and third centuries AD, and Petra and Bostra came to be classified as Roman coloniae, furthering their incorporation into the civic structures of the Romans. Despite the growing Greco-Roman influence, local traditions could also persist in some contexts, such as coins in several cities (Adraa, Bostra, Charachmoba, and Madaba) that presented aniconic cult objects. Even these also shared in the standard anthropomorphic images of Graeco-Roman deities. Greek games and festivals also became part of urban public life, especially at Bostra, Gerasa, Scythopolis, and Philadelphia, though the evidence for such institutions is weaker in Petra and the southern former Nabataean zone.

Fergus Millar treats the term "Hellenization" with caution, arguing that "Graeco-Roman" is more accurate because Greek public culture developed together with Roman administration, Roman law, Latin names, and the presence of local army veterans. The deepest effects of this process may have occurred not in Petra itself, which seems to have remained a relatively modest provincial town after the monarchy, but in the villages of the Hauran and neighboring regions, where Greek inscriptions, public buildings, temples, local offices, and communal building projects became widespread. By the early fourth century, public Semitic-language inscriptions had largely disappeared in the northern and central settled zones, while Greek had become the dominant language of public expression in village communities. Nabataean did not disappear entirely and its survival was regionally uneven, with appearances continuing in peripheral areas beyond the center of Roman influence like the Sinai Peninsula and the Hejaz in the second to fourth centuries.

== List of episcopal sees ==
Ancient episcopal sees of the Roman province of Arabia listed in the Annuario Pontificio as titular sees:

- Adraa (Daraa)
- Bacatha in Arabia (ruins of Khirbet-El-Bascha?)
- Bosana (Syria) (Busan)
- Bostra, the Metropolitan Archbishopric
- Canatha
- Constantia in Arabia (Buraq)
- Chrysopolis in Arabia
- Dionysias
- Erra (Es-Sanamein?, Aere?, Ire?)
- Esbus (Hesbân)
- Eutyme
- Gerasa (now Jerash)
- Maximianopolis in Arabia
- Medaba (now Madaba)
- Neapolis in Arabia
- Neila (ruins of Khirbet-En-Nila)
- Neve
- Parembolae in Arabia
- Phaena (Al-Masmiyah)
- Philippopolis in Arabia (Shahba)
- Zorava (Ezra')

== See also ==
- Pre-Islamic Arabia
  - History of the Romans in Arabia
    - List of Roman governors of Arabia Petraea
- Religion in pre-Islamic Arabia

== Sources ==
- Bowersock, Glen Warren (1996). Roman Arabia (4. print ed.). Cambridge, Mass.: Harvard University Press. ISBN 9780674777552.
- Fiema, Zbigniew (2025). "Freedmen in Roman Hegra". In Repper, Rebecca; Bewley, Robert; Bishop, Mike (eds.). Reframing the "Desert Frontier": Studies in the Ancient Near East and Northern Arabia in Honour of David Kennedy. Sydney University Press. pp. 27–62.
- MacDonald, Burton (2025). "From survey to further research: Several sites of the Roman (Nabataean) period in southern Jordan". In Repper, Rebecca; Bewley, Robert; Bishop, Mike (eds.). Reframing the "Desert Frontier": Studies in the Ancient Near East and Northern Arabia in Honour of David Kennedy. Sydney University Press. pp. 213–238.
- Millar, Fergus (2001). The Roman near east, 31 BC - AD 337: based on Carl Newell Jackson lectures (4. print ed.). Cambridge, Mass.: Harvard University Press. ISBN 978-0674778856.
- Pogorelsky, Ofer (2025). "The Negev: An Historical Overview". In Sion, Ofer; Tepper, Yotam; Shemesh, Noy; Wiegmann, Alexander (eds.). The Negev Highland Settlements and Their Agricultural Hinterland in the Byzantine Period. TS Edizioni. pp. 11–29.
- Strobel, Karl (2025). "Divus Traianus Parthicus and the Near East". In Raja, Rubina (ed.). The Oxford Handbook of the Hellenistic and Roman Near East. Oxford University Press. pp. 325–338.
