= Legio III Cyrenaica =

Roman legion

Third Legion Cyrenaica
- Legio III Cyrenaica; Legio Tertia Cyrenaica
- Map of the Roman Empire in AD 125, under emperor Hadrian, showing the Third Legion Cyrenaica, stationed at Bostra (Busra, Syria), in Arabia Petraea province, from AD 125 until as late as the 5th century
- Active: 35(?) BC until as late as 430 AD
- Country: Roman Republic (closing years) and Roman Empire (nearly all existence)
- Type: Roman legion

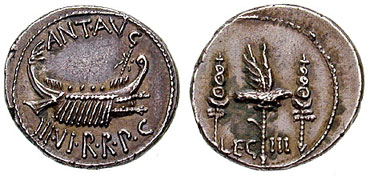
Denarius minted by Mark Antony to pay his legions. On the reverse, the aquila of his Third legion.

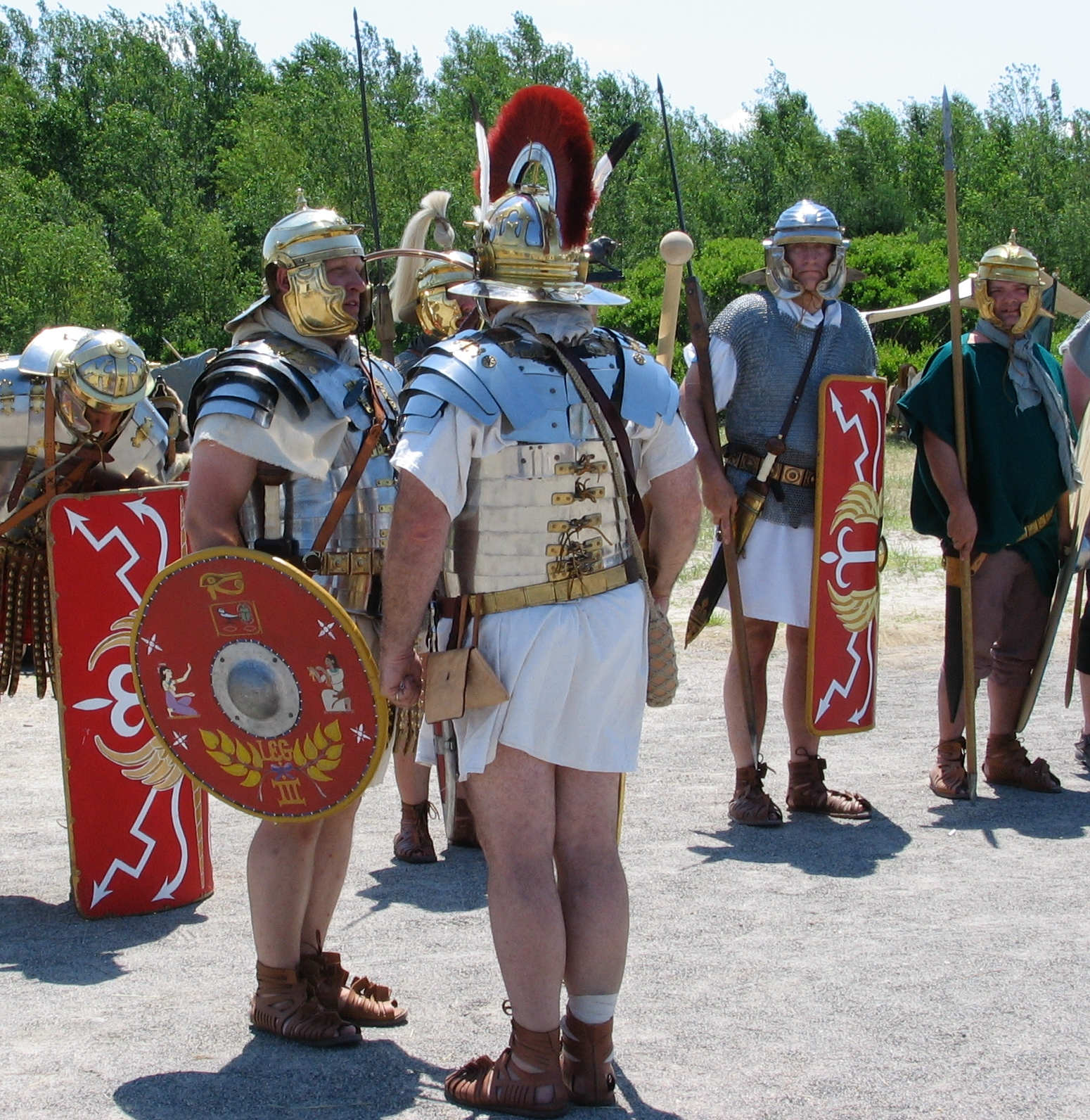
Roman re-enactors portraying Legio III Cyrenaica.

Legio III Cyrenaica, lit. Third Legion "Cyrenean", was a legion of the Imperial Roman army. The legion had its origins among the forces of Mark Antony during the civil wars of late first century BC. In the Imperial period it was stationed in Egypt, where it played a key role in campaigns against the Nubians and Jews. In the first century AD, it was usually located in Arabia Petraea. There are still records of the legion in Syria at the beginning of the 5th century. The legion symbol is unknown.

== History ==
=== Origins and service in Egypt ===
The origins of the legion are unclear, but it is first attested as part of Mark Antony's forces during the period of the Second Triumvirate (43-33 BC). Cyrenaica was under the control of Marcus Aemilius Lepidus before 36 BC and of Mark Antony after that date; either of them might have established the Legio III. Pollard and Berry suggest that the legion was established by Lucius Pinarius Scarpus, an ally of Mark Antony who was his governor of Cyrenaica in the 30s BC. The legio III is one of the many legions that appear in Mark Antony's Legionary denarii produced in 32-31 BC.

After Augustus defeated Antony at the Battle of Actium in 30 BC and annexed Egypt, he used the legion to occupy Thebes, the main centre in Upper Egypt. The soldiers of this legion are attested worshipping the Egyptian god Ammon. In either 7 AD or 9 AD the legion was transferred to Alexandria.

In 26-25 BC a vexillatio of III Cyrenaica took part in a disastrous Roman attack on Arabia Felix. The campaign was commanded Aelius Gallus, the prefect of Egypt. This caused the province of Egypt to be unprotected, as the legions were off fighting. Because of this the Nubian kingdom of Meroë attacked Upper Egypt. In 24 BC a Roman governor named Gaius Petronius took the legions, one of which was III Cyrenaica, and marched upstream along the Nile and reached Napata, the capital of Nubia. After this, the Nubians attacked the Romans a lot less.

=== Service beyond Egypt ===
On other occasions, vexillationes were sent abroad. It is possible that one of them was sent to Tongeren in Gallia Belgica during the reign of Caligula, which may have been part of the army he wanted to use to invade Britain in 40 AD. Another vexillatio took part Domitius Corbulo's campaign against the Parthian Empire in 63 AD. During the First Romano-Jewish war, the Third and Twenty-Second legions fought against the Jews of Alexandria.

In the civil war of the Year of the Four Emperors (69 AD), the III Cyrenaica were among the first supporters of the new emperor Vespasian. This could be because a subunit of the III Cyrenaica took part in the Siege of Jerusalem in 70 AD.

=== Second century AD ===
In 106 AD the legion was transferred to the province of Arabia Petraea. Its base was at Bosra. It subsequently returned to Egypt, perhaps in connection with the emperor Trajan's war against the Parthians, and/or the rebellion of the Jews of Alexandria in the Kitos War (115-117 AD). The legion returned to Arabia once more after 125 AD. Between 132 AD and 136 AD, subunits of this legion fought against the Jews in the Bar Kokhba revolt. During the reign of Antoninus Pius, they were stationed in Hegra in Arabia, but subunits fought in Mauretania against the Mauri. Later, subunits of the III Cyrenica took part in the Parthian War of Lucius Verus from 162 to 166 AD. In 175 AD, the legion sided with Avidius Cassius, a Roman general who revolted against Marcus Aurelius, but was killed by his own officers.

=== Later history ===
During the civil war following the death of the emperor Commodus in 192 AD the Legio III Cyrenaica sided with the eastern pretender Pescennius Niger. Niger was defeated by Septimius Severus. Subsequently, Severus invaded Mesopotamia to fight against the Parthians and it is possible that the Legio III took part in these campaigns. It certainly participated in the Parthian war launched by Severus' son Caracalla in 216 AD. The legion may also have taken part in Severus Alexander's war against the Sasanian Empire from 231 to 233 In 260 AD, the Sasanians took the Roman emperor Valerian captive, and several Roman provinces in the east became independent under Odaenathus of Palmyra. Odaenathus led Roman units against the Persians, one of which was the III Cyrenica. In 273 AD the legion helped build roads in Jordan. The later history of this unit is unclear, but the third Cyrenaican legion was still at Bostra at the beginning of the fifth century.

== Timeline ==
The following is a list of campaigns and actions thought to have been seen by Legion III Cyrenaica during much of its existence:

- 35(?) BC - Leg. III is formed, likely by Mark Antony or Lepidus in Cyrene. At this time, Legions still likely hold to the Republic tradition of being numbered in order of their creation, so this may have been the third Legion that [Anthony] had established and had under his direct command and loyalty.
- 31 BC – (Battle of Actium) – Either before or after Anthony and Cleopatra are defeated by Octavian (later Augustus), it is thought soldiers of Leg. III Cyrenaica defect from Anthony and claim allegiance to Octavian - who spares the Legion from being disbanded.
- 26 – 25 BC – Action in Arabia Felix (Yemen), commanded by Aelius Gallus, Prefect of Egypt.
- 23 BC – Action against Nubian invaders, Elements of III likely stationed in Thebes, Egypt.
- 23(?) BC (AD?) - Roman military presence in Egypt is reduced to 2 Legions: III Cyrenaica and XXII Deiotariana. Which other Legions, or how many there were, is not known.
- AD 7 – 11 – Suggested time period that the double-fortress at Nikopolis is established.
- AD 11 – Elements of Leg III under command of Publius Juventius Rufus, stationed in Berenike.
- AD 39 / 40 – A detachment (vexillation) of Leg III was sent up to the northern coast of Gaul (France) to assist Emperor Caligula's legions with his rather unimpressive invasion of Britain. III was apparently used as a logistics and supplies organizer for the invasion / landing force.
- AD 58 – 63 – Under the command of Gn. Domitius Corbulo, elements of III saw action in the Parthian frontier.
- AD 66 – 70 – The First Jewish–Roman War. An uprising of Jews starts in Alexandria, and spreads to Judea. Elements of III and XXII fought their way to Jerusalem, and with the assistance of several other legion, auxiliary and allied forces (around 60,000 troops) surrounded and besieged the city, led by Vespasian, Proconsul of Africa.
- AD 69 – "Year of the Four Emperors". Factions led by Galba, Otho, and then Vitellius all tried to seize control of Rome after the death of Nero. These factions, who had no aristocratic claim to the throne, (and hardly any support of the legions nor the Senate) all tried to take control one after another by force.
  - July 1 – With support of Gaius Licinius Mucianus, Governor of Syria and Tiberius Alexander, Prefect of Egypt, Vespasian is urged to revolt and take the throne. The legions in Alexandria, two days later those of Judea, and then in August those of Syria and the Danube region declare Vespasian Emperor. Vespasian sends Mucianus to march on Rome with 20,000 troops while Vespasian heads to Alexandria to control the grain supply and starve Rome into submission.
  - December 22 Vespasian is sworn in as emperor while still in Egypt.
- AD 70 – A vexillation of Leg III, along with X Fretensis, completes the siege of Jerusalem under the command of Vespasian's son, Titus.
- AD 84 – 88 – It is believed a detachment of Leg III is sent to help repair a footbridge along the Danube River, with legions VII Claudia, IV Flavia Felix, and either I or II Adiutrix. A stone engraving commemorating the bridge mentions "The Legion from Egypt". III appears to have been sent out abroad more often than XXII, so it is possible this is referring to III.
- AD 90 – Soldiers of III construct a bridge in Koptos (likely to improve or support roads to ports in Berenike and Quseir).
- AD 107 – 109 – Previously suggested date when Leg III departs Egypt - May instead be elements of III on expeditionary missions into Syria.
- AD 116 – Elements of III (or XXII?) are sent back to Judea to suppress another revolt, known as the Kitos War.
- AD 120 or 127 – III makes its departure from Egypt, being relocated to Bosra (aka Bostra, Syria / Jordan), where the capital was renamed from Petra to Nova Trajana Basra honoring Emperor Trajan. While in Bosra, Leg III constructs city gates, bridges and a massive amphitheater, which still exists today and is a popular tourist attraction. Meanwhile, Legion II Trajana Fortis replaces III in Egypt.
- AD 132 – 136 – Yet another Jewish war, the Bar Kokhba revolt. It is thought elements of III and XXII are sent to Judea. Legion XXII may have been destroyed during this war, or perhaps the earlier Kitos War.
- AD 162 – 166 – Elements of III again in Parthia, under command of Lucius Verus.
- AD 193 – Leg III supported Pescennius Niger in his failed attempt to take the throne after Emperor Commodus.
- AD 262 – 267 – It is possible that elements of III were involved with fighting Queen Zenobia in Palmyra (Syria).
- AD 420s or 430s – III is listed in the Notitia Dignitatum, a record of Roman military units and their stations. Legion III is listed as Praefectus legionis tertiae Cyrenaicae, Bostra.

== See also ==
- List of Roman legions

== Bibliography ==
- Johannes Kramer, "Die Wiener Liste von Soldaten der III. und XXII. Legion (P. Vindob. L 2)", Zeitschrift für Papyrologie und Epigraphik, 97 (1993), pp. 147–158
- G. W. Bowersock, "A Report on Arabia Provincia", Journal of Roman Studies, 61 (1971), pp. 219–242
- Karl Strobel, "Zu Fragen der frühen Geschichte der römischen Provinz Arabia und zu einigen Problemen der Legionsdislokation im Osten des Imperium Romanum zu Beginn des 2. Jh.N.Chr", Zeitschrift für Papyrologie und Epigraphik, 71 (1988), pp. 251–280
- John Peter Oleson, M. Barbara Reeves, Barbara J. Fisher, "New Dedicatory Inscriptions from Humayma (Ancient Hawara), Jordan", Zeitschrift für Papyrologie und Epigraphik, 140 (2002), pp. 103–121
- P.-L. Gatier, "La Legio III Cyrenaica et l'Arabie", in dans Les légions de Rome sous le Haut-Empire, I, Lyon, 2000, p. 341–344
- A. Kindler, The Coinage of Bostra (Warminster 1983) 87–95.
- D. Kennedy, "Legio VI Ferrata: The Annexation and Early Garrison of Arabia", Harvard Studies in Classical Philology, 84 (1980) 282–309
