= History of the Romans in Arabia =

The influence of ancient Rome in the Arabian Peninsula took root through extensive commerce between Arabs and Romans, who frequently traded with each other on the incense route and the spice route. The Romans knew of Arabia in three roughly divided regions: Arabia Petraea (lit. 'Rocky Arabia'), Arabia Deserta (lit. 'Deserted Arabia'), and Arabia Felix (lit. 'Fertile Arabia'). Collectively, they were a natural stop on the Roman trade route with India, especially by way of the Red Sea. While the Roman Republic had held territory in the Levant, it was not until the time of the Roman Empire that parts of Arabia proper came under Roman rule.

Arabia Petraea was a Roman province that was established after the Roman conquest of the Nabataean Kingdom in 106, consisting of the Sinai Peninsula and parts of the Southern Levant. Arabia Deserta referred to the uncontrolled and sparsely populated interior of the Arabian Peninsula, namely the vast Arabian Desert, which was inhabited by various Arab tribes. Arabia Felix, referring to South Arabia, was home to many independent Arab kingdoms, which variously traded with or fought wars against the Romans.

The Roman period in the Near East, including Arabia Petraea (later Palaestina Salutaris), continued until the early Muslim conquests, when these territories were conquered by the Rashidun Caliphate. Although Arab Muslim armies proceeded with several offensives against the Romans, they were unable to annex the rest of the Eastern Roman Empire, including Constantinople, and eventually reneged on their military campaigns due to internal political stability in the 11th century.

== Initial contacts ==
The volume of commerce between Rome and India via Red Sea and Arabian Sea was huge since the conquest of Egypt by the Romans in 30 BC, according to the historian Strabo: 120 Roman vessels sailed every year from Berenice Troglodytica and many times touched southern Arabia Felix on their travel to India, while doing the Spice Route. Mostly in order to secure the maritime route from piracy, the Romans organized an expedition under Aelius Gallus in which the port of Aden (then called Eudaemon) in southern Arabia was occupied temporarily. The Romans furthermore maintained a small legionary garrison in the Nabataean port of Leuke Kome (meaning "the white village", located north of the Arabian port of Jeddah) in the 1st century in order to control the commerce of spices, according to the academic Theodor Mommsen (see Indo-Roman trade relations).

Frankincense and myrrh, two spices highly prized in antiquity as fragrances, could only be obtained from trees growing in southern Arabia, Ethiopia, and Somalia. Arab merchants brought these goods to Roman markets by means of camel caravans along the Incense Route. This Incense Route originally commenced at Shabwah in Hadhramaut, the easternmost kingdom of South Arabia, and ended at Petra. Strabo compared the immense traffic along the desert routes to that of an army. The Incense Route ran along the western edge of Arabia's central desert about 100 miles inland from the Red Sea coast. The Roman Pliny the Elder stated that the journey consisted of sixty-five stages divided by halts for the camels. Both the Nabataeans and the South Arabians grew tremendously wealthy through the transport of these goods destined for the Roman Empire.

== Gallus' campaign in Arabia Felix ==
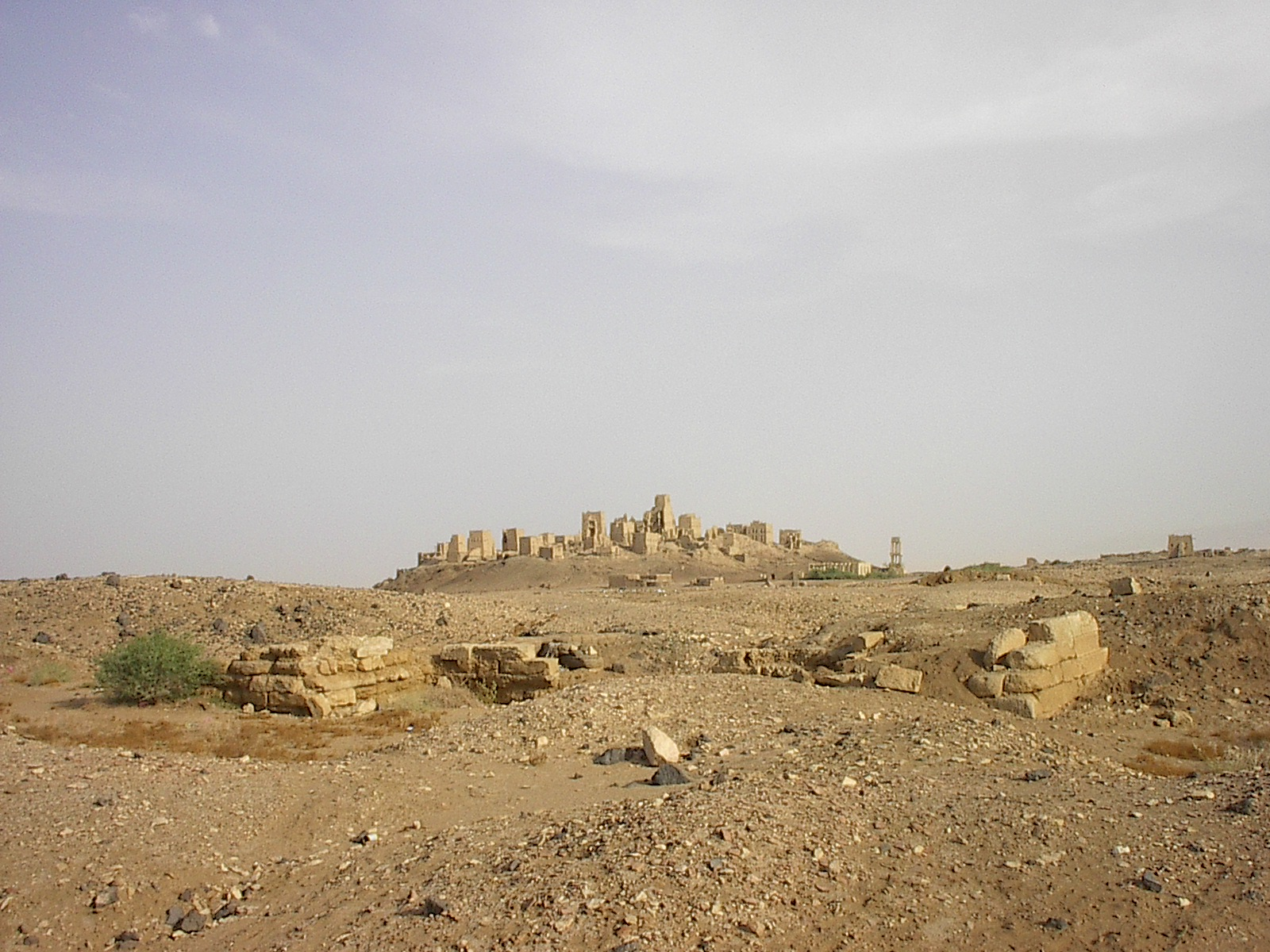
The ruins of Old Marib, Yemen, besieged by the Romans in 25 BC

Gaius Aelius Gallus was the second praefectus Aegypti (governor of Roman Egypt) (Latin: Aegyptus), from 26 to 24 BC. Accounts of his expedition to Arabia Felix are given by Strabo, Cassius Dio and Pliny the Elder. Strabo's account is particularly detailed, and derives most of its information from Aelius Gallus himself, who was a personal friend of Strabo.

Then part of the Kingdom of Saba, the area of modern-day Yemen was called Arabia Felix (Latin for 'Happy Arabia' / 'Fortunate Arabia') by the Romans, reflecting its perceived prosperity. The success of the Sabaeans was based on their cultivation and trade of valuable spices and aromatics, including frankincense and myrrh. Irrigation of these crops was enabled by the Great Dam of Ma'rib. Strabo mentions that Ilasaros was the ruler of Hadhramaut at that time.

Augustus commanded Gallus to undertake a military expedition to Arabia Felix in 26 BC, where he was to either conclude treaties making the Arabian people foederati (i.e., client states), or to subdue them if they resisted. According to Theodor Mommsen, Aelius Gallus sailed with 10,000 legionaries from Egypt and landed at Leuce Kome, a trading port of the Nabateans in the northwestern Arabian coast. Gallus' subsequent movements relied on a Nabataean guide called Syllaeus, who proved to be untrustworthy. As a result of Syllaeus' misdirections, the army took six months to reach Ma'rib, the Sabaean capital.

Gallus besieged Ma'rib unsuccessfully for a week, before being forced to withdraw. Mommsen ascribes this to a combination of disease, over-extended supply lines, and a tougher desert environment than the Romans had expected. Gallus' retreat to Alexandria was completed in sixty days. The supporting Roman fleet had more success: they occupied and destroyed the port of Eudaemon (modern Aden), securing the Roman merchant route to India.

== Trajan and the Arabia Petraea province ==
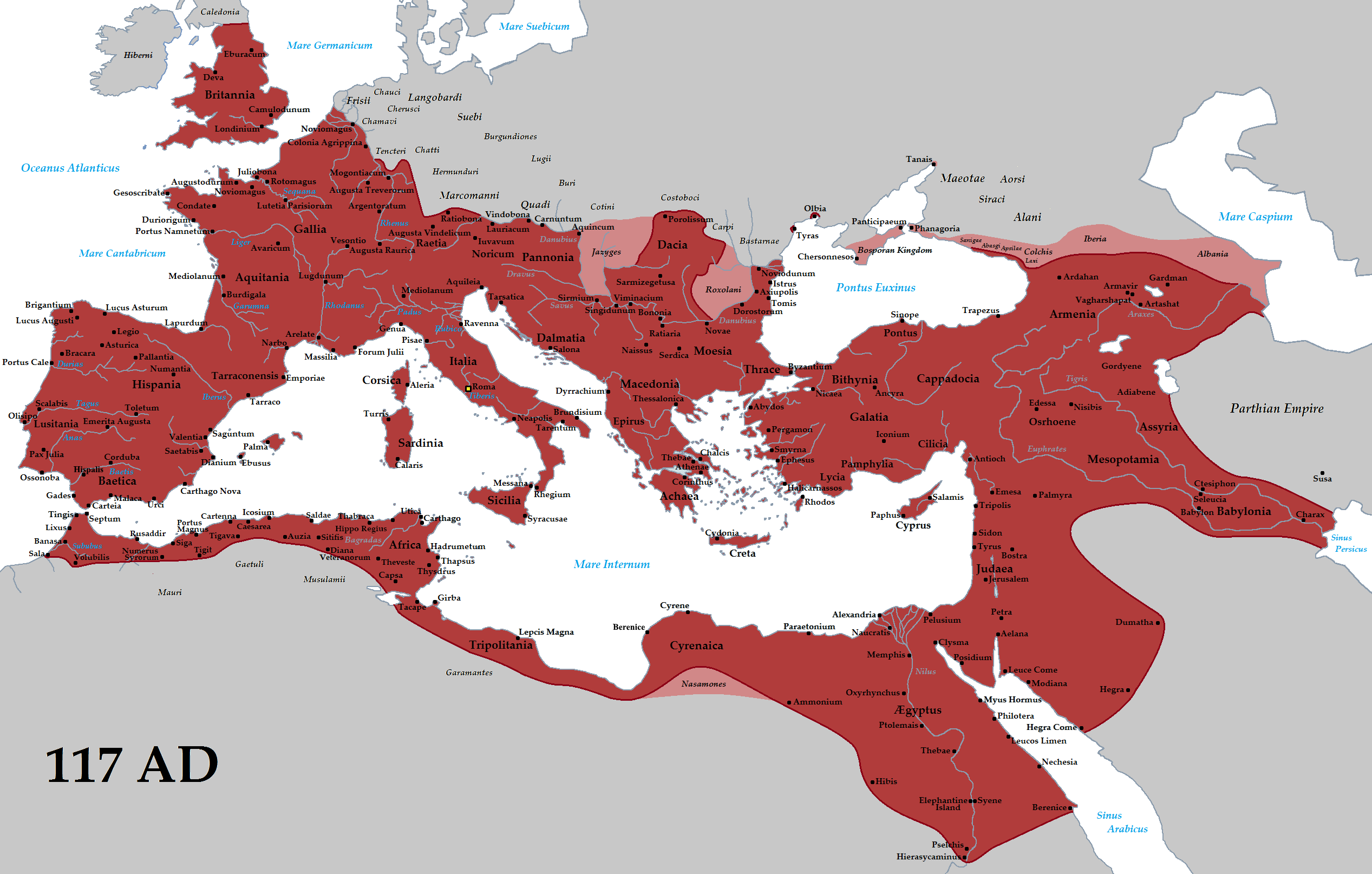
A map of the Roman Empire shortly after Trajan's conquests of the kingdom of Nabataea, including Hegra in the interior. The province was soon reduced back to the line of limes Arabicus.

The Nabateans maintained close relations with the Romans since their arrival in the southeastern Mediterranean area. Under Augustus they were a Roman client kingdom.

When the emperor Trajan started his military expansions toward the east Rabbel II Soter, one of Rome's client kings, died. This event prompted the annexation of the Nabataean Kingdom, although the manner and the formal reasons for the annexation are unclear. Some epigraphic evidence suggests a military operation, with forces from Syria and Egypt. What is clear, however, is that by 107, Roman legions were stationed in the area around Petra and Bostra, as is shown by a papyrus (and other evidence) found in Egypt.

The Roman Empire gained what became the province of Arabia Petraea (modern southern Jordan and northwest Saudi Arabia).

The Hedjaz region was integrated into the Roman province of Arabia in 106 CE. A monumental Roman epigraph of 175-177 was recently discovered at Al-Hijr (then called Hegra). The region then formed part of Roman history, and then Byzantine history, until the 7th century. In 356, the city of Hegra is again mentioned, as being led by a mayor of local origin, but it seems to have been very little [...]

The conquest of Arabia was not officially exulted until the completion of the Via Traiana Nova in 120s. This road extended down the center of the province from Bostra to Aqaba. It was not until the project was finished that coins, featuring Trajan's bust on the obverse and a camel on the reverse, appeared commemorating the acquisition of Arabia. These coins were minted until 115, at which time the Roman imperial focus was turning farther eastward. The road links not only Bostra and Aqaba, but also Petra, and was continued by a "caravan road" south the coast of western Arabia until the port of Leuce Kome.

In 1965, further evidence was discovered that Roman legions occupied Mada'in Saleh in the Hijaz Mountains area of northwestern Arabia, increasing the extension of the Arabia Petraea province. Particularly interested in the East, Trajan secured Indian Ocean trade by establishing a garrison on tropical Farasan island, in the south of that sea.

Hadrian probably restructured the province after the Trajan expansion, reducing the area to nearly half the original size (at the west of what was called the Limes Arabicus) in order to better defend Arabia Petraea from raiders and enemies.

Under emperor Septimius Severus Arabia Petraea was expanded to include the Leja' and Jabal al-Druze, rough terrain south of Damascus, and also the birthplace of M. Julius Phillipus (Philip the Arab).

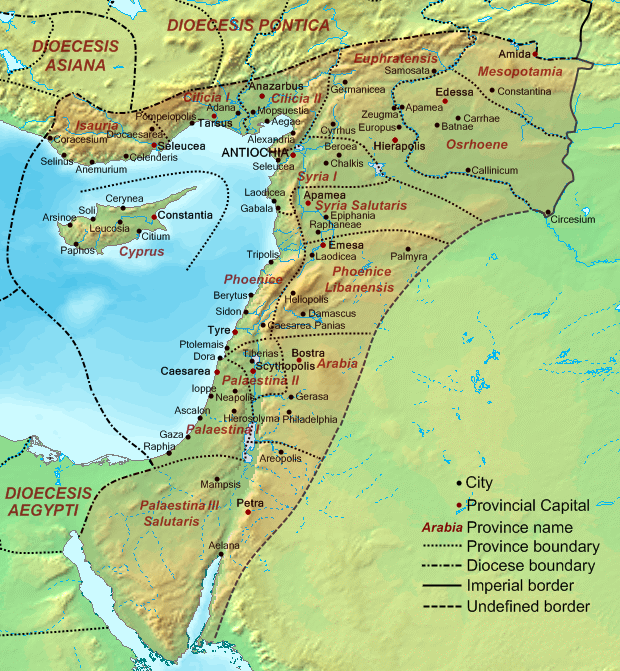
Roman Arabia in the "Diocese of the East" (Dioecesis Orientis) at the beginning of the 5th century

Indeed, the Romans found a powerful ally in the Arabs called Ghassanids, who moved from the area of Marib to southern Syria, mainly in the 2nd century. The Ghassanids were the buffer zone against the other Bedouins penetrating Roman territory in those years. More accurately their kings can be described as phylarchs, native rulers of subject frontier states. Their capital was at Jabiyah in the Golan Heights. Geographically, the Ghassanid kingdom occupied much of Syria, Mount Hermon (Lebanon), Jordan and Palestine, and its authority extended via tribal alliances with other "Azdi" tribes all the way to the northern Hejaz as far south as Yathrib (Medina).

Furthermore, precise Arab ancestry of the Roman emperor Philip the Arab is not known, since all sources give only the Latin names of him and his family members. However, having originated from the general area in which the Ghassanids settled, many historians consider he may have been of that origin. His being mentioned either as a Christian himself or at least tolerant of Christians would fit with his originating from a people which was in the process of Christianization at the time of his rule.

Septimius Severus enlarged a province that was already huge. He then proceeded to enlarge the empire, through the conquest of Mesopotamia. The transfer of the Leja' and Jebel Drūz seemed to have been part of a shrewd series of political acts on the emperor's part to consolidate control of the area before this conquest. Arabia became the ideological power-base for Septimius Severus in the Roman Near East.

Arabia became such a symbol of loyalty to Severus and the empire, according to Bowersock, that during his war against Clodius Albinus, in Gaul, Syrian opponents propagated a rumour that the Third Cyrenaica legion controlling Arabia Petraea had defected. That it would matter to an issue in Gaul that a single legion in a backwater province on the other side of the empire would rebel indicates the political sway that Arabia had amassed. Not a land of significant population, resources, or even strategic position, it had become a bedrock of Roman culture. That it was an Eastern Roman culture did not seem to dilute its effectiveness in matters in the west. It is precisely because Arabia Petraea had so little that it was able to define itself as Roman and that spurred its loyalty to Imperial Rome.

Another example of the loyalty to Rome of the Arab tribes of northern Arabia was Lucius Septimius Odaenathus. He was "the son of Lucius Septimius Herod (Hairān), the senator and chief of Tadmor, the son of Vaballathus (Wahballath), the son of Nasor" and was the romanized Arab ruler of Palmyra and later his wife Zenobia and son Vaballathus ruled the short-lived Palmyrene Empire. Odaenathus, in the second half of the 3rd century, succeeded in recovering the Roman East from the Sassanids and restoring it to the Empire.

With Emperor Diocletian's restructuring of the empire in 284–305, Arabia Petraea province was enlarged to include parts of modern-day Palestine. Arabia after Diocletian was a part of the Diocese of the East, which was part of the Praetorian prefecture of the East and was largely Christian.

The province was conquered by the Arab Muslims under the Caliph Umar in the early 7th century: the Legio III Cyrenaica was destroyed defending Bostra in 630, ending the Roman presence in Arabia.

== See also ==
- Pre-Islamic Arabia
- Legacy of the Roman Empire
- Greco-Roman period

== Bibliography ==
- Bowersock, G. Roman Arabia Harvard University Press. Harvard, 1983
- Fisher, G. Rome, Persia, and Arabia. Shaping the Middle East from Pompey to Muhammad. Routledge, 2020. ISBN 9780415728812
- De Maigret, Alessandro. Arabia Felix. Stacey International. London, 2002. ISBN 1-900988-07-0
- Miller, James Innes (1969). The Spice Trade of the Roman Empire. Oxford: Oxford University Press. ISBN 978-0-19-814264-5.
- Mommsen, Theodor. Römische Geschichte 8 Volumes. dtv, München 2001. ISBN 3-423-59055-6
- O'Leary, De Lacy (2001). Arabia Before Muhammad. London: Routledge. ISBN 0-415-23188-4.
- Von Wissmann, H. "Die Geschichte des Säbaerreichs und der Felzug des Æelius Gallus". Haase ed. Munchen, 1976
- Young, Gary Keith. Rome's Eastern Trade: International Commerce and Imperial Policy, 31 BC-AD 305. Routledge. London, 2001 ISBN 0-415-24219-3
