= Thumata =

Ancient Arabian town

Thumata (Greek: Θουμάτα, Thoumata), or Thamatha, was a town of classical antiquity.

== History ==
According to Ptolemy, Thumata was a town of Arabia Felix, but Pliny puts it on the Tigris. According to Pliny, it was a distant ten days' sail from Petra, and subject to the king of the Characeni.

== Sources ==
- Dyer, Thomas H. (1857). "Thumata". In Smith, William (ed.). Dictionary of Greek and Roman Geography. Vol. 2: Iabadius–Zymethus. London: Walton and Maberly. p. 1191.
