= White village =

White village may refer to:

- Leuke Kome, (lit. "White Village" in Greek), former Nabataean port city in Saudi Arabia
- White Towns of Andalusia, a series of towns in Spain.

== See also ==
- Racial segregation
