= Legionary coinage of Mark Antony =

32–31 BC Roman coinage

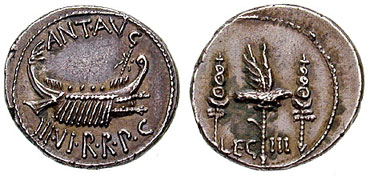
RRC 544/14: Legionary denarius, issued in the name of Mark Antony and the Legio III Cyrenaica

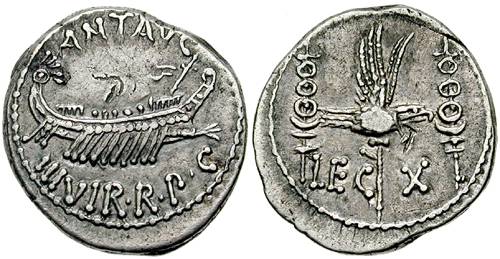
RRC 544/24: Legionary denarius, issued in the name of Mark Antony and the Legio X Equestris

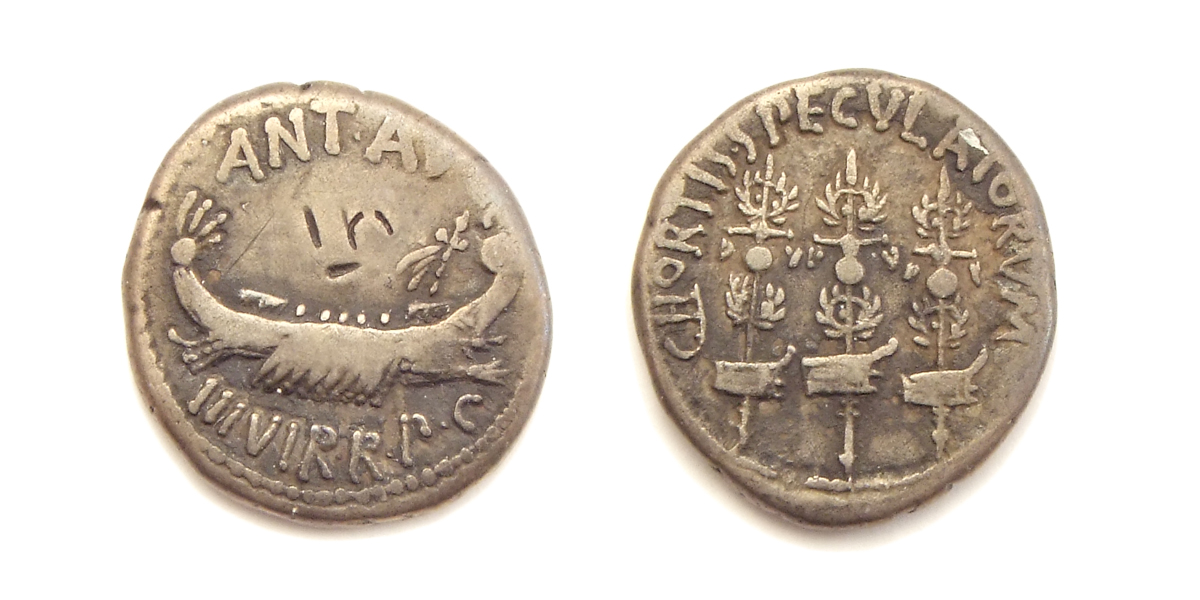
RRC 544/12: Variant legionary denarius, issued in the name of Mark Antony and the cohort of scouts (cohors speculatorum)

The Legionary coinage of Mark Antony is the modern name for a series of coins issued by Mark Antony in the eastern Mediterranean during the last war of the Roman Republic from 32 to 31 BC, in the lead up to the Battle of Actium. This very large issue comprised mostly silver denarii and a few gold aurei, which were used to pay the wages of Mark Antony's legions. The coinage is also referred to by numismatists as RRC 544/1-39, after its designation in M. H. Crawford, Roman Republican Coinage (1975).

== Description ==
The coinage is very large, with 39 distinct issues. The obverse of all issues shows a galley with an ornamental prow (called an aplustre) and a mast that slants forward over the bow (called a dolon-mast). The legend reads ANT AVG III VIR R P C, an abbreviation of Antonii auguris, tresviri rei publicae constituendae ("[coin of]" Antony, augur and one of the Triumvirs for organising the Republic).

On most issues, the reverse shows an aquila, the eagle-standard carried by each legion, between two other military standards. The reverse legend reads LEG (legionis, "of the legion"), plus a number (I-XXIII), identifying a specific legion within Antony's forces. A variant issue (RRC 544/12) has the same obverse design, but a different reverse design, showing three naval standards and the legend CHORTIS SPECVLATORVM ("[coin] of the cohort of scouts").

The coins weight about 3.9 grammes, which is the normal weight for a denarius coin. Their silver content is 92.2%, the same as the cistophorus (the main coinage in the province of Asia), but lower than contemporary denarii struck at Rome, which had a silver content of 96.84%.

== Significance ==
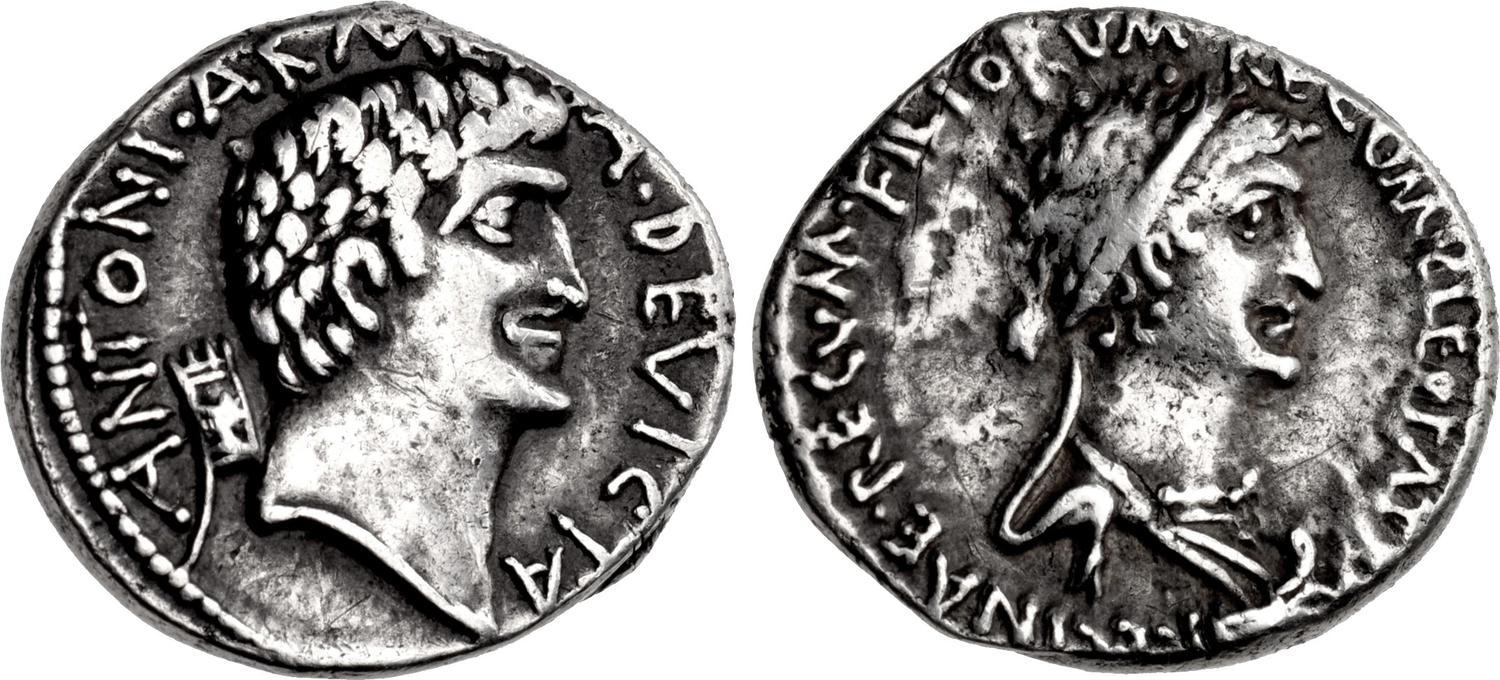
Coin of Mark Antony (RRC 543/1, 34 BC), depicting Mark Antony on the obverse and Cleopatra on the reverse.

The coins provide evidence for the way Mark Antony represented himself and his position in the lead up to his conflict with Octavian (the future Augustus). This is particularly important since most of the surviving literary evidence was written after Octavian's victory and perpetuates his representation of Antony. The absence of Mark Antony's portrait from coinage is a substantial departure from the previous period, when his coinage regularly depicted him and his partner Cleopatra (e.g. RRC 543/1 of 34 BC, depicted at right). Clare Rowan suggests that this was a conscious decision, intended to counter Octavian's claims that Antony had come "under the spell" of Cleopatra and was working in her interests rather than those of Rome. The coinage thus avoided reference to Cleopatra and emphasised Antony's role as a Roman commander. A claim to legal legitimacy was advanced by the obverse legend's reference to Antony as one of the triumvirs. In fact, Antony's triumviral position had expired in 34 BC, the year before he began to mint the legionary denarii. Additionally, the image of the ship on the obverse and the vast number of legions represented on the reverse emphasised the scale and Roman-ness of his military power.

Although the reverse of each issue identifies a specific legion, they were probably paid out to the soldiers at random, rather than being used only to pay the legion named on them, since the different reverse types are often found together in coin hoards. A hoard found at Actium (known as RRCH 473), which was probably buried by a legionary in Antony's army, includes legionary coins naming almost all the different legions under Antony's command.

== Circulation ==
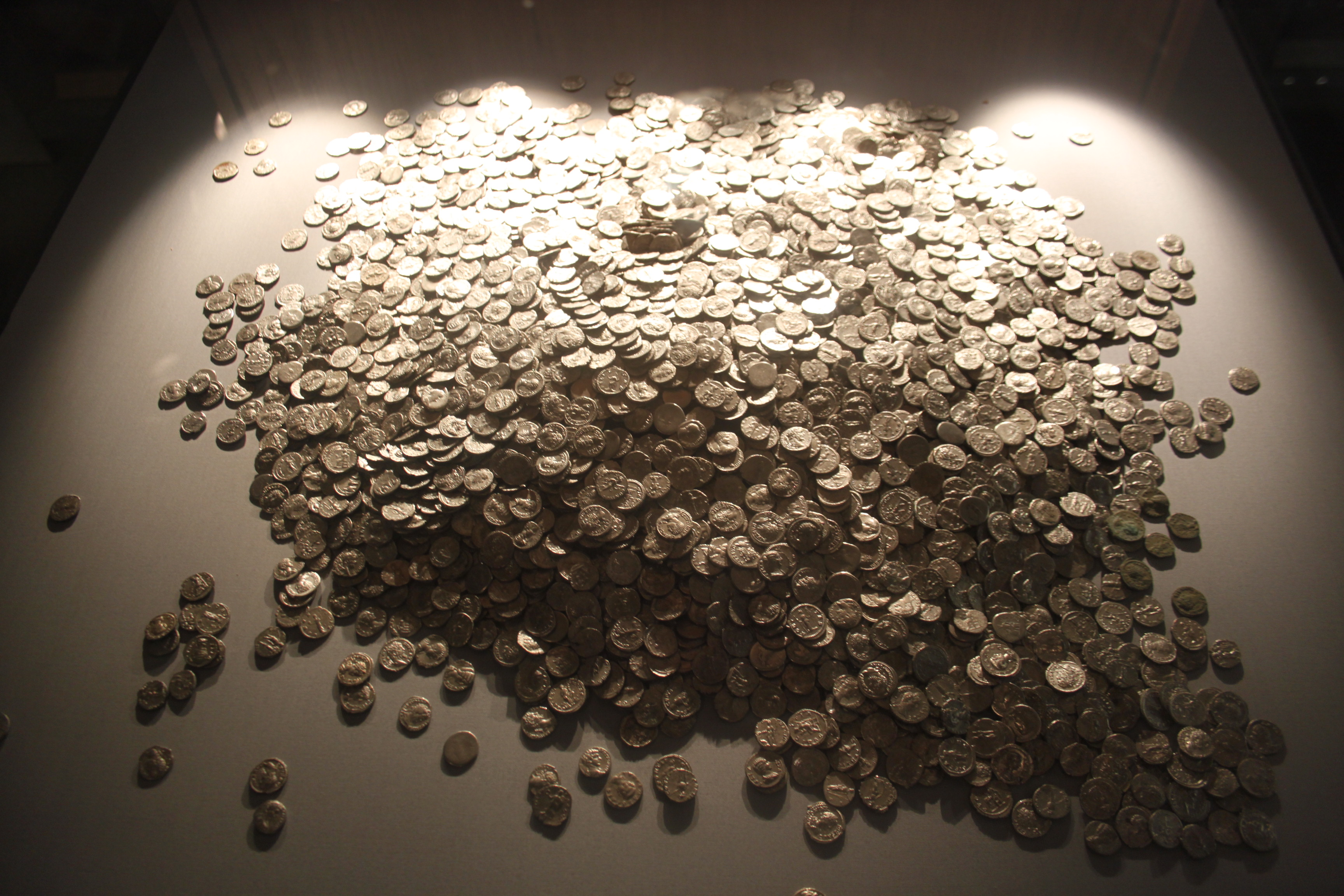
The Shapwick Hoard.

The legionary denarii were the largest issue of silver coinage produced in the late Republican period. They support the claim of the third-century AD Roman historian, Cassius Dio (Roman History 50.18.2), that Mark Antony was better funded than Octavian in the lead-up to the Battle of Actium. It is probable that Octavian used the legionary denarii to pay his own soldiers after his victory at the Battle of Actium. In hoards from the late first century BC in the eastern Mediterranean, the legionary denarii are much more frequently found than coins of Octavian, even in areas which were settled by his veterans. Melting the coinage down and re-striking it would have been expensive and time-consuming. Moreover, the lower silver content of Antony's denarii compared to Octavian's own meant that if he had re-struck the coinage, he would have ended up with fewer coins.

Hoard evidence shows that the legionary denarii continued to form a large part of the coinage in circulation in the Roman Imperial period. Their relatively low silver content meant that the Imperial government did not make an effort to recall and remint them, as they did for other Republican and early Imperial coin issues. It also meant that they were not removed from circulation by the operation of Gresham's law. In the reign of Vespasian (AD 69–79), legionary denarii still made up around a fifth of all denarii in circulation in Greece. Highly worn examples continue to appear frequently in hoards into the third century AD.

The denarii percolated through the rest of the empire slowly. Their peak of circulation in northern Gaul and Germania comes in the mid-first century AD. They formed a major component of the coinage circulating in Britannia immediately after the Roman conquest in AD 43. The Shapwick Hoard, which was deposited in Roman Britain some time after AD 224 contained 260 legionary denarii (3% of the total). The next earliest coins in that hoard were produced under Nero (AD 54–69).

The flood of legionary denarii probably also played a role in the end of local minting of silver coinage in Greece and the Aegean, which had continued throughout the first century BC, but after the Battle of Actium communities only minted bronze coinage (known as provincial coinage). John H. Kroll and Clare Rowan suggest that the quantity of silver put into circulation as legionary denarii meant that local communities no longer had any need to mint their own.

== See also ==
- Roman Republican currency

== Bibliography ==
- Abdy, R.; Minnitt, S. (2002). "Shapwick Villa". Coin Hoards from Roman Britain. 11: 169–233.
- Dillon, J. N. (2007). "Octavian's Finances after Actium, before Egypt: The CAESAR DIVI F / IMP CAESAR coinage and Antony's Legionary Issue". Chiron. 37: 35–48.
- Kemmers, Fleur (2006). Coins for a legion : an analysis of the coin finds from the Augustan legionary fortress and Flavian canabae legionis at Nijmegen. Mainz am Rhein: Verlag Philipp von Zabern. ISBN 9783805337304.
- Kroll, J. H. (1997). "Coinage as an Index of Romanization". In Hoff, M. C.; Rotroff, S. I. (eds.). The Romanization of Athens. Oxford: Oxbow Books. pp. 135–150.
- Lockyear, K. (2007). Patterns and Process in Late Republican Coin Hoards. Oxford: Archaeopress, BAR International Series.
- Rowan, Clare (2019). From Caesar to Augustus (c. 49 BC–AD 14) : using coins as sources. Cambridge, United Kingdom: Cambridge University Press. pp. 109–116. ISBN 9781107675698.
- Woytek, B. (2012). Metcalf, W. E. (ed.). The Oxford Handbook of Greek and Roman Coinage. Oxford: Oxford University Press. pp. 315–344.
- Woytek, B. (2007). "Die Münzen der römischen Republik und der Übergangszeit zum Prinzipat im Museum Canuntinum (mit einem Exkurs zu den den Legionsprägungen des Marcus Antonius)". In Alram, M; Schmidt-Dick, F. (eds.). Die Fundmünzen der römischen Zeit im Österreich Abteilung III: Niederösterreich, Band 2: Die antiken Fundmünzen im Museum Carnuntinum. Vienna: Verlag der Österreichischen Akademie der Wissenschaften. pp. 503–518.
