= Arabia Deserta =

Roman name for the desert interior of the Arabian peninsula

Coordinates: 32°26′N 36°19′E

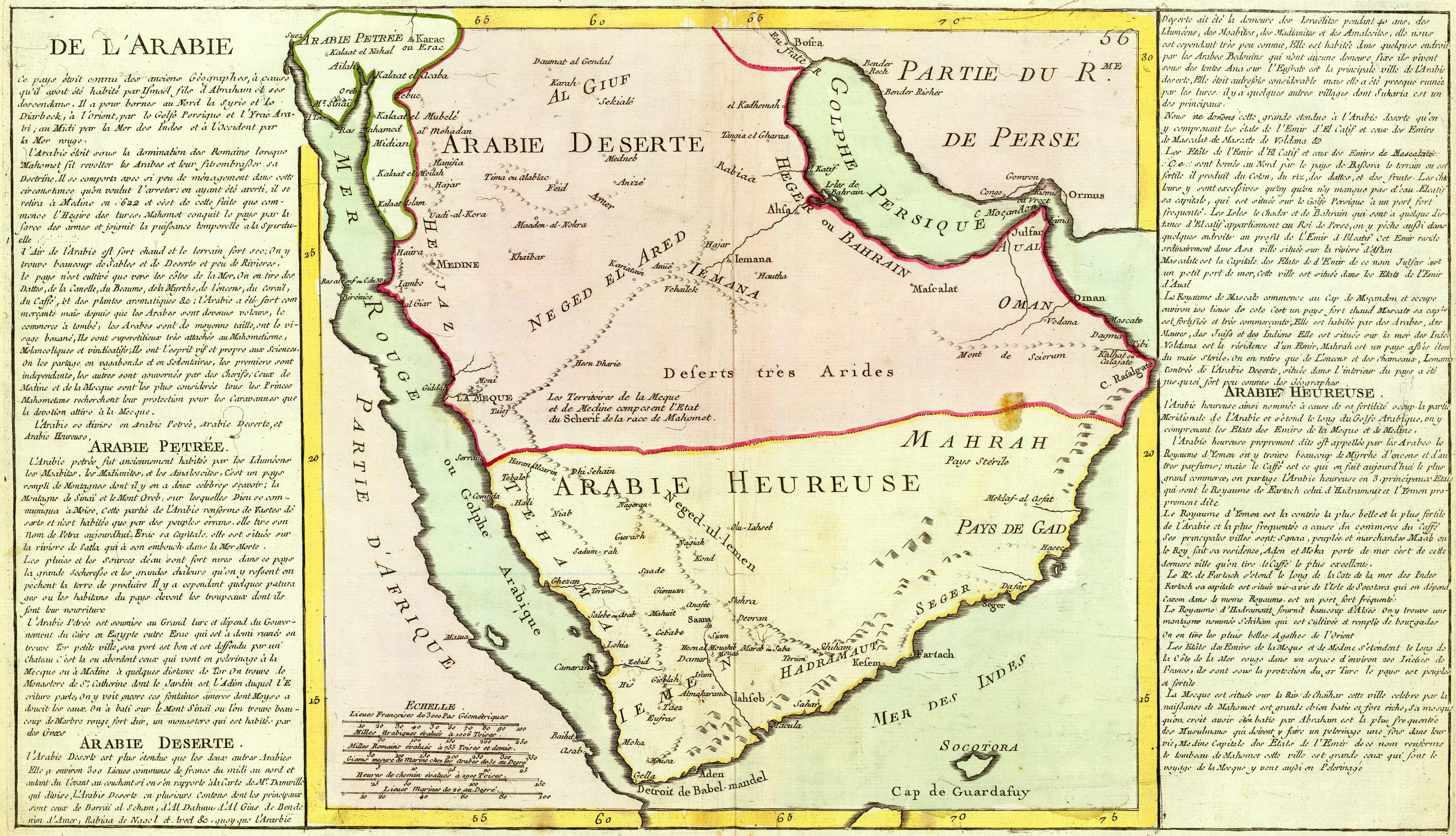
A 1787 French map of the three Arabias by Clouet, J. B. L. (Jean-Baptiste Louis).

Arabia Deserta (Latin for lit. 'Deserted Arabia'), also known as Arabia Magna (lit. 'Great Arabia'), signified the desert interior of the Arabian Peninsula, delineated to the northeast by the Euphrates. During ancient history, this land was populated by nomadic Bedouin tribes.

Arabia Deserta was one of three regions into which the Romans divided the Arabian peninsula: Arabia Deserta (or Arabia Magna), Arabia Felix, and Arabia Petraea. As a name for the region, it remained popular into the 19th and 20th centuries, and was used in Charles M. Doughty's Travels in Arabia Deserta (1888).

== Bibliography ==
- G.W. Bowersock, "The three Arabias in Ptolemy's geography" and "Arabs and Saracens in the Historia Augusta" in G.W. Bowersock, Studies on the Eastern Roman Empire, Goldbach, 1994.
- F. Millar, The Roman Near East, London, 1994, pp. 514 ff.
