= Aynuna =

Aynuna (Arab. عينونة, ʿAynūna) – a village in northwestern Saudi Arabia, in the Tabuk Region, located about 5 km from the Red Sea coast, at the mouth of the Gulf of Aqaba. Archaeological remains discovered here are identified by most researchers with the Nabataean port of Leuke Kome, mentioned by Strabo, among others. It lay on a trade route; it is estimated that about 8-9 days were needed for a camel caravan to travel from Aqaba to Petra. The 300-km-long track led through the mountains but was fairly easy and safe.

== Archaeological research ==
=== Saudi–Polish Archaeological Project in Aynuna ===
The archaeological expedition from the Polish Centre of Mediterranean Archaeology University of Warsaw (PCMA UW) and the Saudi Commission for Tourism and National Heritage (SCTA) has conducted research in Aynuna since 2014, under the direction of Prof. Michał Gawlikowski (PCMA UW) and Dr. Abdullah al-Zahrani. The site lies on the bank of a dried-up riverbed of the same name (Wadi Aynuna/Wadi Ainounah). The excavations focus on a complex of buildings of a trading post, which are dated from the Roman period (1st century AD) to the early Islamic times (8th century). A survey carried out on the plateau cut by Wadi Aynuna also revealed the remains of a fortified settlement. A modern fishing village of Khoraiba covers the site of the ancient port. Although it lay about 3 km from the trading post studied by the expedition, both places were undoubtedly connected.
