= Ridge Church =

Ruined church in Petra, Jordan

The Ridge Church is one of several churches in the ruined city of Petra, Jordan. The Ridge Church is thought to be the oldest church building in Petra, built on the ridge overlooking the city in the 3rd or 4th century built of Nabatean and Roman material. It was a square structure with two rows of pillars running down the middle of the church building which supported the roof and was built over two separate family tomb chambers. The relationship between the church and tombs is unknown. A semi circular sanctuary was built at the end of the main chamber. The church also included a small building with a fountain. This building, with a greek inscription dated to the 4th or 5th centuries, indicated the fountain was built to honor a figure from a prominent military background.

The Ridge Church was excavated as the first phase of the North Ridge Project. Over the course of excavations, the north ridge was discovered to have likely used by the military and also as a burial ground. The Ridge Church is located across a central piazza from the Blue Chapel. The Ridge Church shows evidence of activity following the earthquake that devastated the area in 363 CE. The first evidence of activity following the quake was the building of the north wall of the church and the conversion of the church into a single apse with two lateral pastophoria. Evidence for the date of this conversion comes from the opening of a tomb in the church that was then looted and resealed for the construction of the north wall. Later additions to the building involved raising the chancel and installing a mosaic near the altar. Little remains of a 6th-century installation of wall mosaics.

== See also ==
- Byzantine Church (Petra)
