= Petra papyri =

Documents in Greek from the sixth century AD

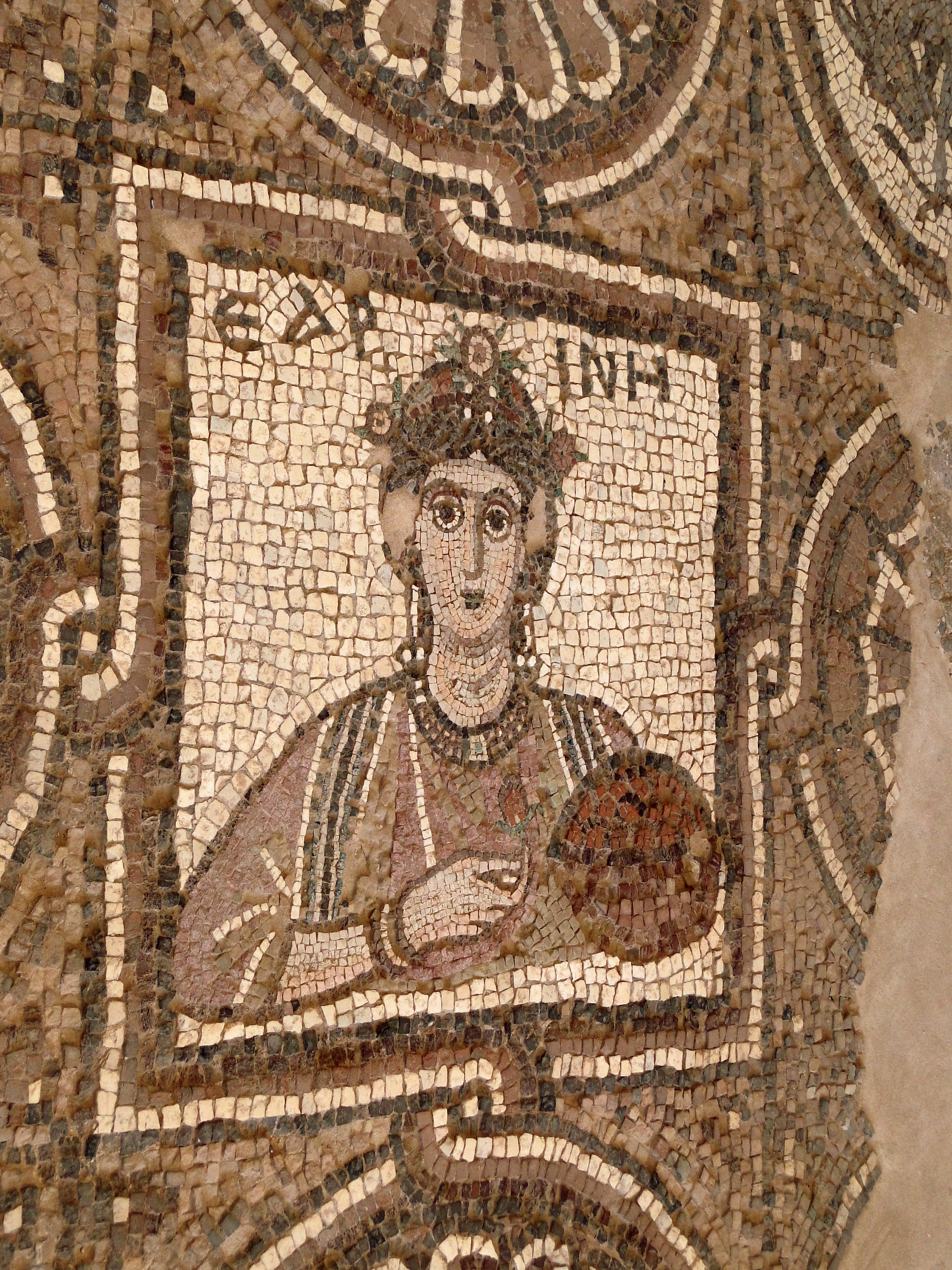
Mosaic of woman from the floor of the Petra Church, where the Petra papyri were found

The Petra papyri, also known as the Petra archive, is a corpus of papyrus documents written in Ancient Greek and dating to the 6th century AD that were discovered in the Byzantine Church at Petra in 1993. At some 140 papyrus rolls, the collection constitutes the largest corpus of ancient documents ever found in Jordan and stand as one of the most important papyrological finds outside of the massive yields taken from the sands of Egypt. Like the Herculaneum papyri, another major non-Egyptian find, the Petra rolls were preserved by virtue of their being carbonized in a fire, but most of the papyri were damaged beyond decipherment and only a few dozen preserve substantial, interpretable texts.

The corpus is an "archive" in that it contains the private papers of a single family. The man at the center of this seemingly well-to-do household was one Theodoros who served as deacon at the Petra church, but his relation to many of the other people named in the papyri is often unclear. The family is most likely made up of wealthy landowners of both residential and agricultural lands, despite the slow decline in Petra's economy at the time. One, Gessius, was a famous physician in Egypt. The documents in the archive of his family concern private matters like marriages, inheritances and sales, as well as public legal matters, including property disputes and the evolution of systems of tax records through successive political regimes (Byzantine, Roman, and Arab). Theodoros likely owned land spanning Wadi Araba and Gaza, where he lived for a brief time. In addition to providing a rare glimpse into the affairs of an otherwise anonymous family over several generations, the Petra papyri offer evidence of the relations of a large group of the region's upper class, with approximately 350 individuals from outside the family being named in their personal and legal documents. The papyri present evidence of the honoring of the wealthy by the Byzantine regime, and the use of specific honorific titles to demarcate them. This kind of honoring occurred well into the Romanization of the city of Petra and the transfer of political power.

The papyri are published in an eponymous series, The Petra Papyri (abbreviated P.Petra), which are prepared by teams of scholars from the universities of Helsinki and Michigan and published by the American Center of Oriental Research. Volumes I, III and IV, comprising some forty-nine documents, have been published to date. P.Petra II was published last in 2013.

Some suggest that though the papyri was written in Greek, often there was content that was written in Greek letters, but phonetically representing content in a pre-Islamic dialect of Arabic.

== Works cited ==
- Arjava, A.; Buchholz, M.; Gagos, T. (2007), The Petra Papyri III, Amman, ISBN 978-9957-8543-2-4.
- Arjava, A.; Buchholz, M.; Gagos, T.; Kaimio, M. (2011), The Petra Papyri IV, Amman, ISBN 978-9957-8543-5-5.
- Frösén, J.; Arjava, A.; Lehtinen, M. (2002), The Petra Papyri I, Amman
- Hickey, T. (2004), "The Petra Papyri I (review)", Bulletin of the American Schools of Oriental Research, 334: 92–4, doi:10.2307/4150117, JSTOR 4150117.
- Gonis, N. (2005), "Papyri from Petra", Classical Review, 55 (2): 655–7, doi:10.1093/clrevj/bni357, JSTOR 3873919.
