= Aelius Gallus =

1st-century BC Roman governor and general

Gaius Aelius Gallus

Prefect of Egypt
- In office 26 BC – 24 BC
- Preceded by: Cornelius Gallus
- Succeeded by: Petronius

Personal details
- Known for: disastrous expedition

Gaius Aelius Gallus was a Roman prefect of Egypt from 26 to 24 BC. He is primarily known for a disastrous expedition he undertook to Arabia Felix (modern day Yemen) under orders of Augustus.

== Life ==
Aelius Gallus was the 2nd praefect of Roman Egypt (Aegyptus) in the reign of Augustus during the years 26–24 BC. He replaced Cornelius Gallus, with whom he has often been confused.

Aelius Gallus was also known to be an intimate friend of the Greek geographer Strabo and has been identified as the Aelius Gallus frequently quoted by Galen, whose remedies are stated to have been used with success in his Arabian expedition.

The expedition to Arabia Felix, of which an account is given by his friend Strabo, as well as by Cassius Dio and Pliny the Elder turned out to be a complete failure. In this expedition, Strabo mentioned Ilasaros as the controller of Hadhramaut at that time.

Gallus undertook the expedition from Egypt by the command of Augustus, partly with a view to explore the country and its inhabitants, and partly to conclude treaties of friendship with the people, or to subdue them if they should oppose the Romans, for it was believed at the time that Arabia was full of all kinds of treasures.

When Aelius Gallus set out with his army, he trusted the guidance of a Nabataean called Syllaeus, who deceived and misled him. A long account of this expedition through the desert is given by Strabo—who derived most of his information about Arabia from his friend Aelius Gallus. Aelius Gallus initially set sail with 10,000 infantry consisting of Romans and Roman allies, among whom were five-hundred Jews and one thousand Nabataeans. They crossed the Red Sea, and after fourteen days landed at Leuke Kome in the land of the Nabataeans. Thence, they proceeded by foot and by camel to the land of Aretas. Thence, they passed through a wasteland called Ararenê, occupied by a nomadic people, and thence proceeded another fifty days until reaching Najran. From there they marched another six days where they arrived at a certain river where they joined battle with the local inhabitants, having slain 10,000 of them. Afterwards, they took the city called Asca, which had been forsaken by its king; and thence the Roman army proceeded to a city called Athrula; and, having mastered it without a struggle, Aelius Gallus placed a garrison in it, arranged for supplies of grain and dates for his march and advanced to a city called Marsiaba. Guglielmo Ferrero (The Greatness and Decline of Rome, v. IV, Chap. X, trans. Chaytor, Heinemann, London, 1908) suggests that this city is Marib. The burning heat of the sun, the bad water, and the want of every thing necessary to support life, produced a disease among the soldiers that was altogether unknown to the Romans, and destroyed the greater part of the army; so that the Arabs were not only not subdued, but succeeded in driving the Romans even from those parts of the country which they had previously possessed. At this time, Aelius Gallus and his army had spent six months on their military campaign in Arabia, on account of his treacherous guide, while he effected his retreat in sixty days, obliged to return to Alexandria, having lost the greater part of his force. The campaign is the subject of a 1951 novel, The Eagle and the Sun by Lord Belhaven, who had done military and civilian service in the region.

Aelius Gallus was recalled by Augustus for failure to pacify the Kushites and was succeeded as praefect by Gaius Petronius, a military commander and close friend of Augustus.

Political offices
Preceded by Cornelius Gallus	Prefect of Egypt; 26 BC–24 BC	Succeeded by Gaius Petronius
