= Byzantine Church (Petra) =

Church building in Petra, Jordan

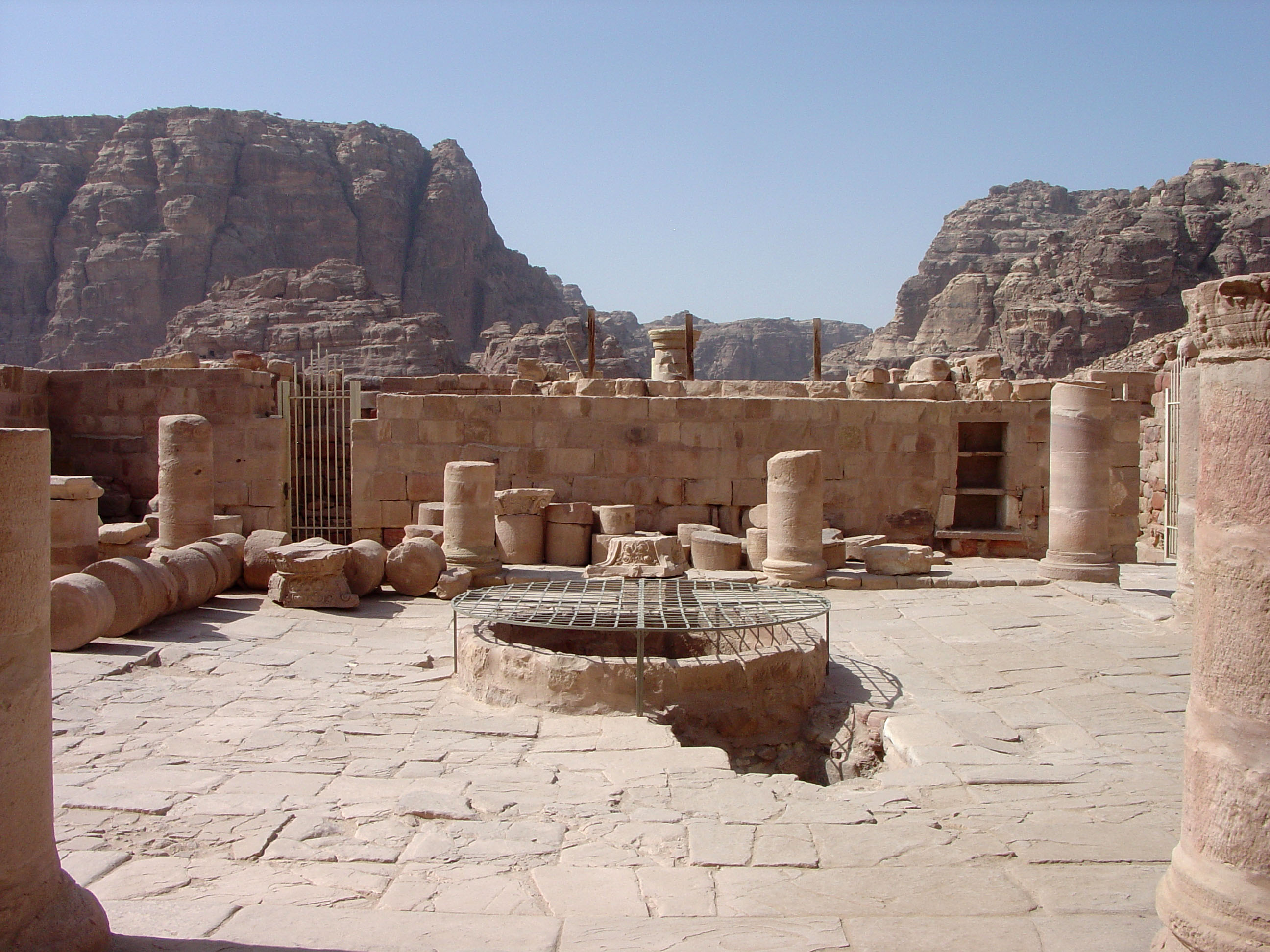
The Byzantine Church at Petra

The Byzantine Church at Petra (also known as The Petra Church) is a prime example of monumental architecture in Byzantine Petra. It sits on elevated ground in the city center, north of the so-called Colonnaded Street. It is one of three Byzantine churches on the hillside, the others two being the Ridge Church (or Red Church) and the Blue Chapel, the 5th - 6th century chapel north of the main church, so called because it was fashioned with blue Egyptian granite.

The Byzantine Church is notable for its lavish and well-preserved mosaic decoration.

The Byzantine Church is the find spot of 140 papyri that have provided scholars with valuable information about life in both Byzantine Petra and in its rural surroundings. These are referred to by scholars as the Petra papyri.

The church was excavated by the American Center of Oriental Research (ACOR) between 1992 and 2002.

According to Dr. Barbara A. Porter, Director of ACOR 2006-2020, while many elements of Petra's Byzantine history were known prior, the “remarkable concentration of church wealth” demonstrated via these three hillside churches is of great scholarly significance.

== Dating and phasing ==
Archaeologists have concluded that the Church was originally built in the second half of the fifth century CE. It continued to be used as a religious structure until about the early seventh century CE, when it was destroyed by fire.

Zbigniew Fiema notes that scholars distinguish “early” and “late” phases of construction. The early phase designates the church as originally built in the fifth century CE. The late phase corresponds to modifications carried out in the later sixth century CE.

In the sixth century, the atrium of the church was built to connect the cathedral portion of the church to the baptismal complex, joining them into one building. After the fire, materials from the Church were reused, including the glass tesserae (small cubes that make up mosaics) from the mosaics.

== Layout ==
The Church includes a baptismal complex, an atrium (or foyer space), and a cathedral. Inside the cathedral section, the “bema” or altar sits at one end of the nave on a raised platform that sits before three apses. The largest of these apses is the one in the center, where a cathedra, or bishop's throne, once sat. It is likely that wooden benches would have been attached to the walls of the Church.

The walls of the church are made of ashlar masonry. The chisel marks that are visible in the masonry are similar to those that appear in earlier Nabataean architecture, and indicate a continuity in masonry practices. The architecture of the Church includes Nabataean rock-chiseled elements and Roman and Hellenistic mosaic styles. The variety of architectural forms present at the Byzantine Church are part of a larger conversation on hybridism, a term in archaeology used when multiple cultural styles are present in one object or structure.

== Mosaics ==
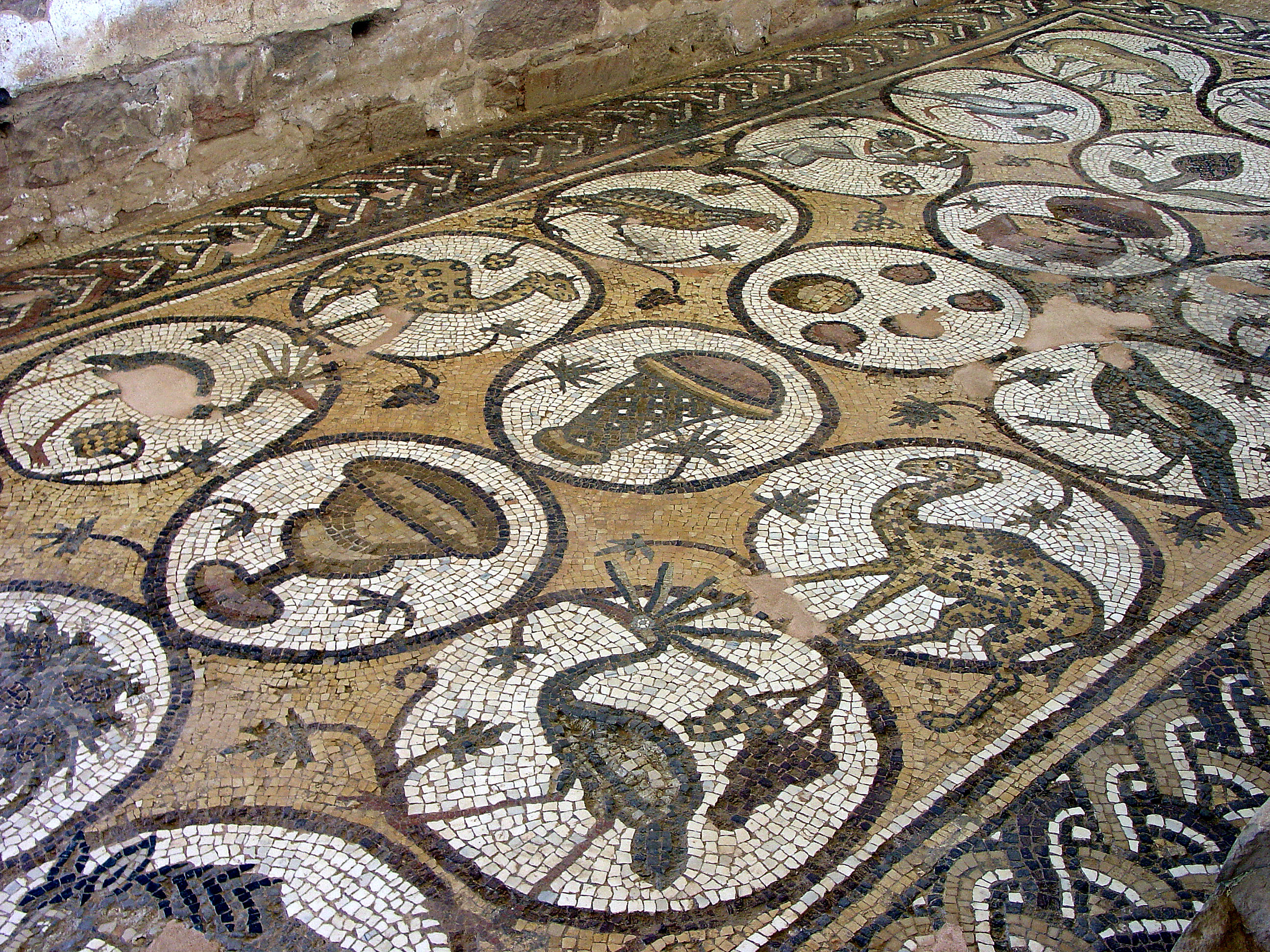
Mosaics from The Byzantine Church at Petra

Mosaics are also found on some portions of the church's walls. The floors of the nave are decorated with opus sectile floors, while the two smaller side aisles are decorated with colorful figurative mosaics. These are one of the most well-known features of the Church.

Detail of the aisle mosaics with animals in medallions

The mosaics in the aisles depict the seasons, animals, people, pottery, and plants. [See figure 1 for an image of the mosaics.] The mosaic's style is very similar to that of the Gaza school, and also shares similarities with Hellenistic and Roman iconography. This helps us to situate Nabataean architecture, and Petra, in its global context.

Conservation work has been done to preserve the mosaics. Conservators list the following as challenges they encountered throughout restoration: the detachment between mosaic layers, swelling, deterioration of the preparatory layers, the efflorescence of soluble salts to the surface, and the poor condition of tesserae due to fracturing, exfoliating, and erosion.

== See also ==
- Ridge Church
