= Leuke Kome =

Former Nabataean city now in Saudi Arabia

- وادي عينونة (Arabic)
- Wadi Ainounah
- Location within Saudi Arabia
- Location: Saudi Arabia
- Region: Tabuk Region

Leuke Kome (Greek: λευκή κώμη, lit. 'white village') was a Nabataean port city located on the Incense Route. It may have been in the vicinity of the village now known as Aynuna (Arabic: وادي عينونة), Saudi Arabia, but other theories suggest that it was located at al-Wajh.

== History ==
The port is known from Strabo's Geography and the Periplus of the Erythraean Sea.

Now to the left of Berenice, sailing for two or three days from Mussel Harbor eastward across the adjacent gulf, there is another harbor and fortified place, which is called White Village, from which there is a road to Petra, which is subject to Malichas, King of the Nabataeans. It holds the position of a market-town for the small vessels sent there from Arabia; and so a centurion is stationed there as a collector of one-fourth of the merchandise imported, with an armed force, as a garrison.

Strabo mentions the village in his account of the failed Roman invasion of Arabia thus:

"After enduring great hardships and distress, he (Aelius Gallus) arrived on the fifteenth day at Leuce-Come, a large mart in the territory of the Nabataeans..."

Leuke Kome was one of the main trading centers on the Red Sea.

== Location ==
Numerous locations for the village have been proposed:

- the most prominent suggestion is at Aynuna, near the entrance to the Gulf of Aqaba, where remains of a Nabataean settlement are documented
- others have favored al-Wajh, 250 km farther south, on topographical and literary grounds.
- the Farasan Islands, off the coast of southern Saudi Arabia, based on the find of two Latin inscriptions documenting Roman military presence in the 2nd century

== See also ==
- Mada'in Saleh
- Mount Arafat
