= Glen Bowersock =

American historian (born 1936)

Glen Warren Bowersock (born January 12, 1936) is a historian of ancient Greece, Rome and the Near East, and former chairman of Harvard’s classics department.

== Early life ==
Bowersock was born in Providence, Rhode Island, and attended The Rivers School in Chestnut Hill, Massachusetts. He earned his A.B. summa cum laude from Harvard University (1957), another B.A. with First Class Honors in Literae humaniores from Oxford University (1959); and his M.A., D.Phil. (1962, for thesis titled Augustus and the Greek world) also at Oxford. His mentor was the renowned Roman historian Ronald Syme.

== Career ==
Bowersock has served as lecturer in ancient history at Balliol, Magdalen, and New College, Oxford (1960–62), Professor of Classics and History, Harvard University (1962–80) (full Professor from 1969). Bowersock was Professor of Ancient History at the Institute for Advanced Study from 1980 until his retirement in 2006. He is the author of over a dozen books and has published over 400 articles on Greek, Roman, and Near Eastern history and culture as well as the classical tradition.

Bowersock formerly served as Professor of Classics and History at Harvard University. During his career at Harvard (1962 to 1980), he served as Professor of Classics and History; Chairman of the Classics Department; and Associate Dean of the Faculty of Arts and Sciences. He is a member of the American Academy of Arts and Sciences. In 1989, he was elected to membership in the American Philosophical Society.

== Honors ==
Bowersock has received numerous honorary degrees, including: University of Strasbourg (Sciences Humaines), Docteur honoris causa (1990), Ecole Pratique des Hautes Etudes (Paris), Docteur honoris causa (1999), University of Athens, Doctor honoris causa (2005). He is also an Honorary Fellow of Balliol College, Oxford (2004) at which he was once a Rhodes Scholar.

Bowersock was awarded the James Henry Breasted Prize of the American Historical Association for his book Hellenism in Late Antiquity. A symposium in his honor was held at Princeton University on April 7, 2006, under the title East and West: A Conference in Honor of Glen W. Bowersock, the proceedings of which were published by the Harvard University Press in 2008.

He is a Foreign Member of the Accademia Nazionale dei Lincei in Italy, Associé étranger de l'Académie des Inscriptions et Belles-Lettres, and Foreign Member of the Russian Academy of Sciences. He has also been awarded the insignia of Knight of the Legion of Honour and Knight of the Ordre des Arts et des Lettres.

== Selected works ==
- Xenophon, Constitution of the Athenians, edited and translated, Harvard University Press, 1968
- Augustus and the Greek World (Oxford, 1965) ISBN 978-0-19-814250-8
- Greek Sophists in the Roman Empire (Oxford, 1969) ISBN 978-0-19-814279-9
- Julian the Apostate, Harvard University Press, 1978 ISBN 978-0-674-48882-3
- Gibbon's Historical Imagination (Stanford, 1988).
- Hellenism in Late Antiquity [Jerome Lectures] (Michigan and Cambridge U.P., 1990) ISBN 978-0-472-06418-2
- Fiction as History, from Nero to Julian [Sather Classical Lectures] (University of California Press, 1994). ISBN 978-0-520-08824-5 Available online from eScholarship editions at the University of California.
- Martyrdom and Rome [Wiles Lectures] (Cambridge University Press, 1995) ISBN 978-0-521-53049-1
- Roman Arabia, Harvard University Press, 1983, 1994 (first paperback ed.) ISBN 978-0-674-77756-9
- Late Antiquity: A Guide to the Postclassical World edited with Peter Brown and Oleg Grabar, Harvard University Press, 1999 ISBN 978-0-674-51173-6
- Interpreting Late Antiquity, Harvard University Press, 2001 ISBN 978-0-674-00598-3
- Mosaics as History: The Near East from Late Antiquity to Islam, Harvard University Press, 2006 ISBN 978-0-674-02292-8
- Lorenzo Valla, On the Donation of Constantine, edition and translation, Harvard University Press, 2007 ISBN 978-0-674-03089-3
- From Gibbon to Auden: Essays on the Classical Tradition, Oxford University Press, 2009 ISBN 978-0-19-985694-7
- The Throne of Adulis: Red Sea Wars on the Eve of Islam, Oxford University Press, 2013 ISBN 978-0-19-973932-5
- The Crucible of Islam, Harvard University Press, 2017 ISBN 978-0-674-05776-0

== References and sources ==
Sources

- IAS homepage
- Bowersock's bibliography 1961–present
