= Cyzicenus =

Cyzicenus may refer to:

== People ==
- Antiochus IX Cyzicenus, a king of the Seleucid Empire.
- Gelasius of Cyzicus (Gelasius Cyzicenus), an ecclesiastical writer in the 5th century

== Other ==
- Cyzicene hall, an architectural term.
