= Accubitum =

Ancient Roman furniture

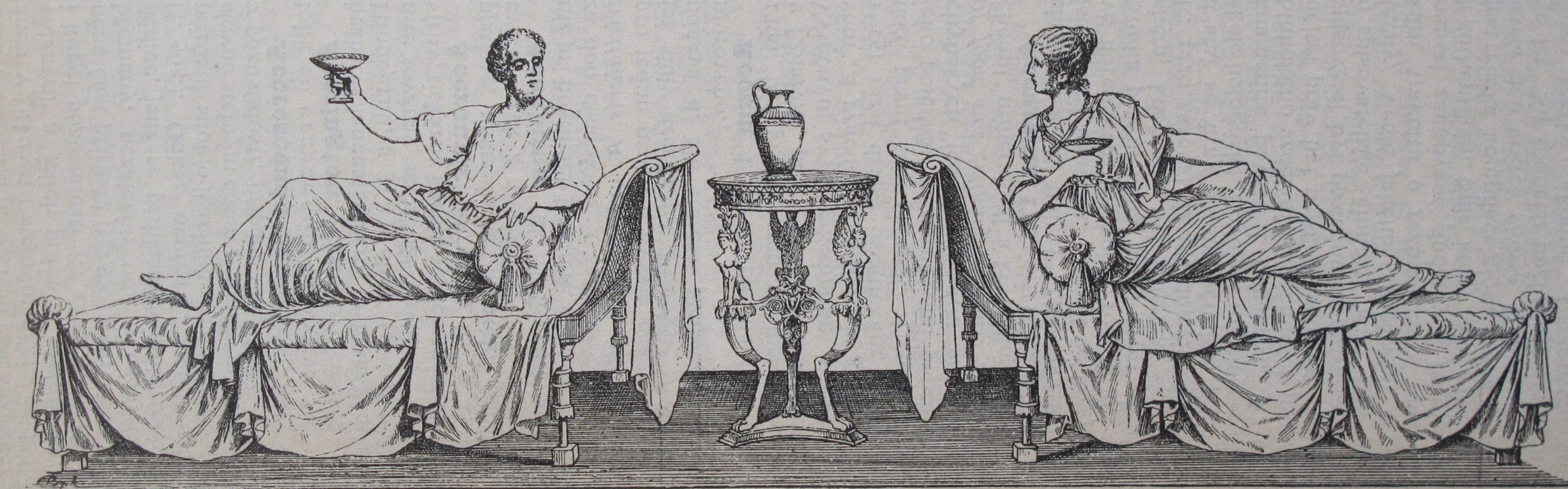
19th century drawing of ancient Romans on accubita

Accubitum (pl.: accubita) was one name for the ancient Roman furniture couches used in the time of the Roman emperors, in the triclinium or dining room, for reclining upon at meals. It was also sometimes the name of the dining room itself or a niche for a couch. Sometimes it denotes a multi-person curved couch, for which the term stibadium is also used. Klinai is the Greek equivalent, sometimes also used. Frequently, the Romans would gild these couches with silver or bronze.

The mattresses and feather-beds were softer and higher, and their supports (fulcra) were lower in proportion than those of older triclinium couches. The cloths and pillows spread over them, and over beds, were called accubitalia.
