= Tomb of the Roman Soldier =

Tomb in Petra

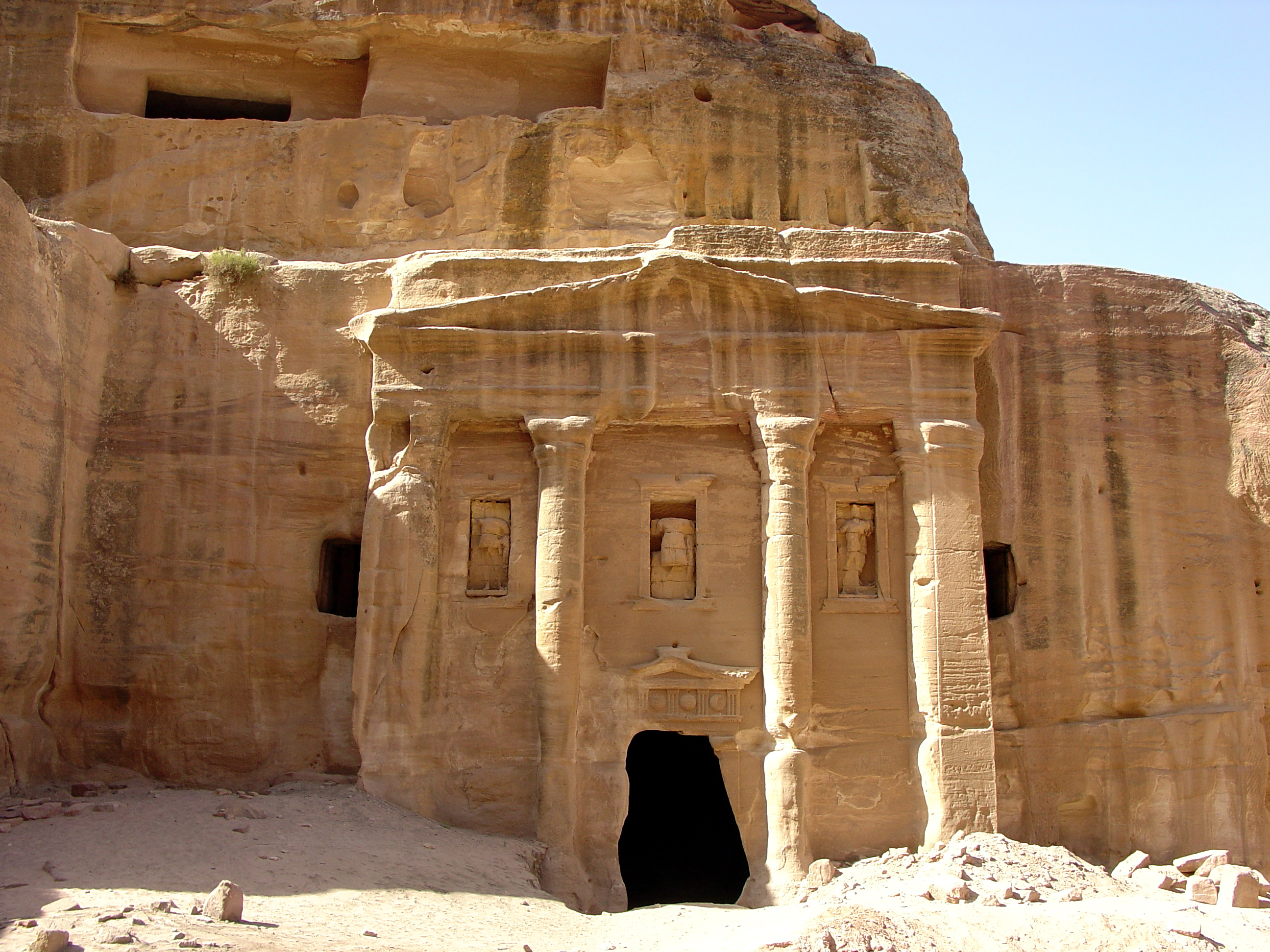
Main façade.

The Tomb of the Roman Soldier, also called the Tomb of the Soldier, is one of the best-preserved tombs in the ancient city of Petra, in what is now Jordan. Although its façade is its most recognizable feature — with three carved figures inset between columns — the tomb complex consists of several different architectural elements with varying degrees of preservation. In addition to the tomb façade, there is an associated courtyard, the remains of several two-story buildings, rock-cut rooms, a triclinium (or formal dining room), and several large cisterns. The main building phase of the tomb complex took place during the third quarter of the 1st century AD.

== Location ==
The Tomb of the Soldier is located on the southeastern outskirts of the city center of Petra, in the valley known as Wadi Farasa. Its position between eastern Wadi Farasa and the path up to a major high place of sacrifice, leads archaeologists to speculate that it may have acted as a territorial marker or gateway between the two spaces.

== Layout, architecture, statuary ==
=== Tomb ===
Stephan G. Schmid, an archaeologist excavating the site on behalf of the Palestine Exploration Fund, associates the raised position of the tomb in regard to the courtyard and the other structures of the complex with the tomb's function as a monumental structure.

==== Facade ====
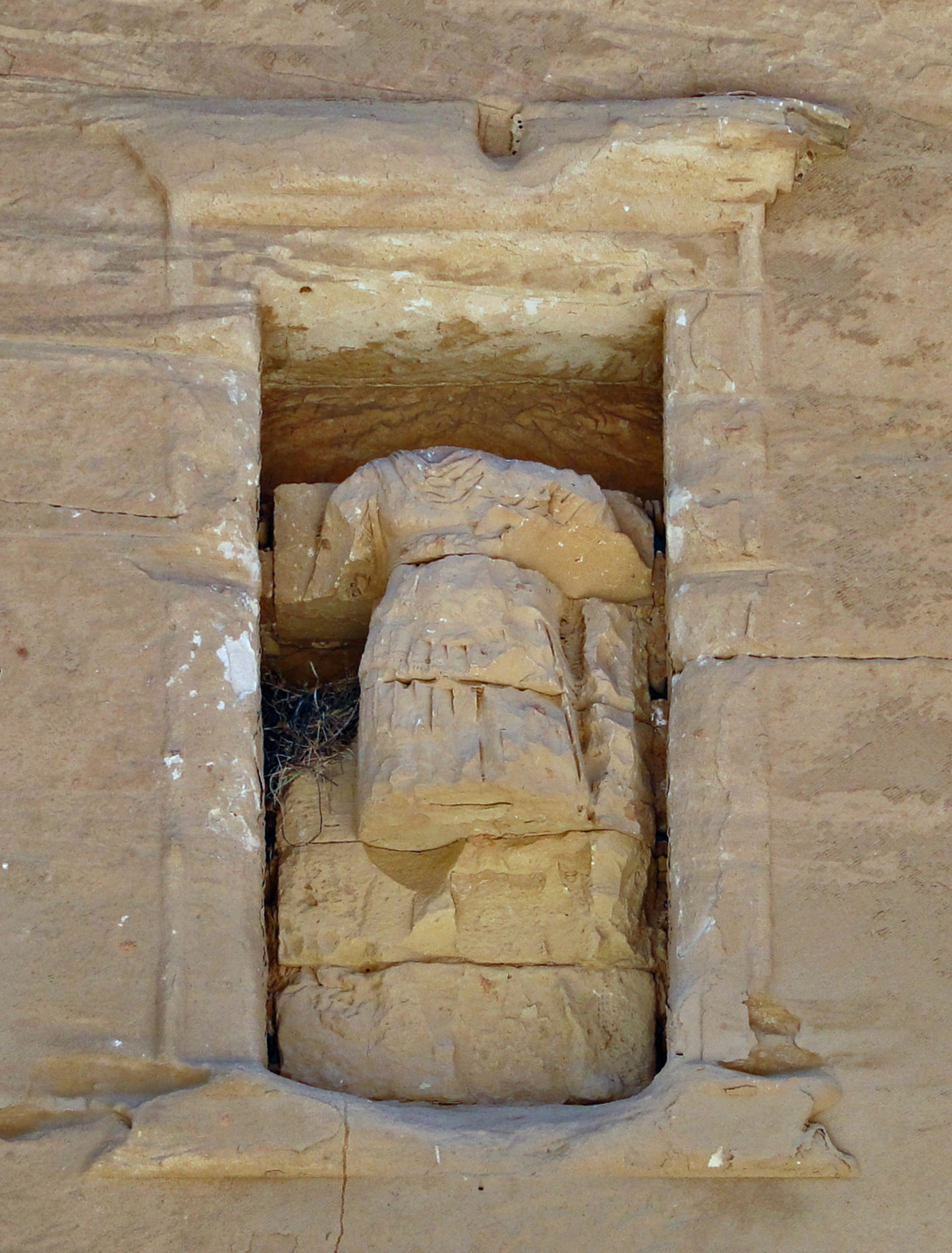
Center carved figure in the main façade.

The main façade of the Tomb of the Soldier is 14 meters high and has four columns topped with Nabataean capitals. Above these columns are a frieze and a pediment. Between the four columns there are three niches, each containing an inset male stone figure made out of six limestone blocks. The middle inset figure is dressed in a Graeco-Roman military style cuirass.

There is one entrance to the tomb, which lies in the center of the façade. Above this entrance is a Doric entablature with a pattern of alternating triglyphs and metopes. Directly above it is a simple pediment.

Door

The entrance to the tomb appears to have had two small carved pillars framing its doorway, although the left column (from the perspective of one looking at the facade) has eroded away. It measures only 1.6 m in width but 3.6 m in height. According to Schmid, this is significant because this door is surprisingly narrow for such a monumental construction.

The threshold of the door and the interior floor of the tomb were built of huge stone slabs at a height exactly one meter higher than the elevation of the courtyard, with two stone steps leading to the threshold. The stone threshold may have been topped by a wooden threshold, judging by archaeological evidence of charcoal fragments that have been excavated in the area.

Statuary

The architectural language of the three carved male figure reliefs is also significant. The central figure wears the aforementioned Graeco-Roman cuirass, and is flanked by two young male figures who are almost nude and standing in the contrapposto position. According to Schmid, these characteristics are in keeping with Mediterranean artistic and iconographic traditions; however, interestingly, despite mutilation, both of their heads show evidence that they had long hair. Long hair on male statuary was not in keeping with how Roman or Greek males were depicted during this time period, and so some archaeologists see this as a clear indication of Nabatean background or influence of the subject.

Analysis

The architectural characteristics of the façade of the Tomb of the Soldier are similar to that of the façade of the Urn Tomb at Petra. Both tombs have three alcoves framed by the four main columns, and both appear (despite the more eroded nature of the Roman Soldier Tomb) to have a very similar central entrance, column, frieze, and pediment decoration.

==== Interior ====
Inside the Tomb of the Soldier, there are two distinct spaces. The first is a space with several niches carved into the wall, most likely for burial purposes. To the left there is a doorway leading to the second space, an antechamber with bare walls.

=== Courtyard ===
In the foreground of the tomb are the architectural remains of a courtyard which was encircled by a colonnade and a two-story building on the right side of the tomb façade. There also are the remains of several large cisterns which supplied water to the complex.

=== The "Coloured Triclinium" ===
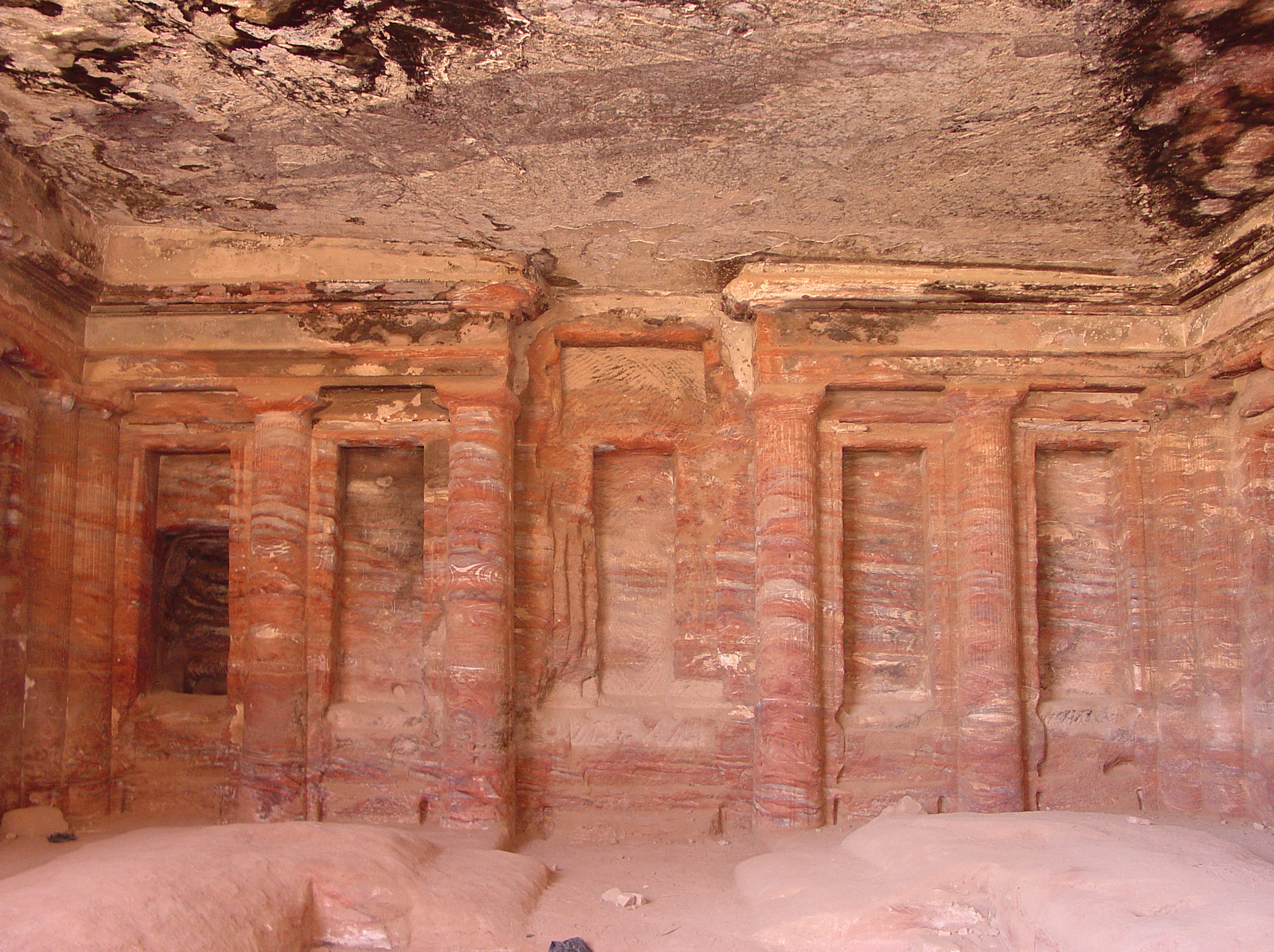
The "Coloured Triclinium"

Directly across the courtyard from the main tomb façade is a separate triclinium, long known as the Coloured Triclinium. This space is much more ornately carved than the tomb structure itself. Along the walls of the triclinium there are alternating columns and shallow alcoves, and in the middle of the room there are the remains of a U-shaped triple bench which in Roman society was used for sitting or reclining.

== Purpose ==
There is also architectural evidence of multifunctionality for the large Tomb site. This conclusion is drawn from examinations of the large cisterns at the site, the water channels built to manage drain flow and prevent erosion through the site, and the dumped pottery material recovered near the retaining walls of the compound. Based on this evidence, at some point in the history of Tomb of the Soldier complex there were one or more luxurious bathing compounds on the site. This would mean, significantly, that at certain points in the tombs history, part of its design purpose was also for bathing.

== Preservation ==
The Tomb of the Soldier is relatively well preserved in comparison with other monumental tombs at Petra. This level of preservation has allowed archaeologists to gather important information for comparison of the varied tomb and compound structure around the city of Petra. These comparisons are valuable because they in turn provide more information which can be used to further theorize how these spaces were used and considered by the populations who created them.
