= Stibadium =

Ancient Roman furniture

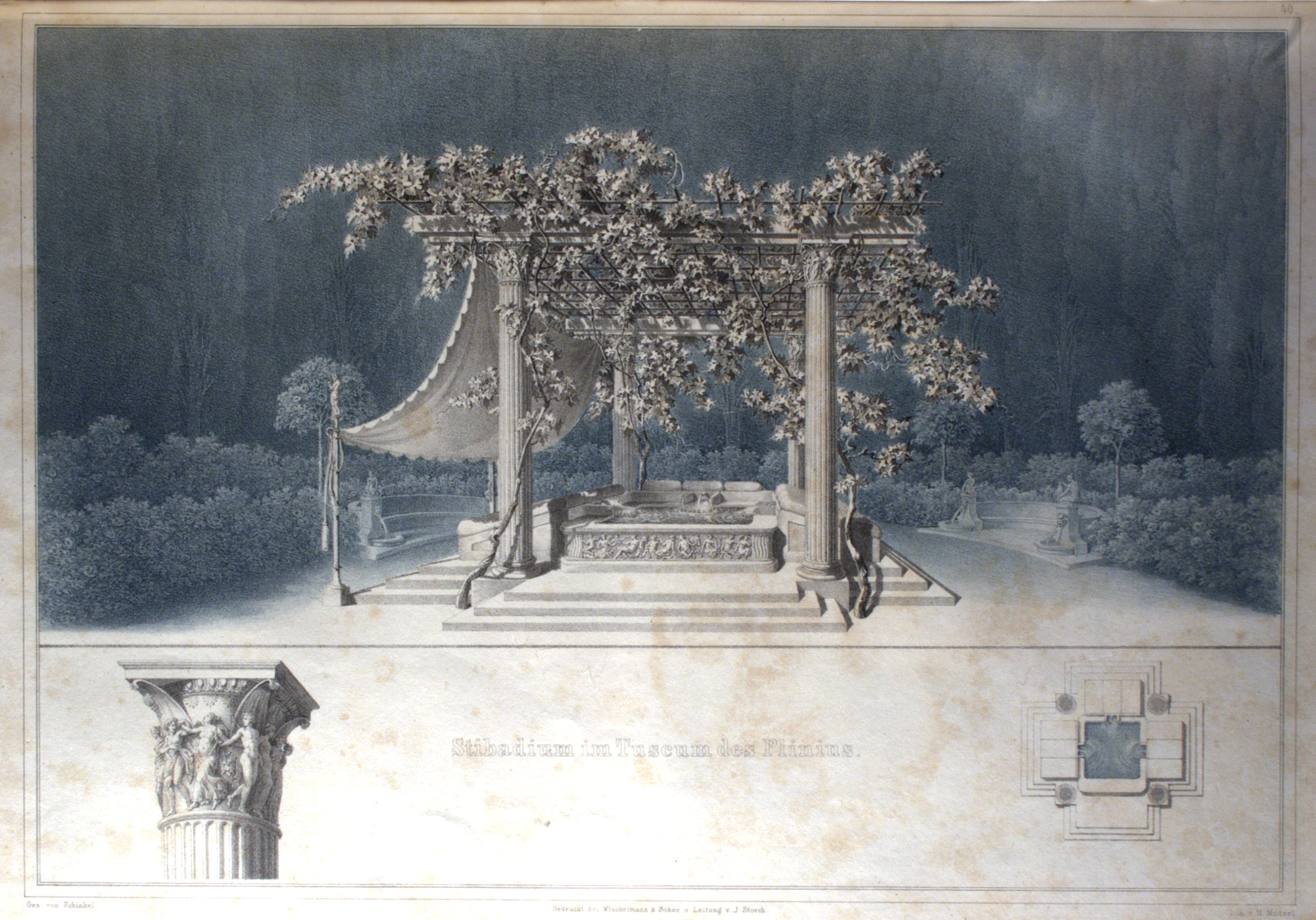
Stibadium of Plinius, reconstruction by Karl Friedrich Schinkel

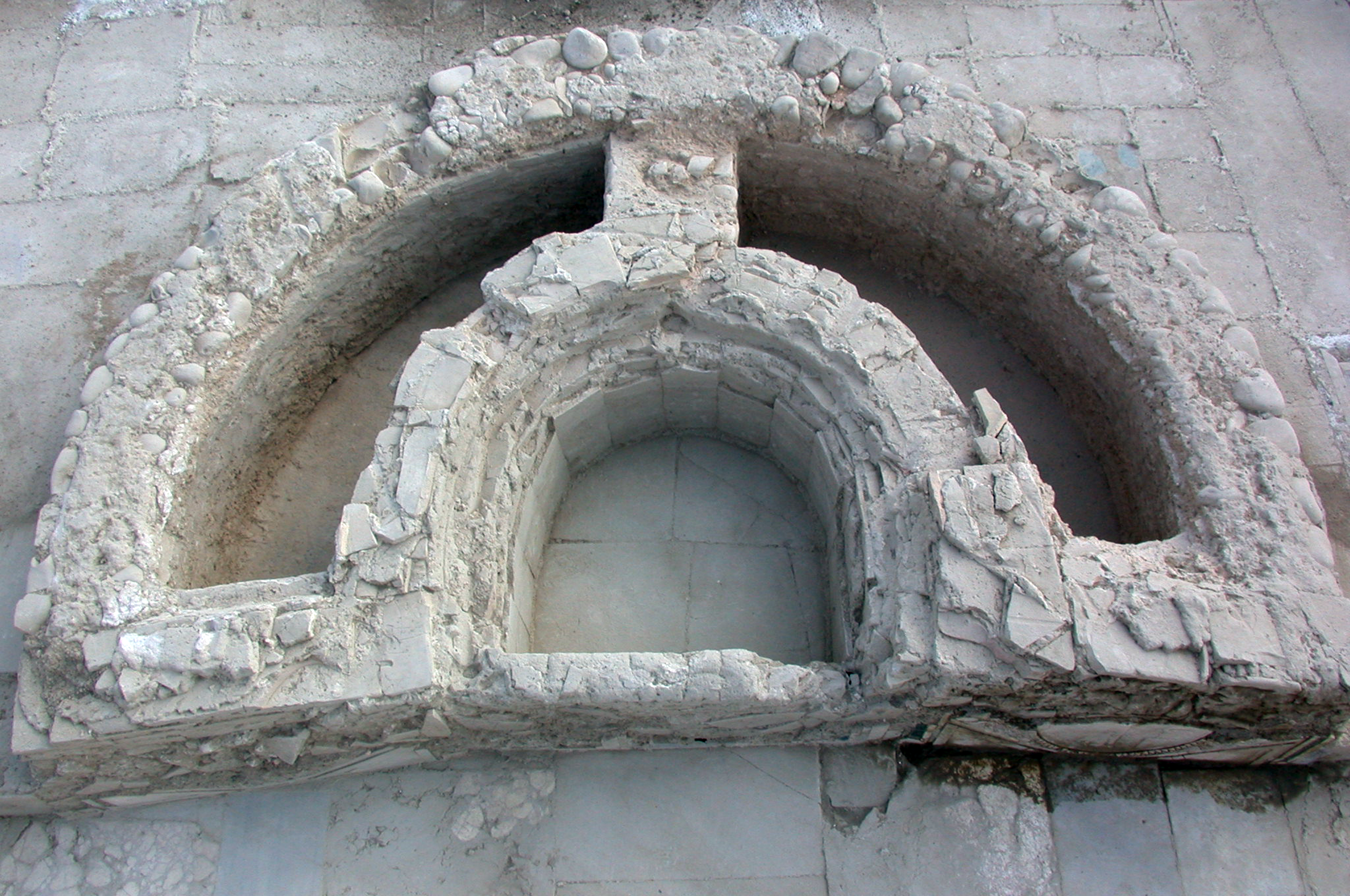
Stibadium of Roman villa of Faragola with the water basin in the centre

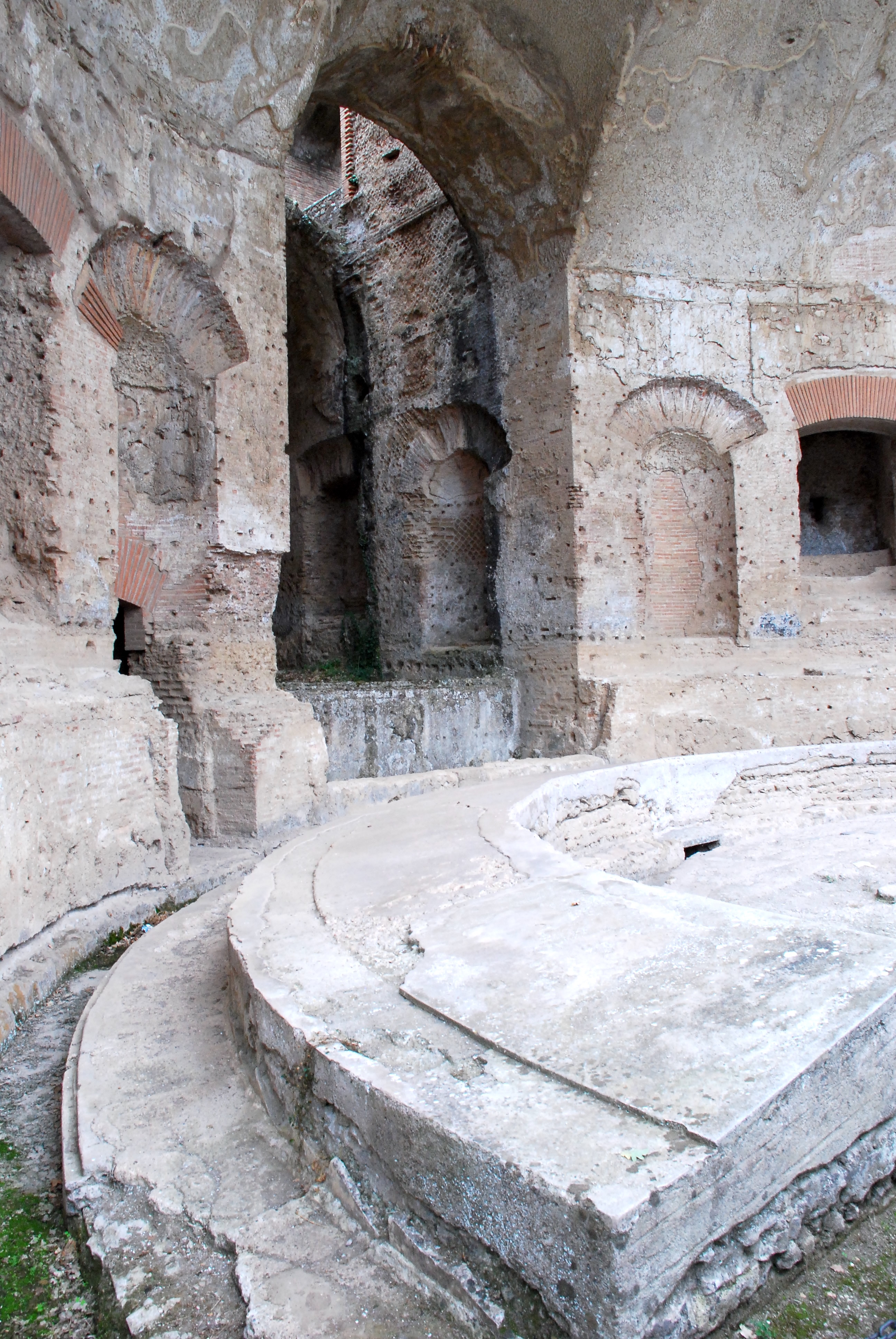
Stibadium of Serapeum at Hadrian's Villa

The stibadium (pl.: stibadia) is a later form of the ancient Roman lectus triclinaris, the reclining seat used by diners in the triclinium. Originally, the lecti were arranged in a group of three in a semicircle. The stibadium was a single semicircular couch, seating up to a dozen people, which replaced the triple group of lecti in the dining room, frequently in alcoves around the centre of the room. In large Roman villas stibadia often became very elaborate.

This furniture is also called sigma. This name comes from the lunate sigma (upper case C, lower case ϲ) which resembles, but is not at all related to the Latin letter C and was used in Eastern forms of Greek writing and in the Middle Ages.

The stibadium was originally an outdoor seat but was introduced indoors in the 2nd and 3rd centuries AD because the shape was more convenient for entertaining and as triclinia became larger and more elaborate.

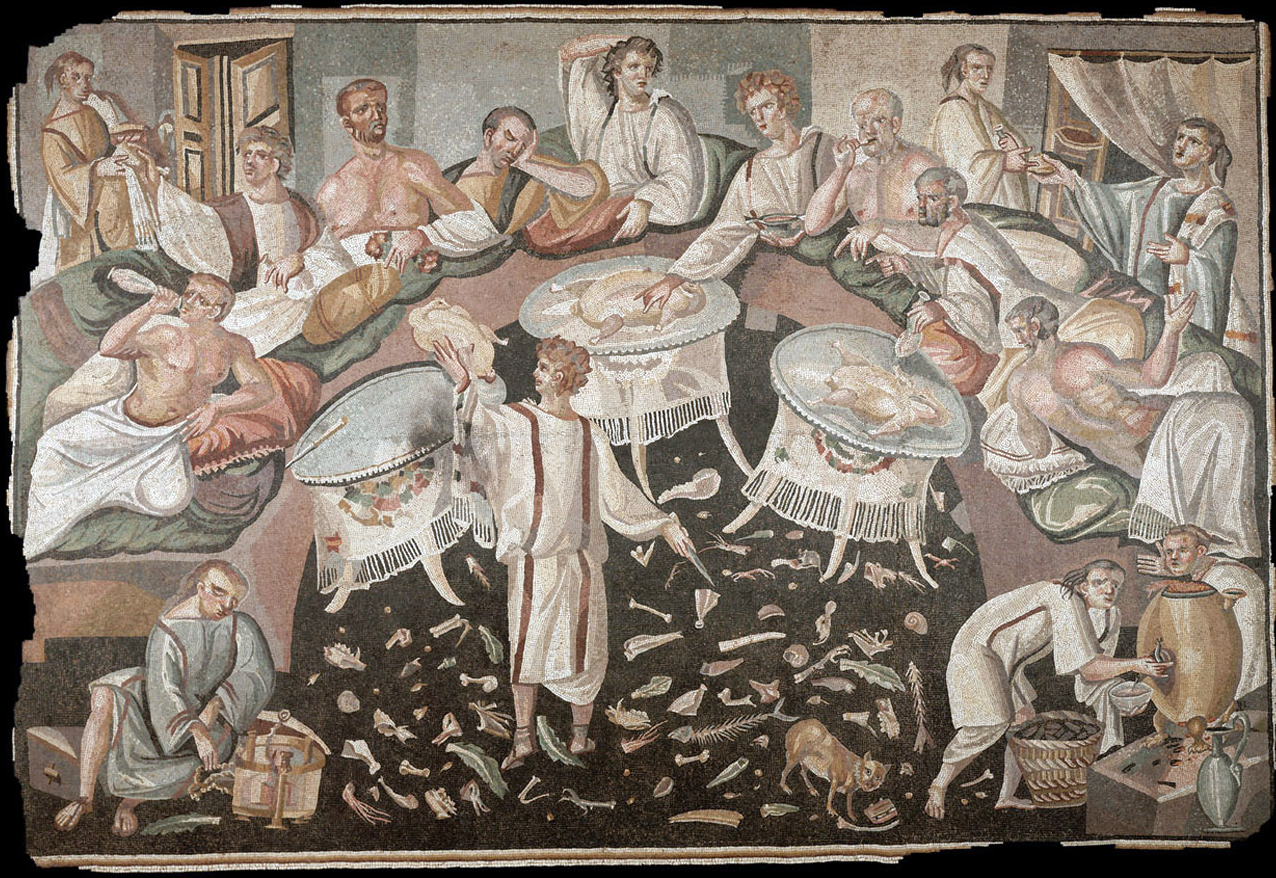
Stibadium on a mosaic in Chateau de Boudry, 5th century

Films about ancient Roman convivia often feature a stibadium rather than a lectus.

== Examples ==
Roman villas with stibadia include the:

- Roman villa of Faragola
- Pliny's villa "in Tuscis"
- Hadrian's Villa
- Villa El Ruedo (Spain)
- Nymphaeum Utere Felix (Carthage)

== See also ==
- Accubitum
- Ancient Roman cuisine
- Klinē
