= Roman villa of Faragola =

Ancient Roman villa in Italy

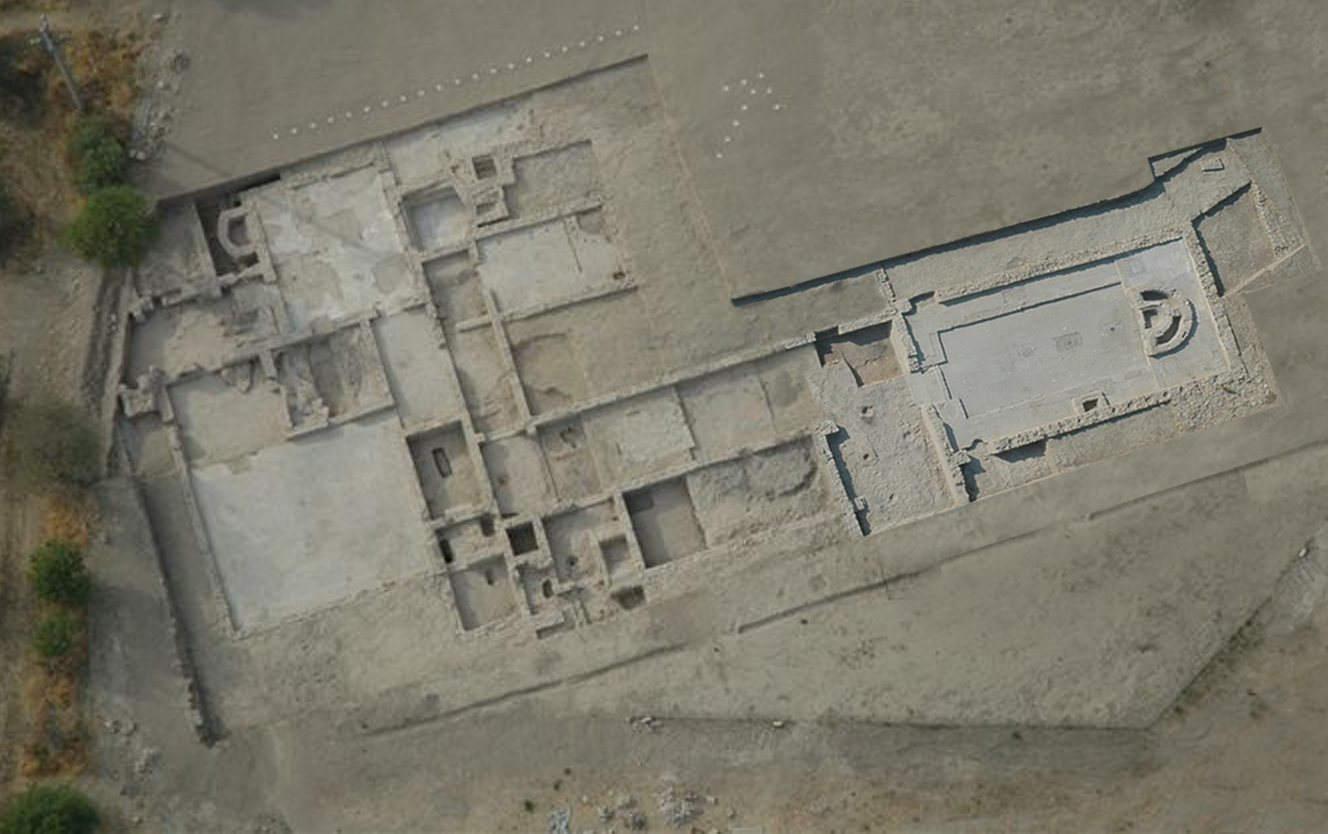
Aerial view

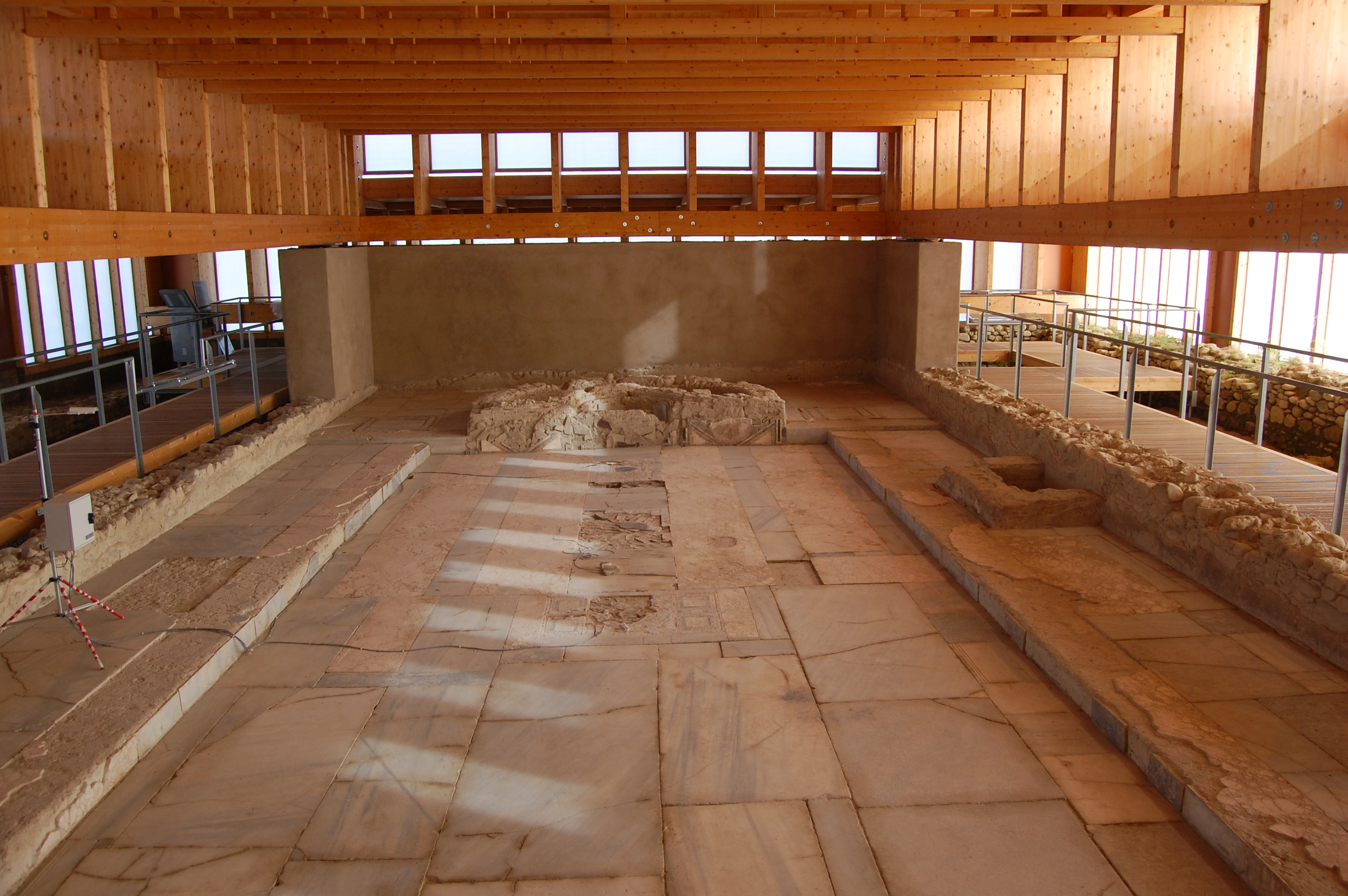
The dining room (Cenatio)

The ancient Roman villa of Faragola was a large (at least 1200 m^{2}), luxurious residence 5 km from ancient Ausculum (Ascoli Satriano) in today's province of Foggia. Excavations since 2001 have revealed part of the estate with elaborate thermal baths and dining room. It experienced its greatest size between the 4th and 6th centuries, unusually late for Roman villas.

It was along the route of the via Aurelia Aeclanensis (which connected Herdonia to Aeclanum, and the via Appia with the via Traiana).

The villa is important in showing continuity in aristocratic life in the middle of the fifth century, in an elsewhere difficult period, and in relation to the letters of Symmachus, himself owner of villae in southern Italy, and the testimony of Sidonius Apollinaris. In addition to offering pleasant vacations, the owner exploited it for patronage and business.

== History ==
The villa was built on the remains of a Daunian settlement from the 4th - 3rd century BC and a Roman villa rustica of the 1st-3rd century AD.

The later villa had two main phases: the first of the 3rd-4th century with a large peristyle and an atrium, with numerous rooms arranged around it; then in the 5th-6th century, greatly modified, partially reusing the rooms and spaces of the previous villa, with the addition of large baths, a spectacular summer dining room (cenatio), numerous service rooms and an increase in height, with residential rooms located on the upper floor, typical of late antiquity models.

It belonged to a senatorial family, perhaps a branch of the Cornelia gens according to an inscription.

The villa is evidence that the area enjoyed a long period of relative tranquility and security during the "Crisis of the Third Century" and also over the next century, unlike the central-northern regions which experienced economic decline and rural depopulation. The fortunate central position of this area in the Mediterranean and the good land and sea network were decisive factors for the investment by the rich Roman senatorial aristocracy and local notables in the 4th and 5th centuries, and for the holding of the imperial property which was significant in this area. This territory experienced an economic boom and a significant growth in the rural population, with the numerous villas, farms, villages, churches and rural dioceses identified by surface reconnaissance and aerial photography. It was one of the last enclaves, between the 5th and 6th centuries, of great estates and of economic development linked to agriculture, livestock farming, craftsmanship and trade, while elsewhere in Italy the system was crumbling.

It seems to have been abandoned around the second half of the 6th century, with subsequent complex phases of occupancy which lasted at least until the mid-second half of the 9th century. The cause, as of all the late antique villas in the area, appears connected to the political-military instability first of the Greek-Gothic war and, after the Byzantine reconquest, to the long phase of Langobard penetration leading to the progressive thinning and disappearance of the Roman aristocratic class

In the 7th century a village and farm settlement made most of the rooms usable for residential or industrial purposes (furnaces, clay settling tanks, pits for smelting metals, etc.). New residential room 71, presumably identifiable with residential room 72, involved a complex renovation of the eastern perimeter wall of the portico of the cenatio, and another new residential nucleus was room 17 (7.5 × 5 m) north-east of the entrance to the baths, with cocciopesto flooring. Also a monumental entrance was created with quadrangular pillars of the previous access area to the cenatio-bath complex near the large stone threshold. It is likeley that an agricultural company, probably by the Longobards as attested by written sources, organised the complex.

In the 8th c. the village became a collection of wooden huts and farm buildings, animal enclosures, systems for the conservation of foodstuffs and spaces for artisanal and agricultural activities.

=== Archaeology ===
The area was acquired in 1997 by the municipality of Ascoli Satriano. In 2009 the Archaeological park of Faragola was partially opened to the public, with the summer dining room (cenatio). In the following years the museum arrangement also involved the baths as well as various service rooms, warehouses, kitchens and a brick kiln.

The excavated area is of a residential villa (or pars urbana) but from aerial photography and geophysics, a site located just 1.5 km away in the Sedia d'Orlando area was probably the agricultural part (pars rustica) of the villa. Several buildings including a three-winged porticoed building, a warehouse with dolia, a duct system and a series of furnaces could have been for the storage of products with an adjoining port on the Carapelle river.

== The site ==
=== The 3rd-4th century villa ===
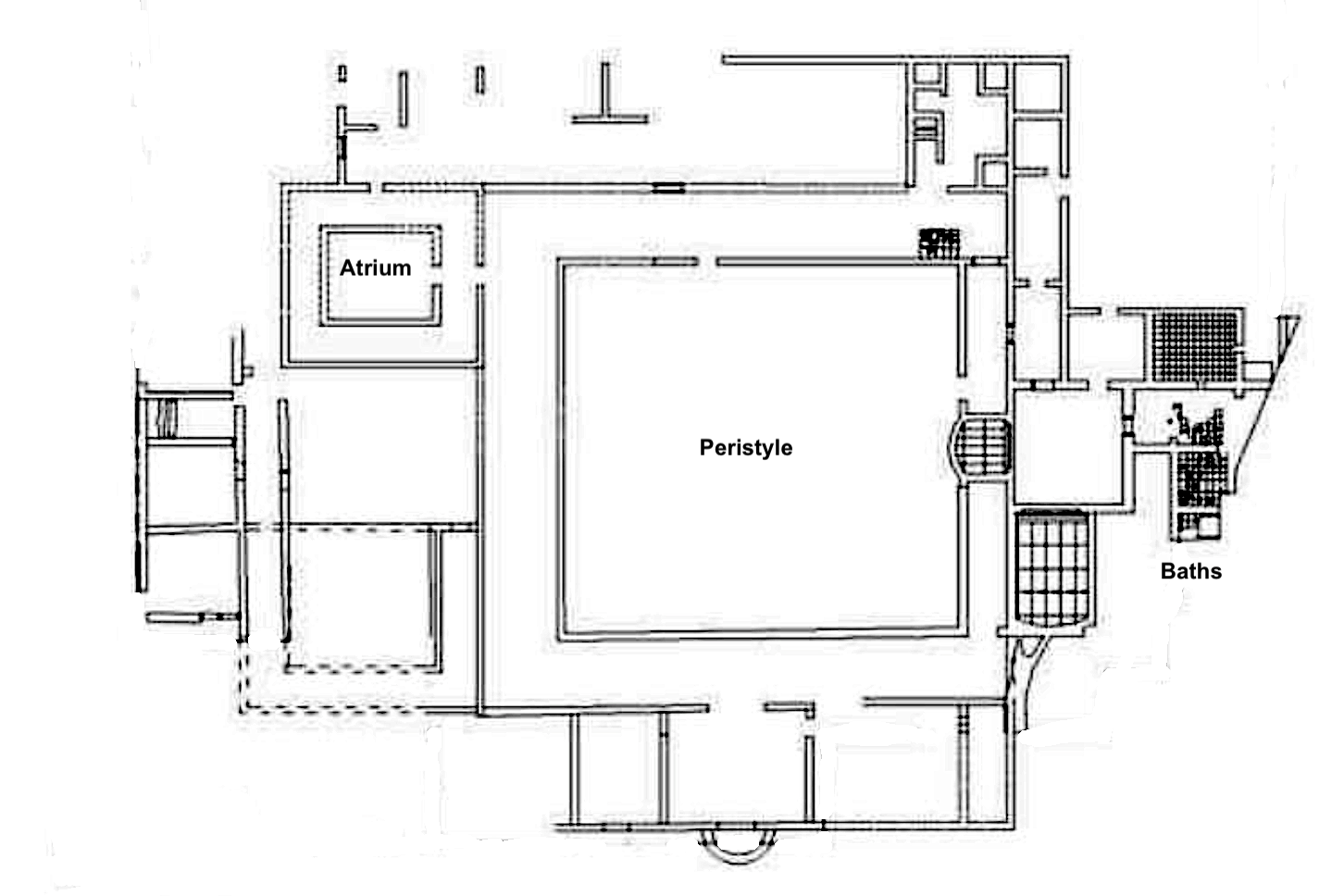
Plan of 3rd-4th c. villa

The remains of the first phase of the later villa show that it was large and very luxurious. The residential nucleus was where the large cenatio was built later. It had a large porticoed peristyle and the original baths at the South-West. The peristyle has an overall area (approx. 1225 m^{2}) that puts it in the group of larger villas to which, for example, those in Piazza Armerina and Patti Marina belong.

Along the western arm of the peristyle a series of rooms (97, 98, 99) were probably pre-existing, incorporated and restructured at the same time as the monumental garden with raising of the paths and movement of the entrance to the rooms on the eastern side, with a direct opening onto the portico.

An atrium (66) was surrounded by a portico (61, 64, 65).

Many of the rooms (67, 68, 69, 70) and some rooms of the baths (14, 18, 25, 19, 20, 21, 22, 23, 31) were abandoned around the second half of the 4th century AD, while others, such as the baths and the eastern corridor of the great peristyle, were incorporated into the new construction. The earthquake of 346 AD damaged numerous buildings in the nearby city of Herdonia and may have damaged the villa.

=== The 5th-6th century villa ===
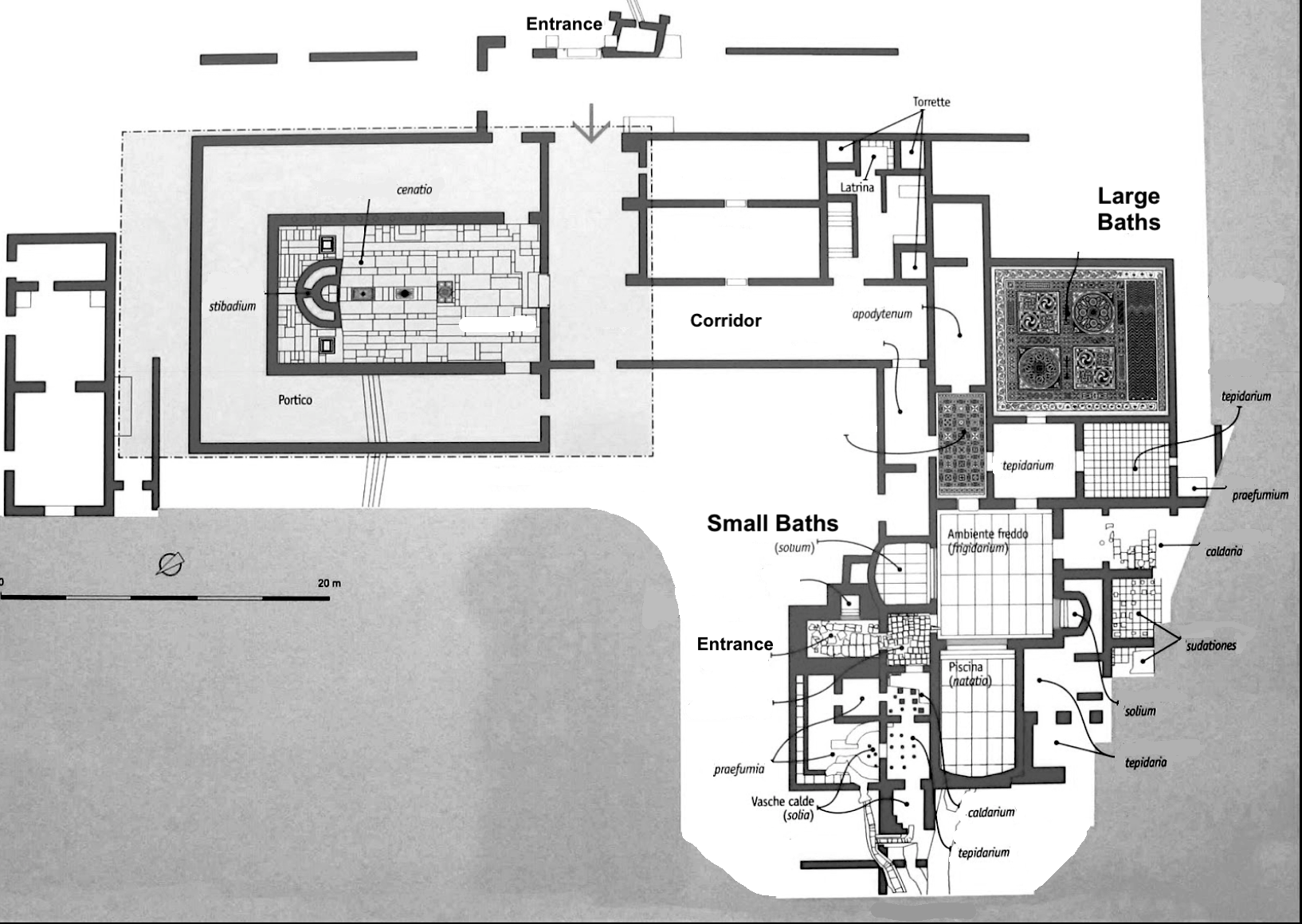
Plan of 5th c. villa

The villa underwent radical modification in the 5th century when the luxurious dining room (cenatio) was built, and the baths underwent considerable expansion and embellishment, with a double bath system. Several service areas and a warehouse were created.

The walls of the west of the peristyle and the rooms on the eastern side of the portico were demolished and razed. Many of the rooms (67, 68, 69, 70) and some rooms of the old baths (14, 18, 25, 19, 20, 21, 22, 23, 31) were reused in the great baths of the V-VI century.

The villa also gained an upper floor which was a trend typical of late antique building, as at the villas of San Giovanni di Ruoti and Quote S. Francesco.

=== The baths ===
The baths are one of the largest private Roman baths known in Italy, having an area of over 1000 m^{2}. The floor and wall decoration is comparable to the most luxurious late antique aristocratic villas.

The original nucleus perhaps dating to the 1st-2nd century AD was the subject of successive renovations, expansions and modifications during the 3rd, 4th and 5th centuries AD. It consists of two contiguous areas, with independent entrances and different construction and dimensional features. The Small Baths (rooms 27, 28, 32, 40, 41, 43, 44) to the north-west of the Large Baths appear to be later and intended as an alternative or replacement, perhaps due to technical problems or to their considerable size and reduced use.

The central position of the baths could be to create a connection to the dining room through a long corridor, conceived as a proper official route (rooms 5 and 26).

One room (3) adjoining the baths of 100 m^{2} area is strikingly large, and probably a palaestra, intended as a reception and multifunctional area, with a refined polychrome mosaic covered with a large repertoire of geometric motifs. It was probably used for entertainment, massages and perhaps for gymnastics. The large frigidarium (cold room) (19) was equipped with two basins (20, 23) and a swimming pool (natatio) (31), with vaults decorated with polychrome mosaic tiles of glass paste and wall decorations in opus sectile with a plinth in cipollino marble, and a floor in smooth slabs of white marble with a central emblem. Mosaics, wall coverings in marble veneer and stucco with frames of palmettes and ovoli also characterise the two tepidaria (warm rooms) (18, 25), while pink-coloured breccia marble is used to for the floor of the long rectangular caldarium (hot room) (21, 22, 23) and of the two sudatoria (sweating rooms) (24-27). For extreme refinement, white and light marbles were used for the frigidaria, while warm and pink marbles covered the caldaria.

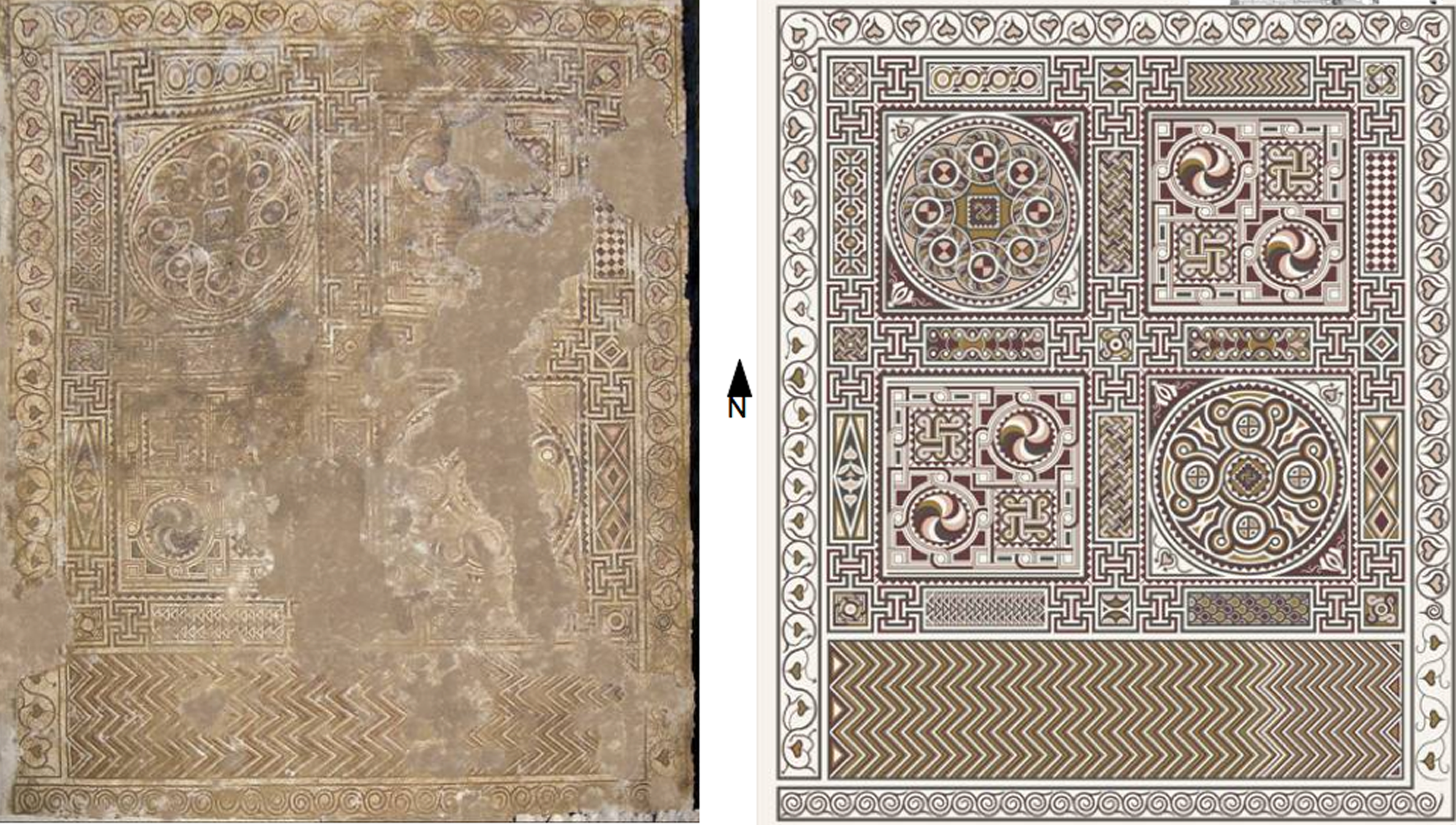
mosaic of the large room of the baths

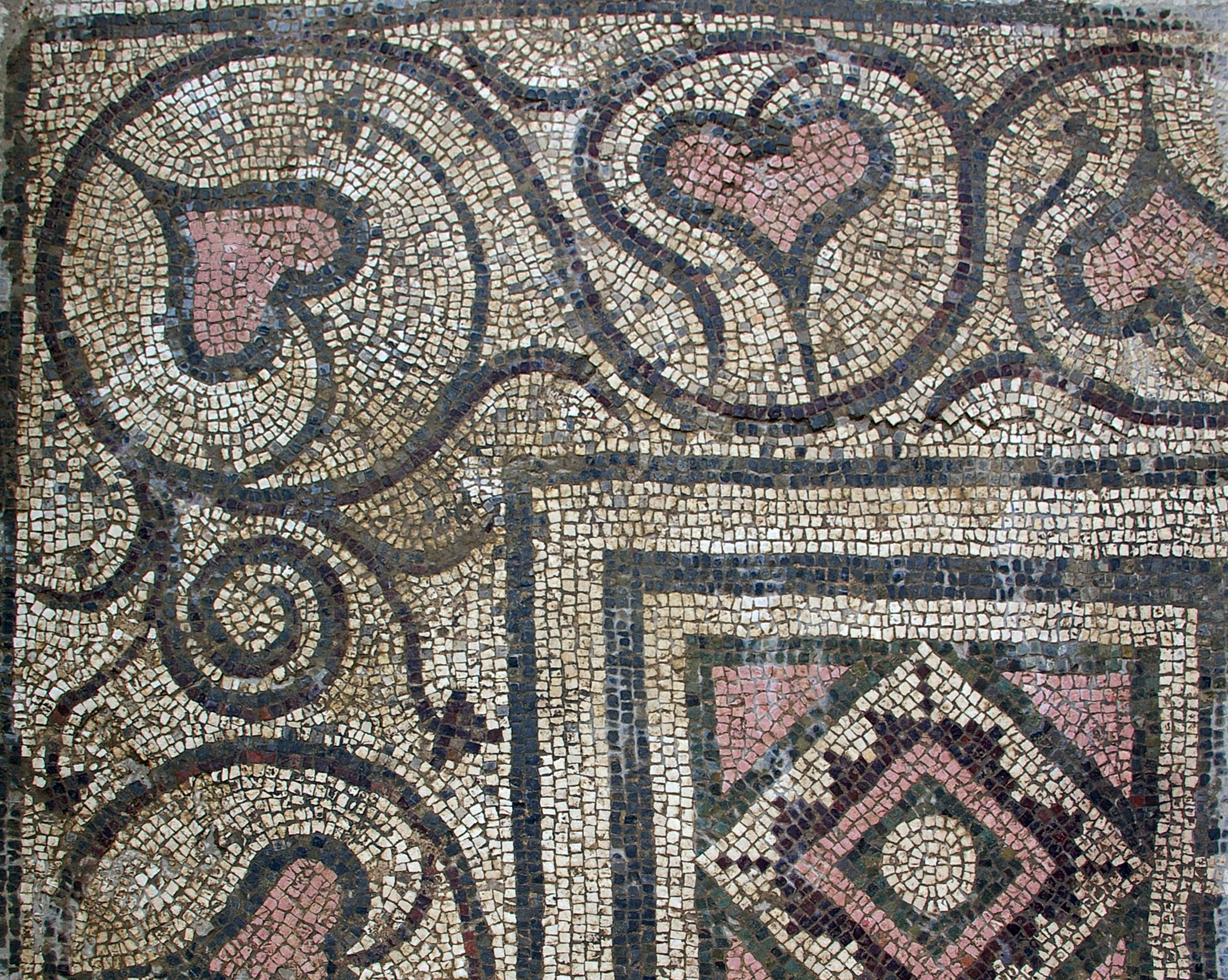
mosaic of the large room of the baths

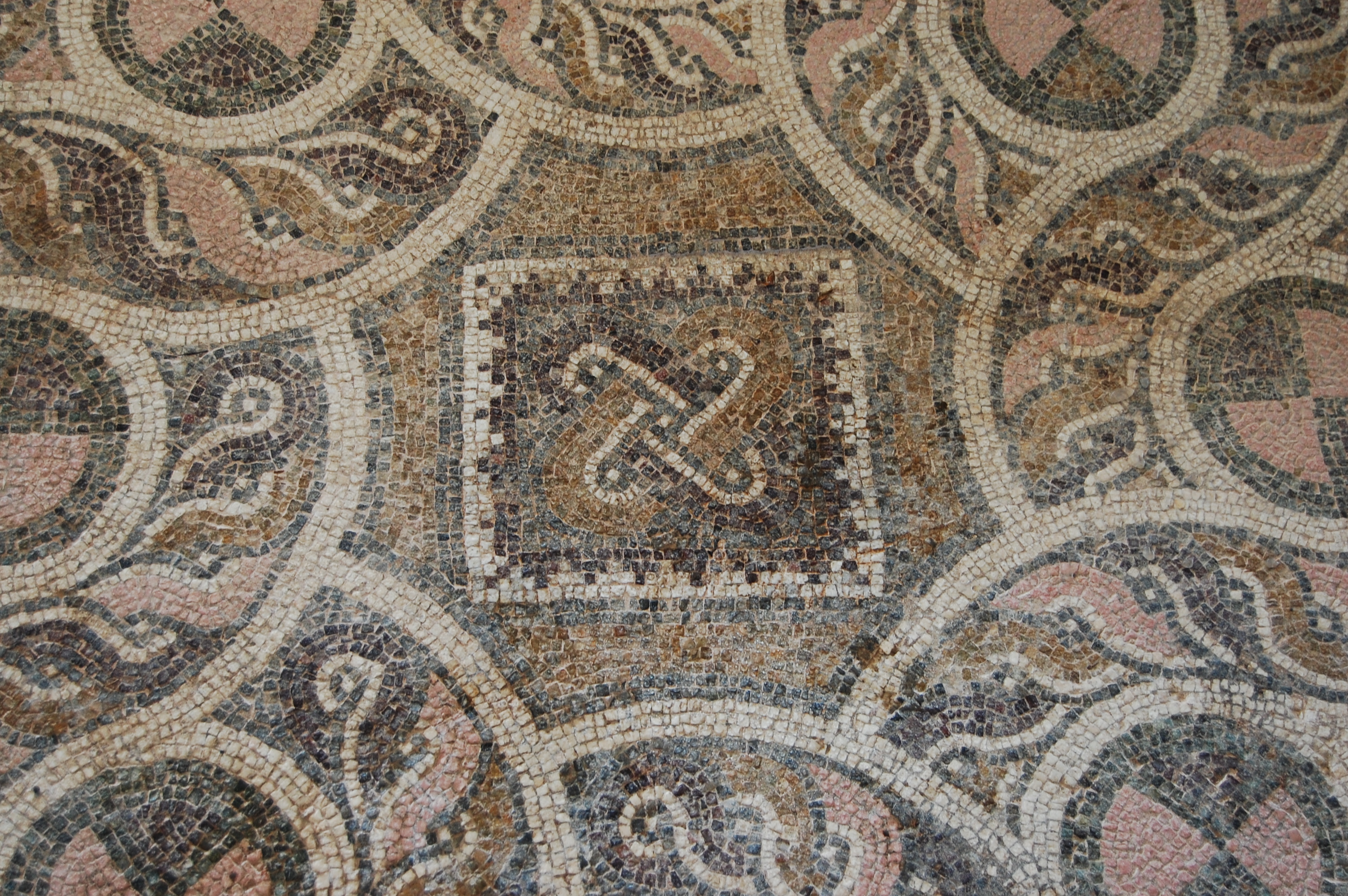
mosaic of the large room of the baths

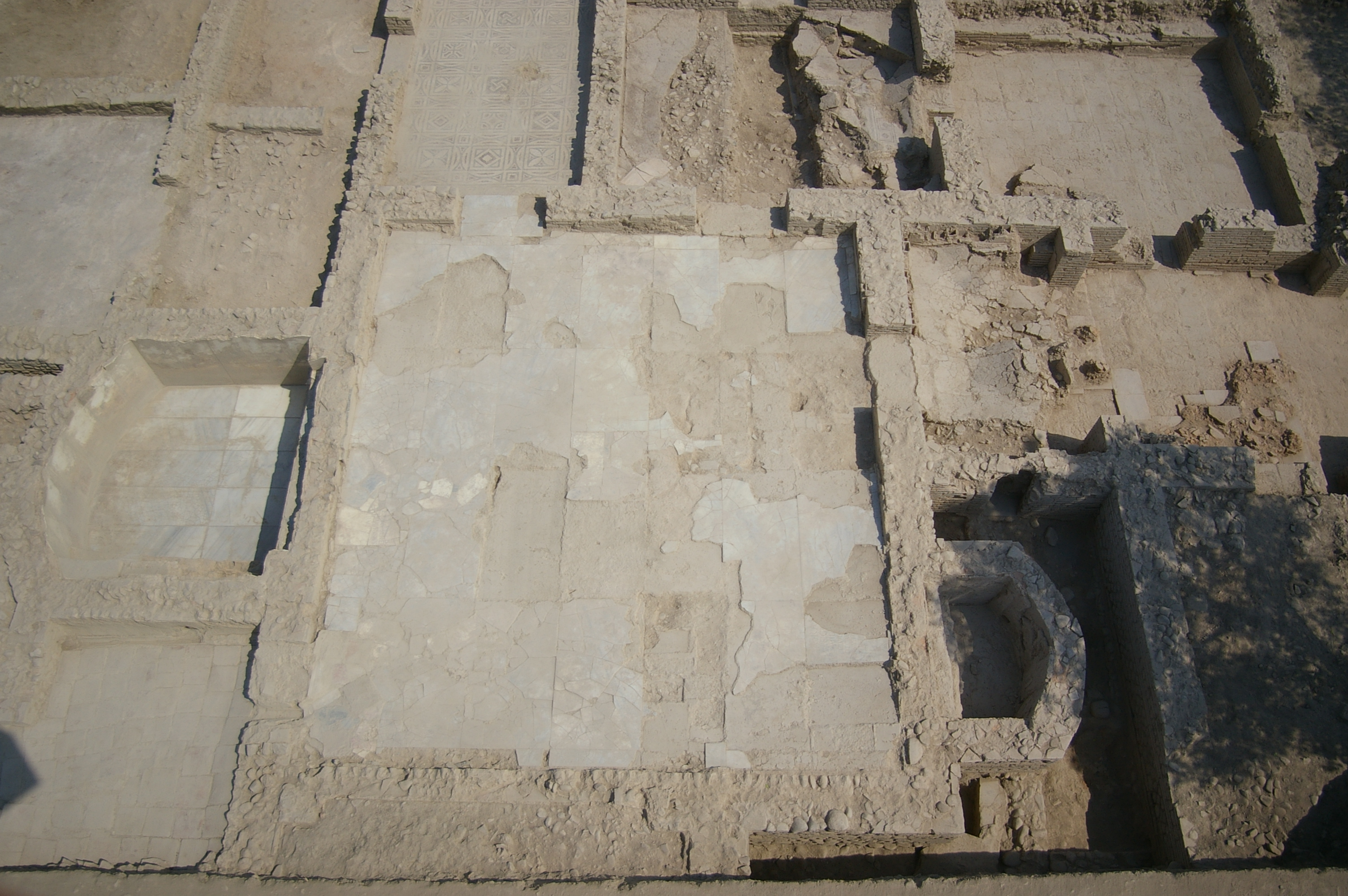
frigidarium

=== The cenatio ===
The large summer dining room (cenatio) of 128 m^{2} with its rich wall and floor decorations, was aimed at exalting the banquet as an important event and "showing off" the lifestyle of late antique aristocracy. The elite were obliged to entertain guests and display their social status through the standard of their homes with their architectural grandeur, in order to meet friends but more importantly to create political ties and exhibit social status. A dominus would often invite his clients who in return gave him political support.

The cenatio was surrounded by a monumental portico (room 2) and was designed as one of the main foci of the villa, closely connected to the baths via a corridor which used an arm of the peristyle of the previous villa (room 26). The importance of baths and dining rooms in aristocratic and late antique urban and rural villas is well known, as in the imperial villa in Maiorano di Viggiano (Basilicata).

In its first phase at the beginning of the 5th century, the cenatio had a mosaic floor similar to that of the adjacent baths. Around the middle of the century the impressive stibadium, the raised masonry semicircular area for up to 7 diners to recline on, was created and the floor remodelled.

The stibadium is the most impressive part of this room, complemented by a fountain with running water and decorated with opus sectile facing and reliefs depicting dancing maenads in gold leaf in the act of offering a drink to a snake wrapped around a xystus placed on an altar, clear allusion to mysterical cults, Bacchic in particular. The choice of these pagan subjects in a prominent position in a renovation of the 5th century when pagan religion was officially banned is indicative of a cultured aristocrat, aware of classical traditions. Also the discovery nearby of three conical glass lamps engraved with dulcis anima pie zeses ("Sweet mind, drink, may you live") and with the Christian cross. The inscription, frequently present in Gold glass in combination with subjects of pagan and Christian inspiration, refers to the greeting used during banquets, adapted to the function of the containers as gifts, and refers to a cultured aristocratic context.

The small size of this type of stibadium is linked to a highly selective banquet, with a few guests allowed to lie next to the owner (dominus), regulated by hierarchical conventions, as in the description by Sidonius Apollinaris (430–481/490). The banquet itself was a show with musicians, actors, mimes, dancers, but also for the self-representation, typical of the late antique aristocratic class, in a space in which everyone, dominus and guests, respected precise social conventions and played a part, replicating the model of the imperial court. The positions of the two quadrangular carpets, with mirrors in giallo antico and pavonazzo framed by serpentine, on the sides of the stibadium underline access to the most important part of the room.

The dining room had direct visual contact with the surrounding landscape through large openings on the long sides with the use of columns or pillars, highlighting a desire make it a sort of luxurious gazebo for banquets in the countryside. The play of natural light (particularly at sunset, when the setting sun flooded the stibadium with light) and of artificial light as demonstrated by the discovery of glass lamps, must have been effective.

The central part of the dining room is a wide and shallow pool, using a scenographic effect with water that flowed from the stibadium filled by a complex system. The studied placement of the opus sectile panels in glass and marbles such as porphyry, characteristic of imperial buildings and the homes of very high-ranking figures, and inserted as emblems on the central axis of the room, is linked to the view of the diners arranged on the semicircular bed. These panels are extremely rare and found only in particularly luxurious buildings.

The running water not only refreshed the environment on hot summer days, but also emphasized the colours of the opus sectile panels and marble slabs, making the space very scenic. The water then flowed out across the portico, creating a sort of 'stream', and into a well. The use of water in such prestigious banquet buildings is known in Claudius' triclinium-nymphaeum of Punta Epitaffio in Baiae and the villa del Casale of Piazza Armerina.

There are three entrances, a central "official" one with a large brick arch, for use by the owner and his guests, and two side ones, minor and service, probably used by the attendants.

The floor made up of mainly reused marble slabs (perhaps recovered from the abandoned rooms of the previous villa), is organised in such a way as to suggest the specialisation of the spaces of the cenatio, with greater regularity in the central portion and a significant absence of decoration next to the entrance, where white marble slabs seem linked to a space intended for games and shows and clearly visible by the guests.

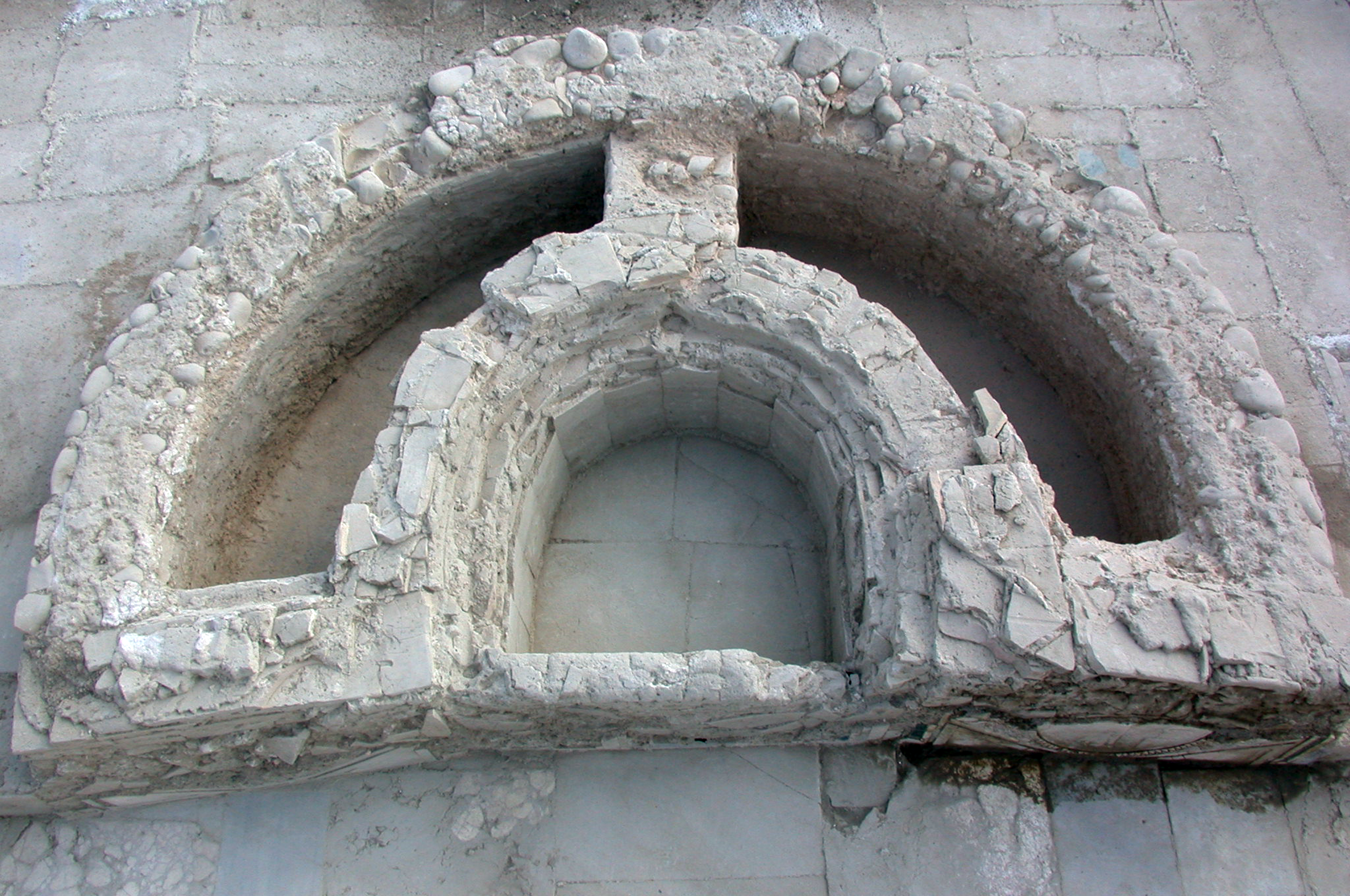
Stibadium with the water basin in the centre

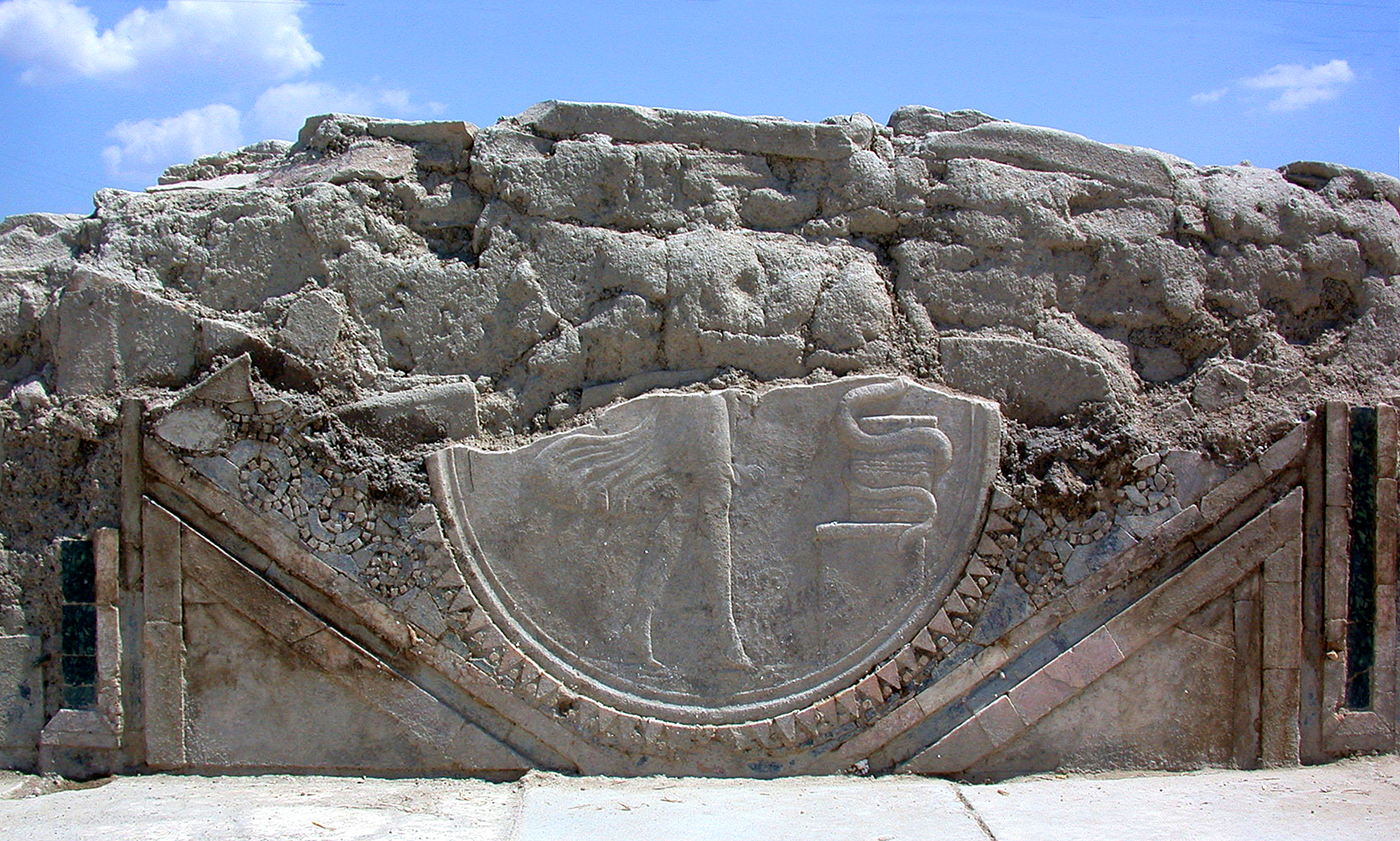
front right side of the stibadium with a reused 1st AD oscillum

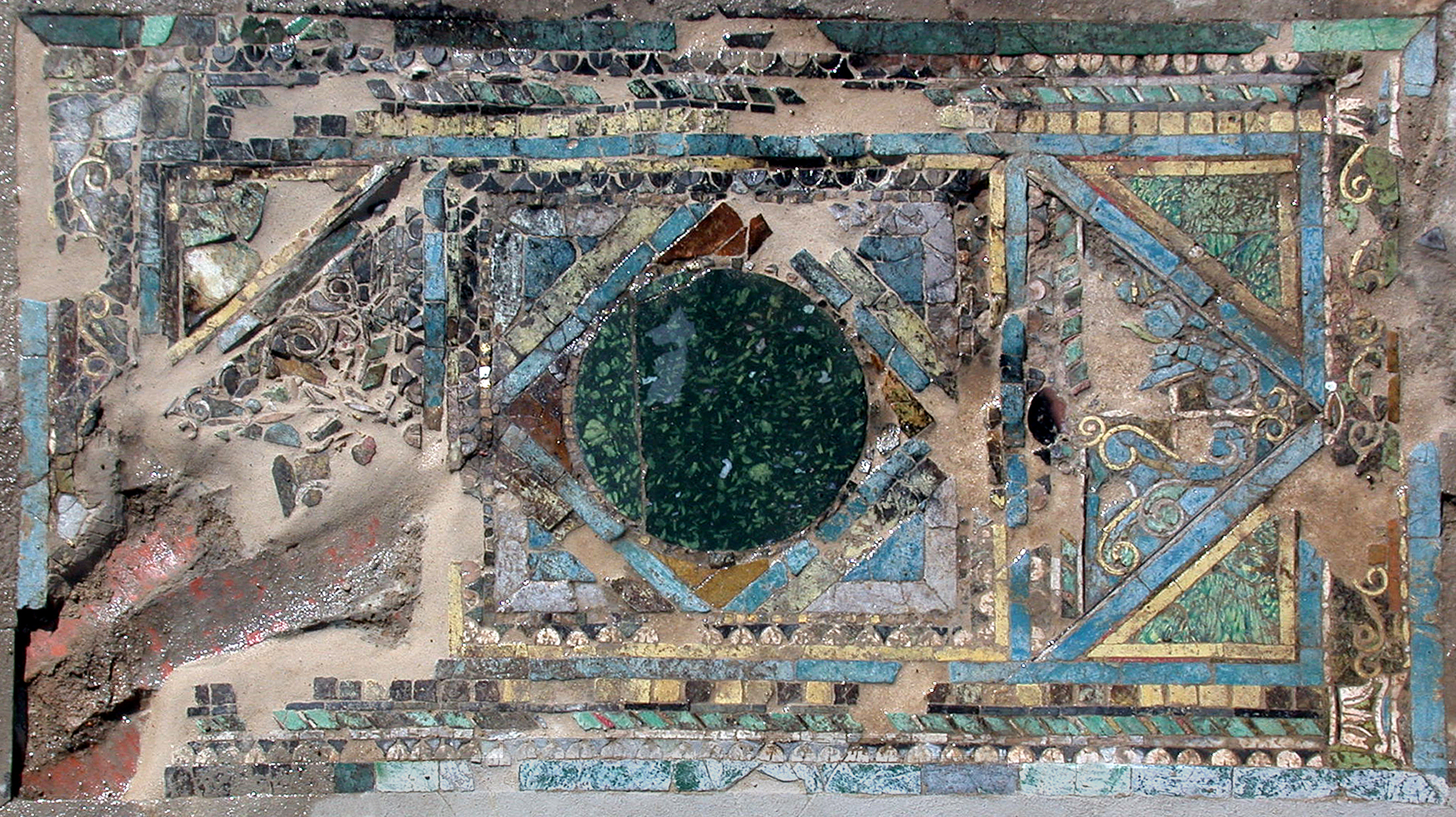
One of the opus sectile panels in the pavement of the cenatio

== Other rooms ==
To the south of the cenatio were rooms used as warehouses and pantries, as well as a latrine. Other rooms on the upper floor could be reached via a staircase of which there are conspicuous remains.

To the north of the cenatio, another block of rooms was found, with various service spaces on the ground floor (kitchens, warehouses) and probably residences on the first floor, according to a building model typical of the late antiquity era.

A few tens of metres from the cenatio stood a large building, which could be a horreum, a large grain warehouse.
