= Triclinium =

Roman dining room

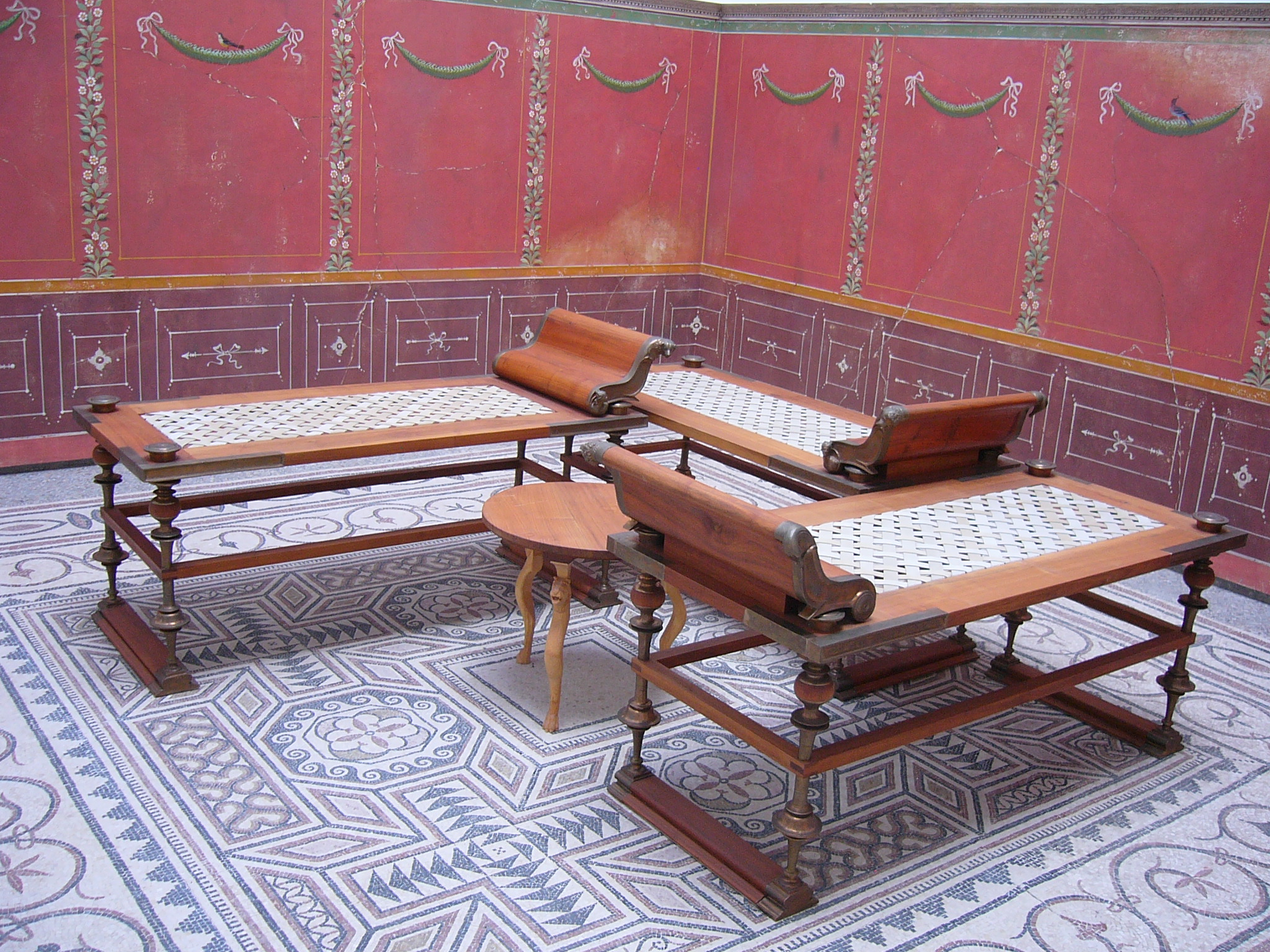
Reproduction of a triclinium

A triclinium (pl.: triclinia) is a formal dining room in a Roman building. The word is adopted from the Greek triklinion (τρικλίνιον)—from tri- (τρι-), "three", and klinē (κλίνη), a sort of couch, or rather chaise longue. Each couch was sized to accommodate a diner who reclined on their left side on cushions while some household slaves served multiple courses brought from the culina, or kitchen, and others entertained guests with music, song, or dance.

The triclinium was characterized by three lecti (singular lectus: bed or couch), called triclinares ("of the triclinium"), on three sides of a low square table, whose surfaces sloped away from the table at about 10 degrees. Diners would recline on these surfaces in a semi-recumbent position. The fourth side of the table was left free, presumably to allow service to the table. Usually, the open side faced the entrance of the room. In Roman-era dwellings, particularly wealthy ones, triclinia were common and the hosts and guests would recline on pillows while feasting.

The Museum of Archeology in Arezzo, Italy and the House of Cairo in Pompeii offer what are thought to be accurate reconstructions of triclinia. The custom of using klinai ("dining couches") while taking a meal rather than sitting became popular among the Greeks in the early seventh century BC. From there, it spread to its colonies in southern Italy (Magna Graecia) and was eventually adopted by the Etruscans.

In contrast to the Greek tradition of allowing only male guests into the formal dining room, called andrōn, while everyday meals were taken with the rest of the family in the oikos, the Etruscans seem not to have restricted the use of the klinē to the male sex. The Romans may have seen the first dining klinai used by the Etruscans but may have refined the practice when they later came to closer contact with the Greek culture.

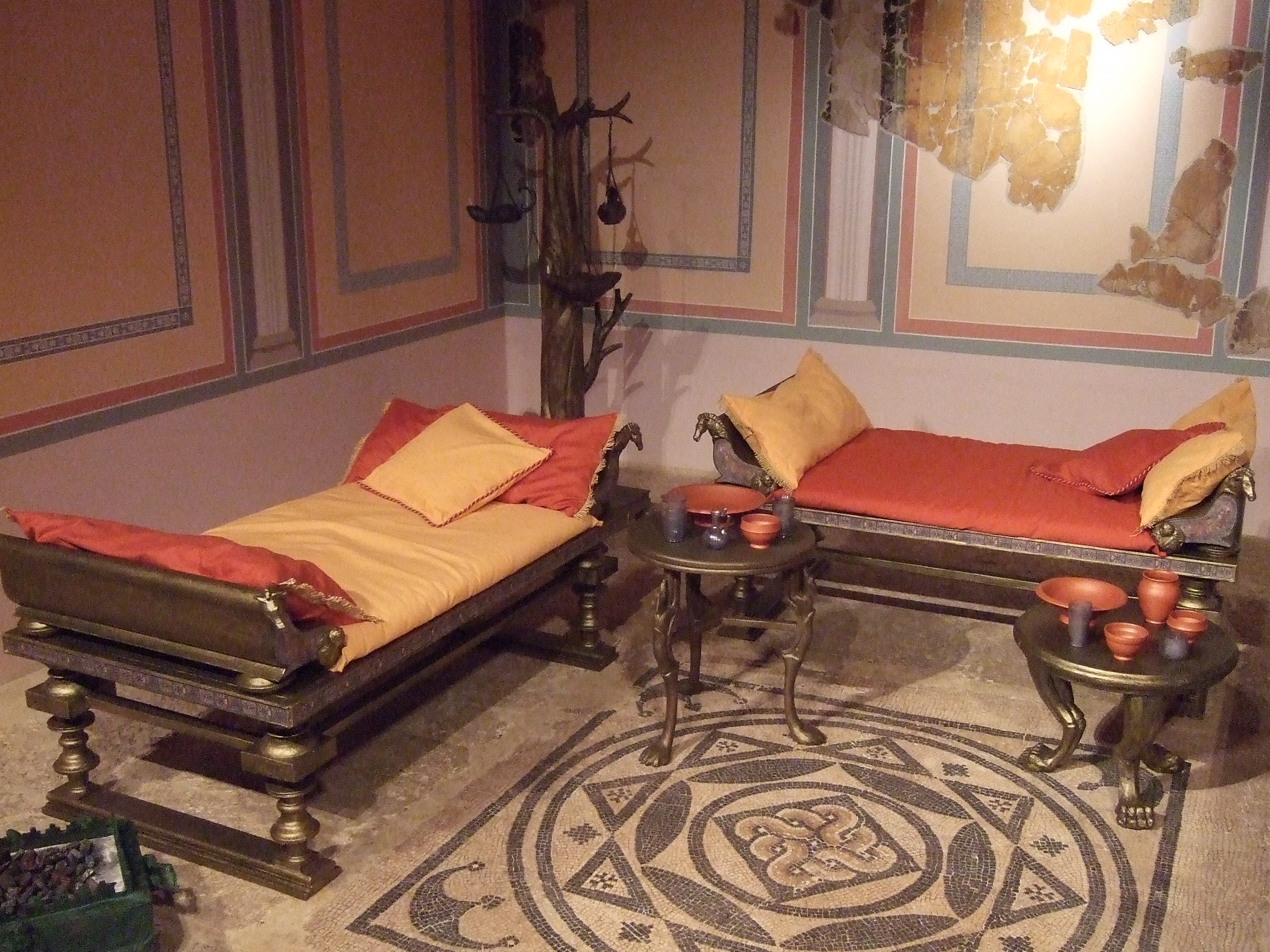
A reproduction of a biclinium

Dining was the defining ritual in Roman domestic life, lasting from late afternoon through late at night. Typically, nine to twenty guests were invited, arranged in a prescribed seating order to emphasize divisions in status and relative closeness to the dominus. As static, privileged space, dining rooms received extremely elaborate decoration, with complex perspective scenes and central paintings (or, here, mosaics). Dionysus, Venus, and still lifes of food were popular. Middle-class and elite Roman houses usually had at least two triclinia; it is not unusual to find four or more. Here, the triclinium maius ("big dining room") would be used for larger dinner parties, which would typically include many clients of the owner.

Smaller triclinia would be used for smaller dinner parties, with a more exclusive set of guests. Hence, their decoration was often at least as elaborate as that found in larger triclinia. As in the larger triclinia, wine, food, and love were always popular themes. However, because of their association with patronage and because dining entertainment often included recitation of highbrow literature like epics, dining rooms could also feature more "serious" themes. As in many houses in Pompeii, here the smaller dining room (triclinium minus) forms a suite with the adjoining cubiculum and bath.

In later republican times, after the introduction of round tables of citrus wood, the three couches were replaced by one of crescent shape (called sigma from the form of the Greek letter), which as a rule was only intended to hold five persons. The two corner seats (cornua) were the places of honor, that on the right being considered superior. The remaining seats were reckoned from left to right so that the least important seat was on the left side of the most important. The use of the sigma continued until the Middle Ages.

== See also ==
- Accubitum
- Cyzicene hall
- Domus
- Stibadium
- Klinē
