= Cyzicene hall =

A Cyzicene hall is the architectural term derived from the Latin word cyzicenus given by Vitruvius to the large hall used by the Greeks that faced north, with a prospect towards the gardens; the windows of this hall opened down to the ground, so that the green verdure could be seen by those lying on the couches. A Cyzicene hall is similar to the Roman triclinium, although much larger.

Latin Cyzincenus is a borrowing of Koinē Greek: Κυζικηνός, meaning "of the city of Cyzicus".
