= Klinē =

Ancient Greek furniture

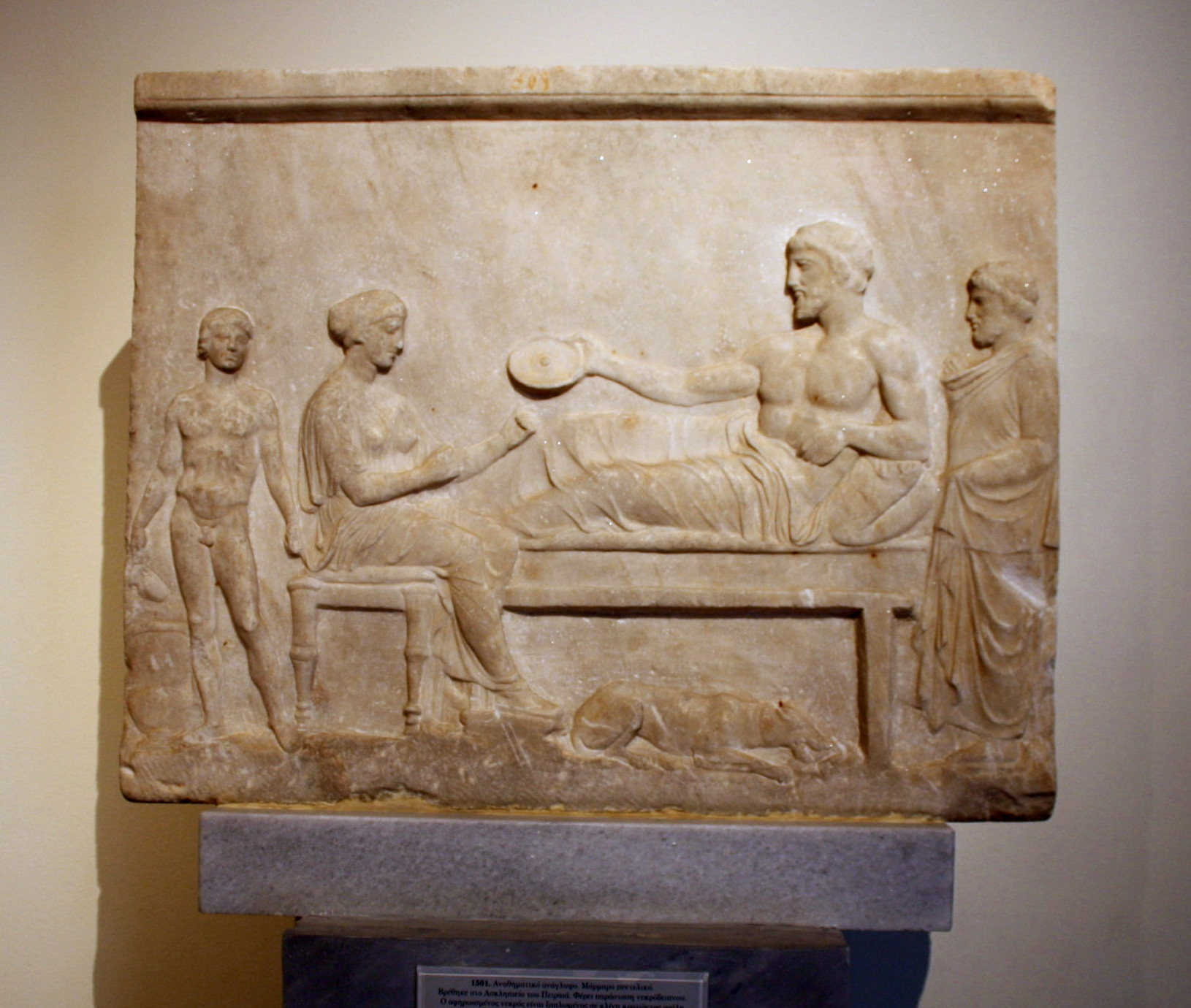
Votive relief showing a funerary banquet, 5th century BC. The dead man is shown as a heroized man lying on a klinē. On display in Room 19–20 of the National Archaeological Museum, Athens.

Klinai (Greek; sing.: κλίνη klinē), known in Latin as lectus triclinaris, were a type of ancient furniture used by the ancient Greeks in their symposia and by the ancient Romans in their somewhat different convivia.

In the later part of the Hellenistic period, an arrangement of three klinai positioned in a 'U' shape developed, which together formed the triclinium. Each kline of a triclinium offered room for three diners. The seating arrangement of the reclining dinner guests was given a strict significance.

A two-klinai arrangement created a biclinium, with the two couches either at a right angle or facing each other. Biclinium (pl.: biclinia) may also mean a dining couch for two persons in ancient Rome.
